= Landesstraße =

Type of roads in Germany and Austria

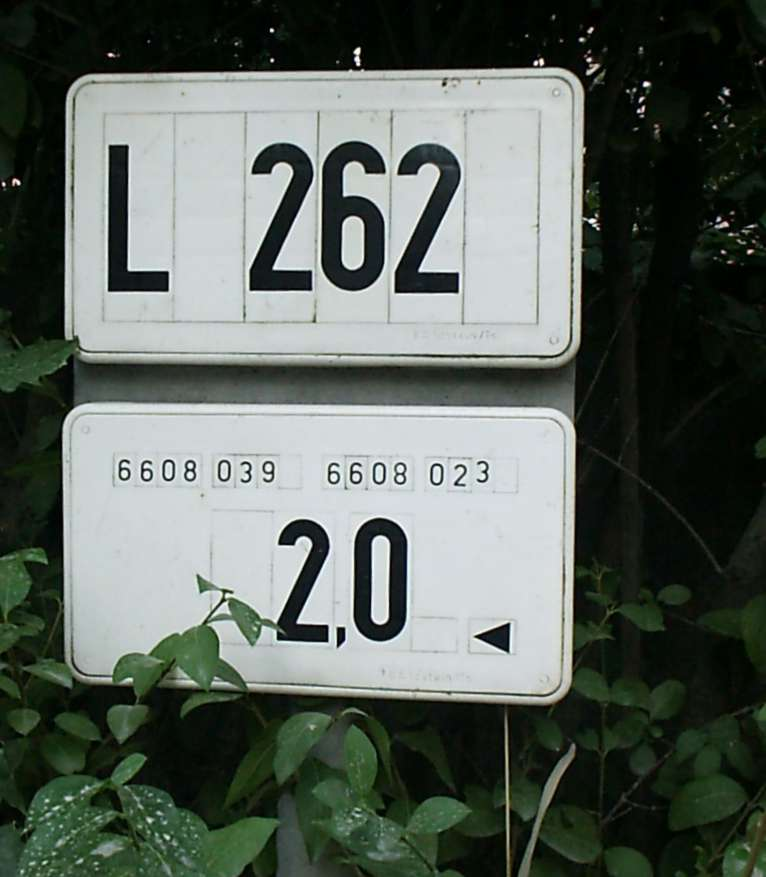
Road and distance sign at kilometre 2.0 on the L 262 in Landsweiler-Reden (Saar) (Category 2 Landesstraßen here equate to Kreisstraßen in other states)

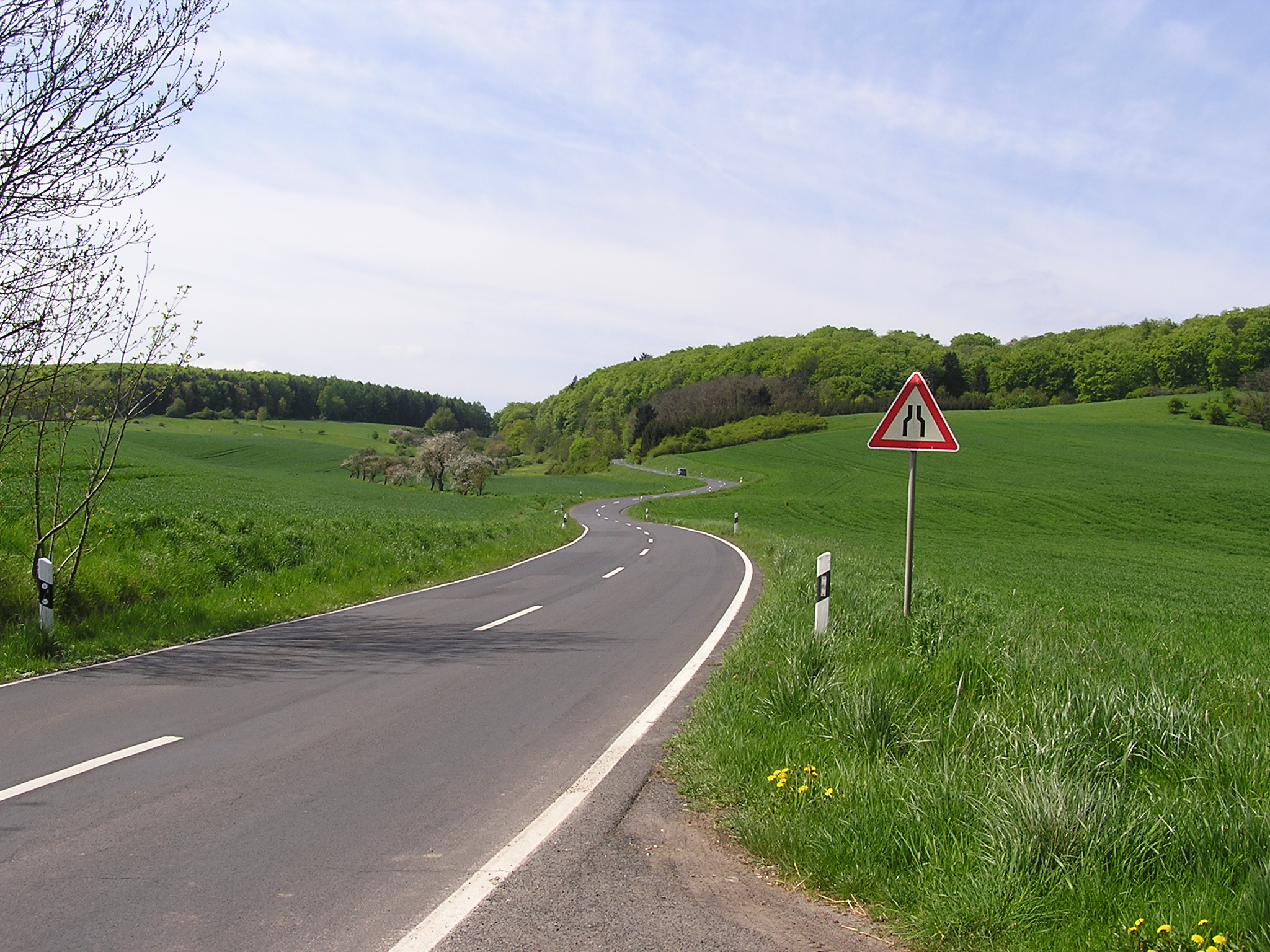
The L 3190 near Stockheim; typical construction

Landesstraßen (singular: Landesstraße [ˈlandəsˌʃtʁaːsə]) are roads in Germany and Austria that are, as a rule, the responsibility of the respective German or Austrian states. The term may therefore be translated as "state road". They are roads that cross the boundary of a rural or urban district (Landkreis or Kreisfreie Stadt). A Landesstraße is thus less important than a Bundesstraße or federal road, but more significant than a Kreisstraße or district road. The classification of a road as a Landesstraße is a legal matter (Widmung). In the free states of Bavaria and Saxony – but not, however, in the Free State of Thuringia – Landesstraßen are known as Staatsstraßen.

== Designation ==
The abbreviation for a Landesstraße consists of a prefixed capital letter L and a serial number (e. g. L 1, L 83, L 262 or L 3190). Staatsstraßen in Saxony are similarly abbreviated using a capital S (e. g. S 190) and the Staatsstraßen in Bavaria are prefixed with the letters St (e. g. St 2108).

The kilometrage is shown on white signs by the roadside with black letters, known as location signs (Stationszeichen), that replace the former kilometre stones. The beginning and end of a Landesstraße is specified using so-called hub (Netzknoten) numbers. That makes its location unambiguous, which is important for rapid assistance when there is an accident, for example. The hub numbers are displayed on the upper part of the sign and also indicate their direction. In the example in the photograph, therefore No. 6608 039 is left of the sign 6608 023 to the right. In the bottom right-hand corner of the sign can be seen the so-called Stationierungsrichtung or direction of signage. It runs in the example from right to left and indicates in which direction the road kilometres are counted.

In Lower Saxony, this new system has been in place since 2007 and divides the Landestraßen into sections numbered 10, 20, etc. The location signs (Stationszeichen) comprise two panels. The location panel (Stationierungstafel) displays the name of the state (Niedersachsen) and county letters (e.g. Kreis WF) at the top, and the road letter and number below (e.g. L 627). The classification panel (Klassifizierungstafel) shows the section number, kilometrage and direction of the start hub (e.g. 10 Abschnitt and 2,0 → 0,0). The letters OD indicate a location post within a town or village and may be displayed in places other than on a white post. By the end of 2008, almost all the 8,000 kilometre posts on Lower Saxony's Landesstraßen had been replaced.

== Properties ==
In terms of their construction, Landesstraßen tend to be built to a lesser standard than Bundesstraßen and their cross-section is generally smaller. In individual cases, however, the standard of construction may vary depending on when it was built and its importance as a route. However, Landesstraßen can be built as limited-access dual carriageways in densely populated areas.

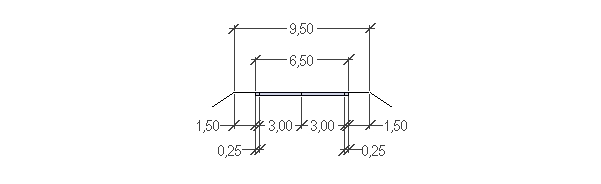
Standard cross-section 9.5 with a road width of 6.5 m. Typical standard cross-section with a permitted maximum loading of 15,000 vehs/day (of which 300 lorries/day).

Due to the division of funding, the states usually try to get the more substantial Landesstraßen officially designated as Bundesstraßen, so that their subsequent improvement and maintenance is funded from the federal budget. The Bundesstraßen are, however, intended as links between cities (major centres) and radiate from them. It is not usually possible to have concentric roads, which link the satellite towns with one another, designated as Bundesstraßen. Similarly, it is difficult to transfer responsibility for the short stub roads running from cities to nearby motorways to the Federal Authorities.

== Situation in the new states of Germany ==
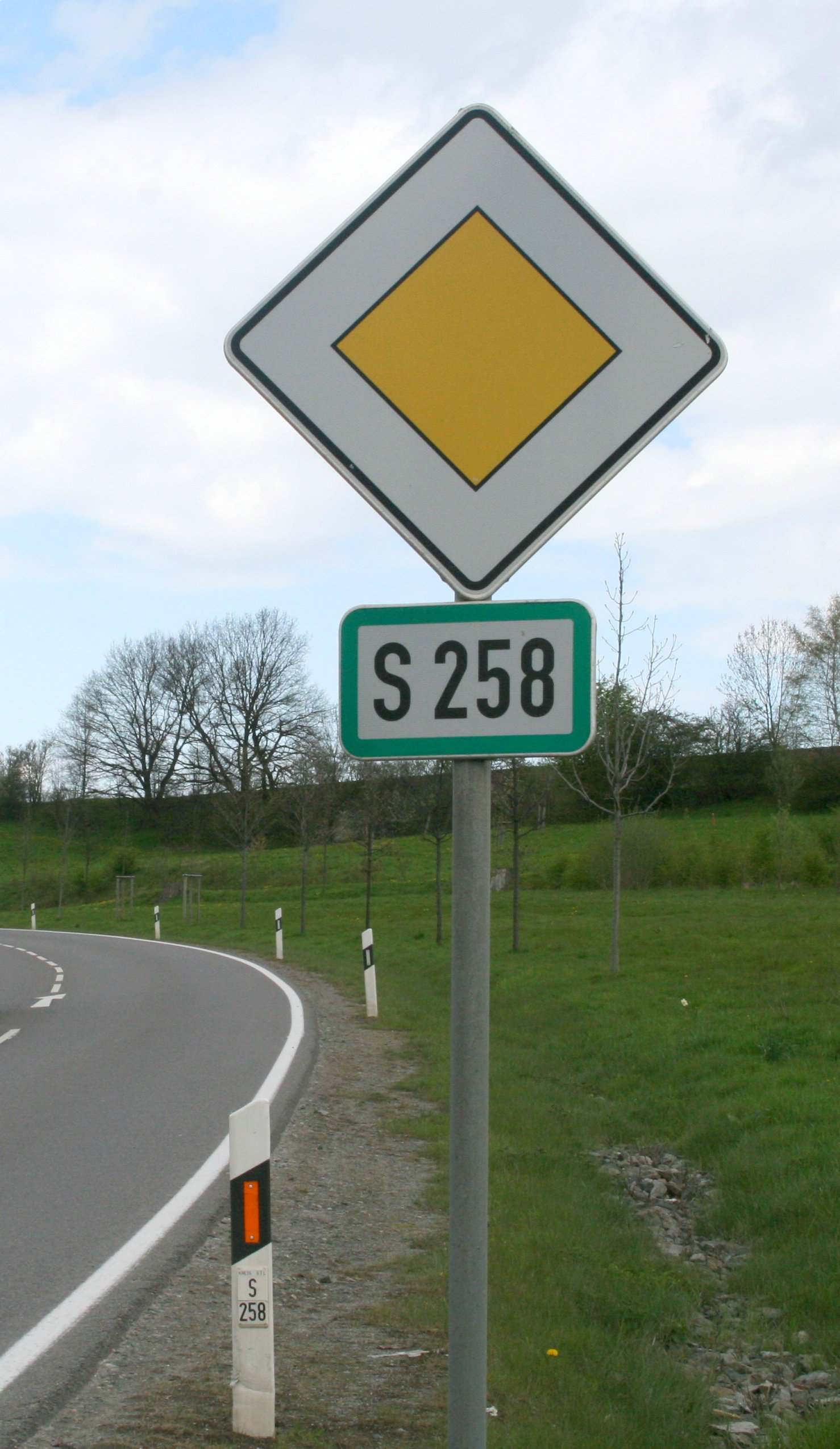
State road S258 in Saxony after reconstruction.

Following German reunification the Bezirksstraßen of the GDR (also called Category 1 Landstraßen) were generally classified as Landesstraßen without consideration for their condition. This leads to a wide range of road types falling within this category. On the one hand, there are inter-city roads which have been modernised to a good quality standard. On the other hand, due to the austere design of the country road network in the GDR (e. g. occasionally one of two parallel roads or, where they were of low traffic importance, the links between them were simply allowed to fall into disrepair) there are today in the new states of Germany several unpaved roads and dirt tracks that are formally Landesstraßen (e. g. the L 208 between Burkersroda and Balgstädt in Saxony-Anhalt or the L 1062 between Wittersroda and Lengefeld in Thuringia). The upgrade of these roads is unlikely in view of the lack of funding and their low importance; in most cases attempts are being made to have their status downgraded.

== Situation in Austria ==
Traffic sign for Landesstraße B

Traffic sign for Landesstraße L

In Austria today all important roads, apart from autobahns and Schnellstraßen (limited-access roads) managed by the publicly owned ASFiNAG corporation, are called Landesstraßen. Since 2002, even the former Bundesstraßen national highways are Landesstraßen, because they were placed under the responsibility of the federal states.

Before 2002 there were two types of Bundesstraße:

- A white number on a blue square sign identified the more common type that are at the same time priority roads (Vorrangstraße). Their vehicle users had the right of way already by the blue sign.
- A black number (typically greater than 100) on a yellow circular sign marks state roads that are not per se priority roads.

Except in Vorarlberg, the former Bundesstraßen continue to be designated with the prefix B. The remaining Landesstraßen are prefixed with the letter L. On traffic signs the prefixes are usually not used, unlike the A (for Autobahn) and S (Schnellstraße). Roads numbered with fewer digits are generally of more importance in the road network. The former designation of more important Landesstraßen in several states as Landeshauptstraßen (LH, in Vienna: Hauptstraßen A) is only occasionally seen now on road and street maps.

== See also ==
- Autobahn
- Bundesstraße
- Gemeindestraße
- Kreisstraße
