= Karsdorf remains =

Neolithic human remains found in Germany

The location of Karsdorf municipality in Saxony-Anhalt, Germany.

Individual remains	I0795 KAR6	I0797 KAR16a
ID	I0795 KAR6 Feature 170 Musm.no. 2006:14423a	I0797 KAR16a Feature 611 Musm.no. 2004:26374a
Y DNA	T-BY91852	T-BY91852
Population	Early EN	Early EN
Language	Paleo-European	Paleo-European
Culture	LBK	LBK
Date (YBP)	7076 ± 90	7087 ± 725
House / Location	S / Karsdorf	H / Karsdorf
Members / Sample Size	1/2	1/2
Percentage	50%	50%
mtDNA	H1* or H1au1b	H46b
Isotope Sr	Native to Unstruttal	Native to Unstruttal
Eye color	Likely gray or blue eyes	Likely gray or blue eyes
Hair color	Likely non-dark hair	Likely non-red hair
Skin pigmentation		Rs1042602 (C;C)
ABO Blood Group	Likely O or B	Rs8176719 (T;T)
Diet (d13C%0 / d15N%0)	-20.0 / 9.0 (higher Animal Protein)	-20.2 / 9.1 (higher Animal Protein)
FADS activity	rs174554 (A;A)	rs174574 (A;A)
Lactase Persistence		Likely lactose-intolerant
Oase-1 Shared DNA	34.06%	18.06%
Ostuni1 Shared DNA	12.49%	2.43%
Neanderthal Vi33.26 Shared DNA	3.81%	1.08%
Neanderthal Vi33.25 Shared DNA	2.13%	1.79%
Neanderthal Vi33.16 Shared DNA	1.71%	0%
Ancestral Component (AC)	Neolithic Anatolia/Southeast Europe: 70.56%, Caucasus Hunter / Early European Farmer: 19.86%, Scandinavian / West European Hunter: 9.34%, Paleolithic Levant (Natufians): 0.24%	Neolithic Anatolia/Southeast Europe: 56.23%, Paleolithic Levant (Natufians): 16.56%, Caucasus Hunter / Early European Farmer: 14.19%, Scandinavian / West European Hunter: 9.64%, Neolithic Iran: 2.54%
puntDNAL K12 Ancient	59% Anatolia Neolithic Farmer + 24% Caucasus Hunter-Gatherer + 10% European Hunter-Gatherer + 7% Near Eastern	60% Anatolia Neolithic Farmer + 27% European Hunter-Gatherer + 9% Near Eastern + 2% Caucasus Hunter-Gatherer + 2% Sub-Saharan
Dodecad [dv3]	69.1% Mediterranean + 21% West European + 10% Southwest Asian	64.2% Mediterranean + 17.4% West European + 10.5% Southwest Asian + 4.2% West Asian + 3.7% Northwest African
Eurogenes [K=36]	56.9% Italian + 31.9% West Mediterranean + 6.3% Iberian + 2.1% Basque + 1.3% North African + 0.9 East Balkan + 0.3% East Mediterranean + 0.3% Arabian	37.1% Italian + 21% West Mediterranean + 16.9% Iberian + 11.8 East Balkan + 7.7% Armenian + 5.5% East Mediterranean + 0.05% North African
Dodecad [Globe13]	67.4% Mediterranean + 16.5% Southwest Asian + 16% North European	61% Mediterranean + 19.7% Southwest Asian + 19.2% North European
Genetic Distance	98.6cM in chr 8	98.6cM in chr 8
Parental Consanguinity	MRCA = 1.1 generations	MRCA = 1.1 generations
Age at Death	45-60	24-26
Death Position	Flexed Left	Stretched Dorsal
SNPs	107.480	95.833
Read Pairs	5.279.657	7.128.606
Sample	Tooth / Rib	Tooth / Rib
Source		
Notes	Goseck circle	Goseck circle

The Karsdorf remains are the bodies of more than 30 Neolithic humans who were buried in the vicinity of Karsdorf, Sachsen-Anhalt, Germany.

Two males, known as KAR6 (or I0795) and KAR16a (I0797), have been of great interest to scholars as the subject of successful Y-DNA analysis. Both have been found to belong to subclades of Y-DNA Haplogroup T1a1, which is rare in modern populations. These ancient specimens' mtDNA haplogroups have been found to be H1* (H1au1b) and H46b. Their autosomal ancestral components also consist of around 70% Western European Hunter-Gatherer (WHG) and 30% Basal Eurasian. Both men lived 7500–6800 BP and belonged to the Linienbandkeramische Kultur ("Linear band pottery culture"; LBK).

== Site ==
The spread of different groups without close social or biological kinship

Building on both the evidence previously available for the LBK and the evidence presented here, we suggest that the repeated occurrence of almost indiscriminate massacres, the possible abduction of selected members, and the patterns of torture, mutilation, and careless disposal all fit into the concept of prehistoric warfare as currently understood within anthropology. Particular LBK groups were singled out for as yet unknown reasons, attacked with brute force, and annihilated by others, probably close neighbors and very likely other LBK groups of the wider region. As has been shown, even within the overall quite homogenous-appearing LBK, recognizable boundaries did exist in many places. These borders most probably were a result of the spread of different groups without close social or biological kinship ties to one another who came into close contact as a consequence of the LBK colonization pattern. In fact, because the LBK was the first complete Neolithic culture in Central Europe, today all farmers of this time and region are classified as members of the LBK by default, regardless of how these people defined themselves and how they differentiated themselves from their contemporaries.

— (Meyer et al., 2015)
The source of the Early European Neolithic

The fact that our samples are from northwestern Anatolia should not be taken to imply that the Neolithic must have entered Europe from that direction.

— (Mathieson et al., 2015)
The individual known as KAR6 (I0795)

This individual belonged to haplogroup T1a (PF5604:7890461C→T, M70:21893881A→C). This is the first instance of this haplogroup in an ancient individual that we are aware of and strengthens the case for the early Neolithic origin of this lineage in modern Europeans, rather than a more recent introduction from the Near East where it is more abundant today.

— (Haak et al., 2015)

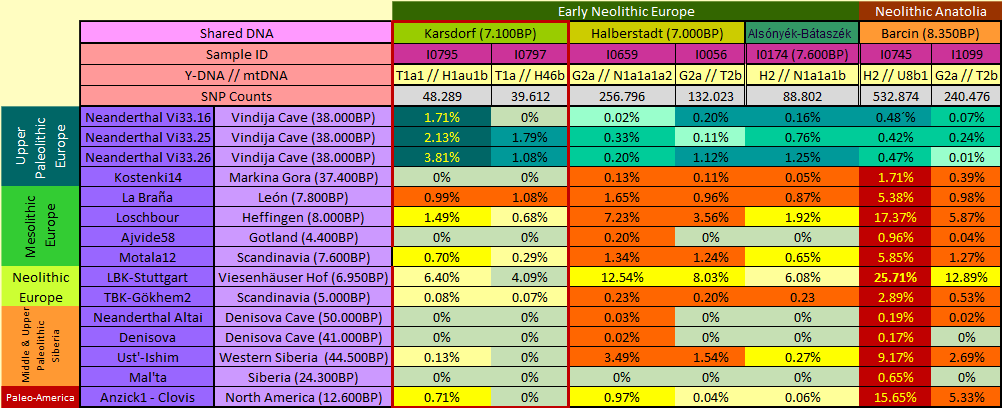
A comparison of Paleolithic European individuals, including the Karsdorf T1a1 individuals (column headed with lime green cell).

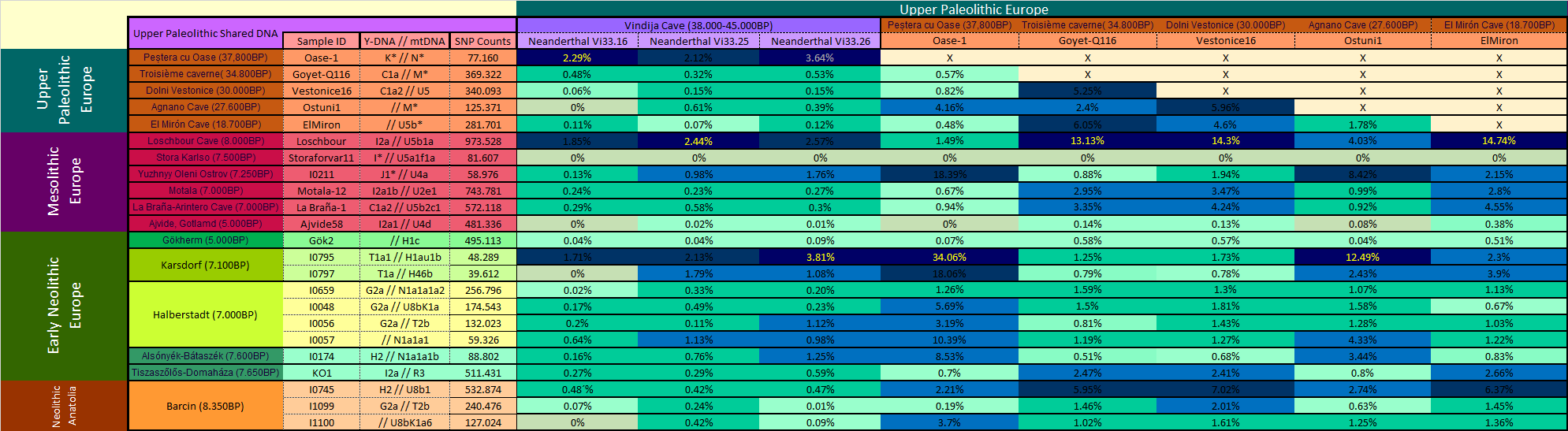
A comparison of Neanderthal DNA among Paleolithic European individuals, including the Karsdorf T1a1 individuals (row beginning with lime green cell).

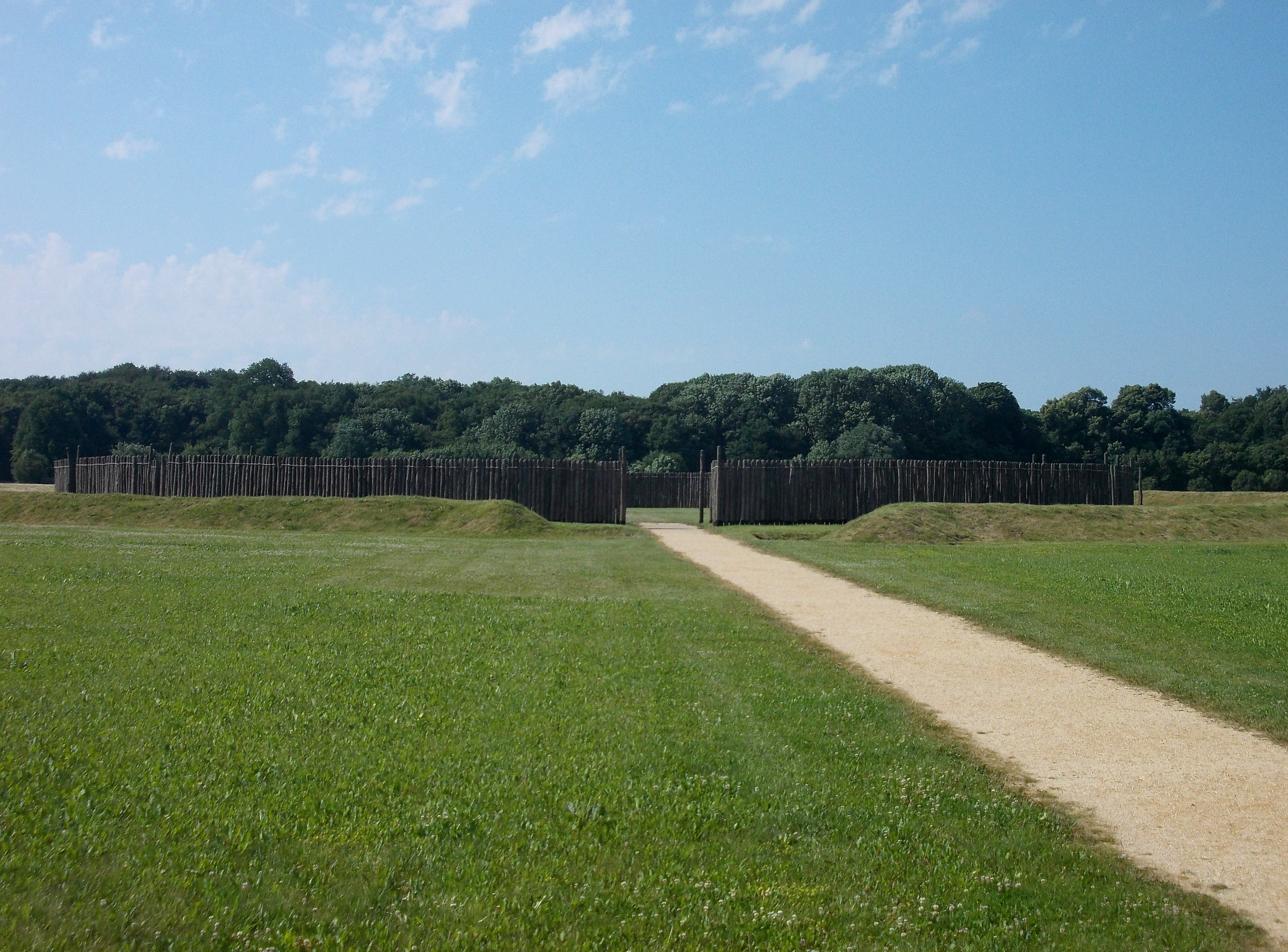
At a site near and similar to Karsdorf, is the 7000-year-old "Goseck circle", a pagan cult structure in Goseck, Burgenlandkreis, Saxony-Anhalt.

Located in the valley of Unstrut, Burgenlandkreis, Saxony-Anhalt, Germany, the Karsdorf sits is characterized by alluvial loess. The place itself was settled intensively since the earliest phase of the Linear Pottery culture (LBK) in the region. The settlement area is at least 50 acres in size and nearly 30 houses have been excavated. So-called ‘settlement burials’ were regularly found in pits in the center of the settlement area, of which individual KAR6/I0795 (feature 170, 5207-5070 calBCE, MAMS 22823) was sampled for this study.

The LBK settlement of Karsdorf (Burgenlandkreis, Saxony-Anhalt) is located approximately 100 km south of Derenburg and Halberstadt, on the river Unstrut, and was occupied between 5240 and 5000 BC (Behnke, 2007). The reasons why this early Neolithic settlement was abandoned are unclear. The Neolithic buildings (n=24) of three settlement stages are dated to the early and middle LBK (after Meier-Arendt 1966). Except for four graves, all of the 30 burials are associated in groups next to houses in the centre of the settlement, similar to the site of Halberstadt. The individuals are buried in house-flanking pit graves at the western side of the houses and mostly arranged in north-east or north-west orientation. Grave goods are sparse; few graves contained more than one pot or a shell or horn pendant. Associated with every house group we can identify a person with outstanding grave inventory, who may represent a founding generation.|Oelze et al.

== Burials ==
A special feature of the LBK site at Karsdorf is graves associated with particular houses, which can therefore be regarded as settlement burials.

Most of the individuals were buried in a flexed position, oriented to the north-east or north-west. Six individuals were inhumed in supine and four in prone position, of which only three showed a fully stretched body.

The LBK in Karsdorf is represented by 24 longhouses oriented north-west–south-east. The assemblage is composed of 20 adults (55% males and 35% females), one juvenile (15–18 years), four as infants of 7–14 years and six infants of 0–6 years. The maximum age at death of males ranged between 40 and 59 years and of females 40–49 years respectively. The oldest individual is a woman with 65–75 years. In association with the house S and H, women, men, and children were buried together, in some cases even in the same pit. The furnishing of the graves at Karsdorf can be regarded as rather sparse. Only 9 out of 34 burials contained grave goods, such as an axe in a man's grave and a shell buried with a woman, imply sex-specific grave furnishings.

The large variability and the sparse indications for maternal kinship suggest a dynamic and mobile group of which several members were buried elsewhere and/or which integrated individuals who originated from other communities. These integrated individuals could be mostly females due to the high indications for paternal kinship among the analysed individuals.

== Isotope analysis ==
According to Sr isotope ratios, there are two distinct groups of individuals in Karsdorf but none of both are specially 'exotic'. So, there is no indication of individuals who grew up in geologically distinct uplands or further north in central Germany.

The first group, composed of the majority of the males, could have grown up in households that cultivated plots on calcareous soils, very probably in the Unstrut valley in the near vicinity of the settlement. The second group, composed of most of the females, could have grown up in households that predominantly cultivated plots on loess, possibly beyond the landmarks of the Unstrut River or about 80m above the site on the Querfurt plateau 1–2 km away. Sex-specific tendencies, the combination of the Sr isotope data with the results of previous carbon and nitrogen isotope analyses, and the similarity of the Sr isotope data of the youngest child with the majority of the males may be evaluated as being in agreement with the predominance of patrilocal residential rules.

The Karsdorf population diet consisted of plant crops consumption quite similar to other LBK sites but ate slightly higher quantities of animal protein. Despite this, there is one female individual that could be classified as a vegan because her results show that she fell in the range of those of the domestic and wild fauna from Karsdorf, indicating she might have lived on the similar herbivore diet for unknown reasons.
The consumption of unfermented dairy products is unlikely as there is direct palaeogenetic evidence of lactose intolerance for the site Derenburg. Children in these LBK cultures may have been weaned around the age of three and apparently ate the similar diet as adults after weaning. The highest isotopic value for stable isotopes of nitrogen is found in the youngest Karsdorf individual likely due to breastfeeding effects. In the Karsdorf population the highest animal protein consumption signal is found in a 15–18 years old individual belonging to mtDNA H. In addition, the lowest Plant Crop consumption signal is found in the youngest Karsdorf individual and secondarily in two out of three 21–24 years old individuals belonging to mtDNA U5a and H.

== DNA analysis ==
The two males, KAR6 and KAR 16a, identified as Y-DNA Haplogroup T1 from Karsdorf constitutes 22.2% of all ancient samples between 7500 and 6800 BP in Germany. The remainder belong to other clades: 22.2% are unknown carriers from Derenburg, and the remaining 55.6% are G2a bearers from Halberstadt and Derenburg.

In 2015 a published study by Mathieson et al. test several individuals from two Neolithic sites in northwest Anatolia, previously found in LBK sites from Germany, was not present in Barcin nor Mentese Neolithic settlements. This fact together with the absence of the mtDNA lineages carried by both individuals from Karsdorf and the occurrence of G2a and the mtDNA lineages carried by all of these G2a individuals, could mean that the Early European Neolithic had a different migration pattern and, therefore, a different geographical origin.

The autosomal data of I0797 showed the lowest frequency of Anatolian Neolithic component and the highest frequency of an unknown ancient human population for any studied LBK individual. This reinforces the hypothesis of a possible different geographical origin for this tribe instead of the Greco-Anatolian origin of other human groups found in the LBK like G2a.

=== T1a1 in Karsdorf ===
The presence of Y-DNA haplogroup T in Karsdorf, and in particular T1a1, attracted some interest among scholars.

Individual KAR6 (I0795) showed higher autosomal admixture frequencies of surrounding populations like Hunter Gatherer Europeans I2a (West Hunter Gatherers) and Aegean-Anatolian Neolithics G2a and H2. However, I0795 have the highest frequency of shared DNA with Upper Paleolithic Neanderthals from Central Europe found in any Early Neolithic population. Further comparisons show that I0795 has similar frequencies like Oase-1 when compared with Vindija Neanderthals. When I0795 and I0797 are compared to Oase-1, they both share a very high percentage of DNA 34% and 18% respectively and I0795 12% with Ostuni1. This could mean that this T1a1 tribe from Karsdorf was closest to Upper Paleolithic Hunter-Gatherers than to Mesolithic haplogroups.
