= Balgstädt =

- Municipality
- Location of Balgstädt within Burgenlandkreis district
- Interactive map of Balgstädt
- Location within Germany Location within Saxony-Anhalt
- Coordinates: 51°12′22″N 11°44′2″E
- Country: Germany
- State: Saxony-Anhalt
- District: Burgenlandkreis
- Municipal assoc.: Unstruttal

Government
  - Mayor (2024–31): Christian Balke

Area
  - Total: 32.58 km^{2} (12.58 sq mi)
- Elevation: 109 m (358 ft)

Population (2025-12-31)
  - Total: 1,041
  - Density: 31.95/km^{2} (82.76/sq mi)
- Time zone: UTC+01:00 (CET)
  - Summer (DST): UTC+02:00 (CEST)
- Postal codes: 06632, 06636, 06647
- Dialling codes: 034462, 034464, 034465
- Vehicle registration: BLK
- Website: www.balgstaedt.de

Balgstädt (German pronunciation: [ˈbalkˌʃtɛt]) is a municipality in the Burgenlandkreis district, in Saxony-Anhalt, Germany. Since 2009 it has incorporated the former municipalities of Burkersroda, Größnitz and Hirschroda.

== Geography ==
Balgstädt is in the valley of the lower reaches of the Unstrut, eight kilometres before its mouth in the Saale, at the confluence of the Hasselbach. The municipality is part of the nature park Saale-Unstrut-Triasland, in whose centre it lies. It is also located on the western edge of the wine-growing region Saale-Unstrut. Neighboring municipality are Freyburg, Naumburg (Saale), Lanitz-Hassel-Tal, An der Poststraße, Bad Bibra and Laucha an der Unstrut.

Districts of the municipality are Balgstädt, Burkersroda, Dietrichsroda, Größnitz, Hirschroda and Städten.

== Attractions ==
=== Village church ===
The village church from 1739 includes a late Romanesque, transversely rectangular choir tower, which was probably still preserved from a previous building. In the rectangular nave are two-storey wooden galleries, in the northeast the former manor lodge. Opposite this there is a bust of Georg Rudolf von Hessler (1641-1687) with heraldic shields. The wooden pulpit altar dates from the time of the construction of the nave. The basket has a font cartridge between Corinthian pilasters with acanthus cheeks, the laterally larger than life carved figures show Moses and John the Baptist and date from the 17th century.

==== Castle ====
The cultural monuments of the community are listed in the local monument list.

== Economy and Infrastructure ==
In addition to the agricultural cooperative that emerged from the former LPG, a chimney and firing construction company, as well as a winery, there are still several independent tradesmen. Another economic factor that should not be underestimated is tourism.

=== Tourism ===
Balgstädt benefits mainly from its location and the attractions in its surroundings such as the monastery ruins Zscheiplitz on the slope on the opposite side of the river, the Neuenburg in Freyburg, the Zeddenbach mill and others.

In addition to overnight stays, the leisure and tourism club also offers bicycle and canoe tours as well as guided hikes to the nearby orchid area.

=== Traffic ===
Through Balgstädt the federal highway 176 leads from Bad Bibra to Freyburg. From there, the federal highway 180 leads to the district town of Naumburg (Saale), which is just ten kilometers away.

The place also has a breakpoint at the railway of Unstrut called Naumburg-Nebra-Artern.
