= Größnitz =

- Ortsteil of Balgstädt
- Interactive map of Größnitz
- Location within Germany Location within Saxony-Anhalt
- Coordinates: 51°11′N 11°43′E
- Country: Germany
- State: Saxony-Anhalt
- District: Burgenlandkreis
- Town: Balgstädt

Area
  - Total: 6.29 km^{2} (2.43 sq mi)
- Elevation: 206 m (676 ft)

Population (2006-12-31)
  - Total: 167
  - Density: 26.6/km^{2} (68.8/sq mi)
- Time zone: UTC+01:00 (CET)
  - Summer (DST): UTC+02:00 (CEST)
- Postal codes: 06632
- Dialling codes: 034464
- Website: www.vgem-unstruttal.de

Größnitz is a village and a former municipality in the Burgenlandkreis district, in Saxony-Anhalt, Germany. Since 1 July 2009 it has been part of the municipality of Balgstädt.

== Geography ==
Größnitz is located between Halle (Saale) and Weimar. The village of Städten was part of the former municipality of Größnitz.

== History ==
Größnitz and the other towns belonged to the Wettiner, later Electoral Saxon office of Freyburg until 1815. The decisions of the Congress of Vienna were to give them to Prussia, and in 1816 it was allocated to the district of Querfurt in the administrative region of Merseburg of Saxony Province until 1944.

On 1 July 1950 the previously independent municipality of Städten was incorporated. Größnitz was incorporated into the municipality of Balgstädt on July 1, 2009.

== Coat of Arms ==
Blazon: "In silver a green lily in the gate opening of a continuous, black-grooved red wall abutting at the top on a curved green shield base covered with a curved silver strip."

The coat of arms symbols are based on several local features. The high stone archways are ones that often belong to the homesteads, which are symbolized in the coat of arms by a jointed wall. In the gate opening is the heraldic lily - not as a symbol of purity and innocence, as is often the case - but rather in real terms related to the wild orchids that are common in the region around Großesnitz. The fact that Großesnitz and its district of towns are located on a mountain is indicated by the arched green shield base covered with a curved silver bar. The coat of arms was designed in 2006 by the municipal heraldist Jörg Mantzsch and he was included in the approval process.

The representing colors of the area are green and white.
