= Zeuchfeld =

- Ortsteil of Freyburg
- Interactive map of Zeuchfeld
- Location within Germany Location within Saxony-Anhalt
- Coordinates: 51°14′N 11°50′E
- Country: Germany
- State: Saxony-Anhalt
- District: Burgenlandkreis
- Town: Freyburg

Area
  - Total: 4.70 km^{2} (1.81 sq mi)
- Elevation: 175 m (574 ft)

Population (2006-12-31)
  - Total: 231
  - Density: 49.1/km^{2} (127/sq mi)
- Time zone: UTC+01:00 (CET)
  - Summer (DST): UTC+02:00 (CEST)
- Postal codes: 06632
- Dialling codes: 034464
- Website: www.freyburg-info.de

Zeuchfeld is a village and a former municipality in the Burgenlandkreis district, in Saxony-Anhalt, Germany. Since 1 July 2009, it is part of the town Freyburg.

== Geography ==
Zeuchfeld is located half-way between the cities of Halle and Weimar, near the town of Freyburg of which it is an administrative part. It is situated between forests, vineyards and fields in a shallow valley. This leads to occasional flooding. The hill in the south of the village is called "Naumburger Berg" (Hill of Naumburg) by the local people. Here, there has been a limestone quarry and cherry plantation.

== History ==
The Via Regia or King's Highway, an ancient imperial road, ran through Zeuchfeld until a stone bridge was built in Bad Kösen (building 1368-1404).

On 11 April 1945 the US 777th Tank Battalion part of 28th Infantry Division reached Zeuchfeld on their race eastward.

== Education ==
There had been a school in the village until about 1950. The old half-timbered school building in the centre of the village is one of the largest buildings. Today students from Zeuchfeld commute to Freyburg for primary and secondary education and even further away for higher education.

== Transport ==
The Bundesstraße 176 goes through the village. It leads eastward to Weißenfels where it joins up with the A9 Autobahn and westward to Freyburg.

The village is approached by bus lines 630 and 634 operated by the public transport company PVG Burgenlandkreis mbH. They link it to the towns Freyburg and Laucha and most of the neighboring villages.

== Civic life ==
There are two registered societies in the village the "Zeuchfelder Pfingsburschen e.V.", organising whitsun celebrations, and the "Heimat und Kulturverein Zeuchfeld e.V." organising socializing in the village.

== Economy ==
Only a few people work in agriculture today. Two vineyards operate in the village, this is because it is part of the Saale-Unstrut wine growing area. A few inhabitants work as farmers on the fields surrounding the village. Besides these traditional areas most people commute to the larger cities in the area for work. Although some small businesses operating from Zeuchfeld, most of them are self-employed: e.g. electrical engineering, floor tilting, GP's surgery, landscape conservancy.

== Recreation ==
The public footpath "Göhleweg" (marked with a red cross) goes through the village. It begins in Freyburg at the Jahnplatz and runs through Schützenstraße - Schlifterberg - Burgholzweg - Sühnekreuz - Alte Göhle - Zeuchfeld - Branderoda - Ebersroda - Neue Göhle - Galgenberg until it reaches the Bodelschwingh memorial in the northwest of Freyburg.

== Notable people ==
- Johann Sperling physician, zoologist, physicist (born 1603 died 1658)

== See also ==
- Burgenlandkreis
