= Karsdorf =

- Municipality
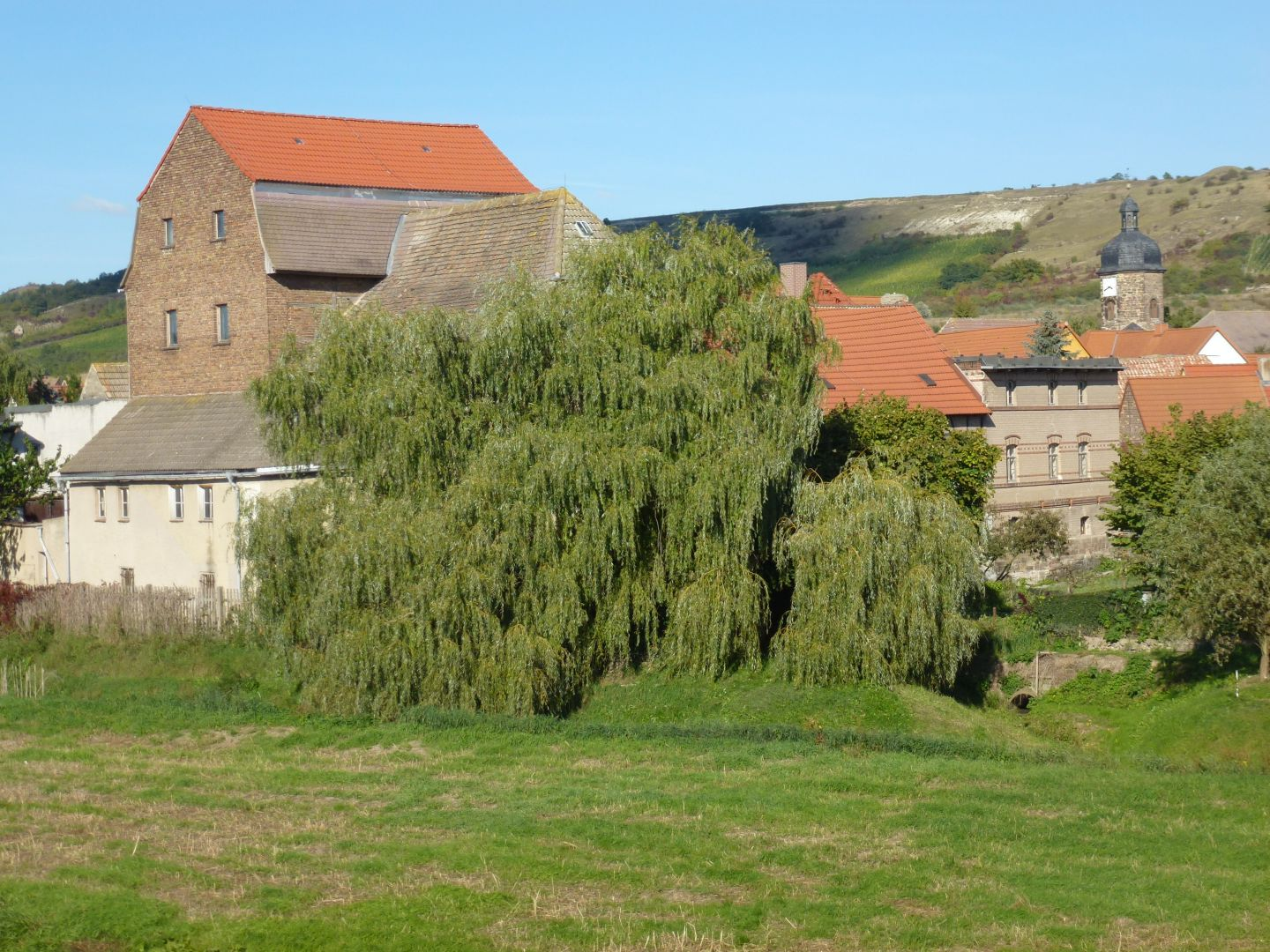
- View of Karsdorf

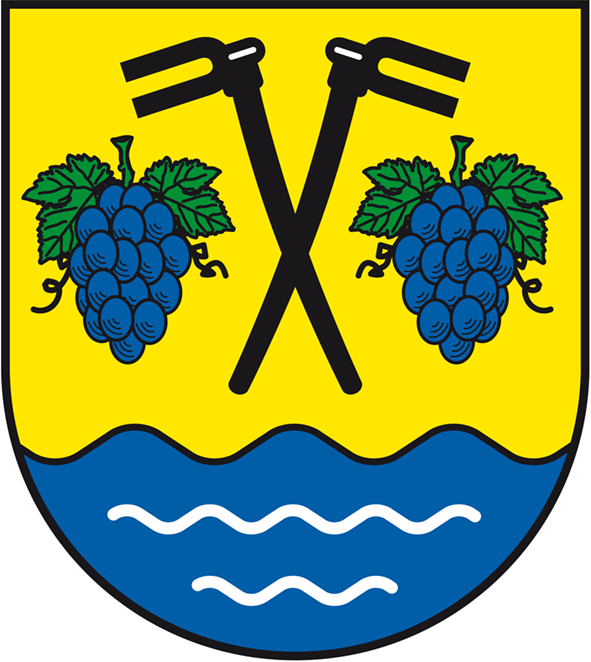
- Coat of arms

- Location of Karsdorf within Burgenlandkreis district
- Interactive map of Karsdorf
- Location within Germany Location within Saxony-Anhalt
- Coordinates: 51°17′N 11°39′E
- Country: Germany
- State: Saxony-Anhalt
- District: Burgenlandkreis
- Municipal assoc.: Unstruttal
- Subdivisions: 3

Government
  - Mayor (2019–26): Olaf Schumann

Area
  - Total: 19.84 km^{2} (7.66 sq mi)
- Elevation: 149 m (489 ft)

Population (2025-12-31)
  - Total: 1,335
  - Density: 67.29/km^{2} (174.3/sq mi)
- Time zone: UTC+01:00 (CET)
  - Summer (DST): UTC+02:00 (CEST)
- Postal codes: 06638
- Dialling codes: 034461
- Vehicle registration: BLK
- Website: www.karsdorf.de

Karsdorf is a municipality in the Burgenlandkreis district, in Saxony-Anhalt, Germany.

== Geography ==
Karsdorf is located between Nebra (Unstrut) and Burgscheidungen on the Unstrut. In Steigra branches off in southwest direction a side road from the state road 180, which leads to Karsdorf. Districts of the municipality are Karsdorf, Wetzendorf and Wennungen.

== History ==
=== Karsdorf remains ===
Recently, Karsdorf became known for its genetic testimonies. Haak et al. published the DNA of an older, male individual "KAR6a" from Karsdorf. He belonged to the Human mitochondrial DNA haplogroup H1 and the Y-haplogroup R, and was dated ca 5207-5070 BC, which was the time of the Early-Neolithic Linear Pottery.

The other, female individual was dated ca 2564-2475 cal. BC, the time of the Corded Ware culture (German Schnurkeramik); she belonged to the mitochondrial haplogroup H.

=== Post-Christian settlements ===
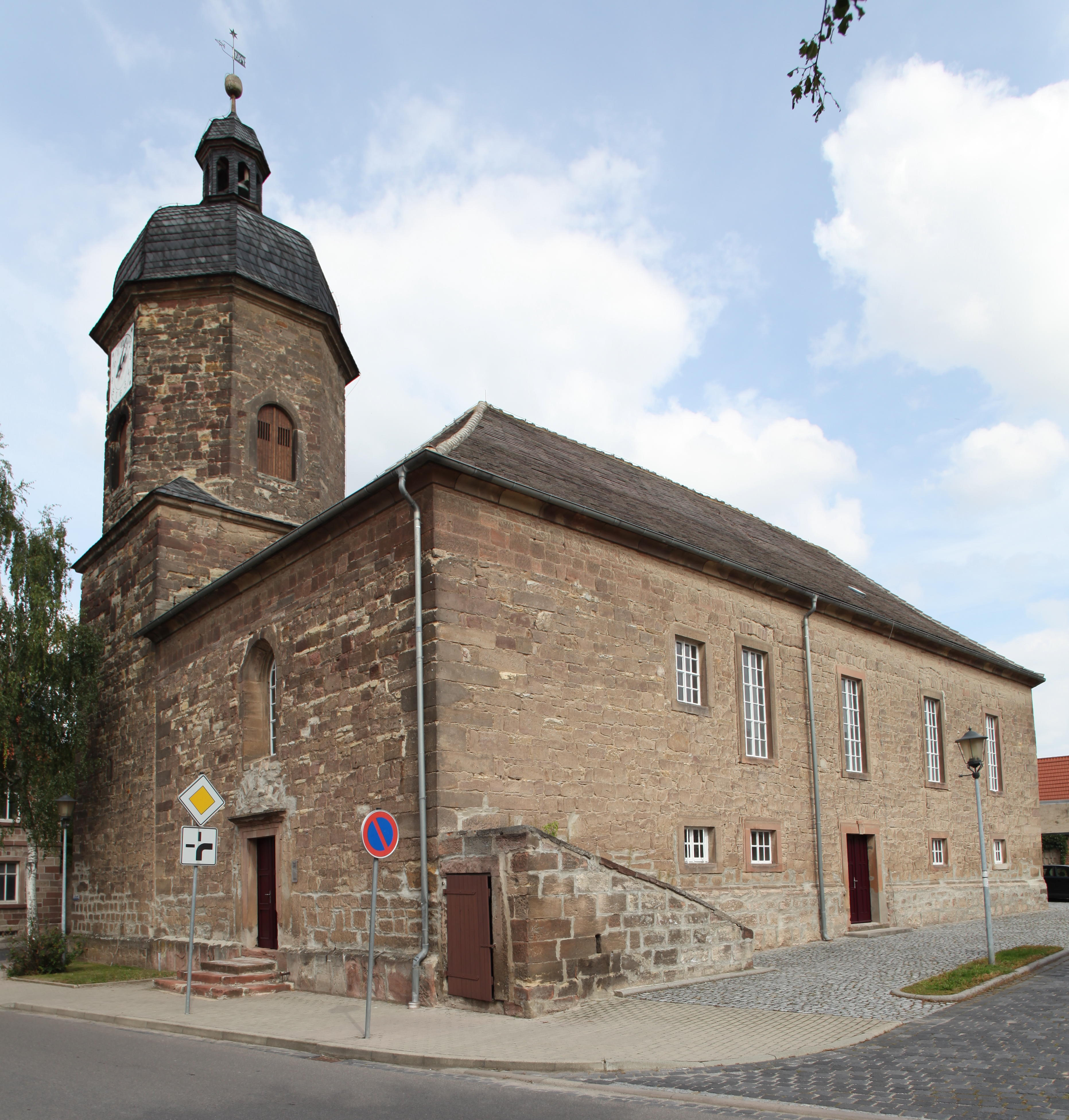
Evangelical Church of St. Lawrence in Karsdorf.

Saint Lawrence, the patron saint of the Karsdorf village church, and St. Martin of Tours for the church of the defunct village Bünisdorf (also Pinsdorf ) stand for this early origin. Karsdorf is first mentioned as a tithing place Coriledorpf in the Hersfeld Abbey tithing document dating from between 881 and 899.

Founded as a Franconian foundation on the old Franconia, Wein- or Kupferstraße Karsdorf is mentioned in 1109 as Karlestorph in a document. The name "Karlestorph" has nothing to do with the karst, which is shown in the seal, but rather is to be understood as "village of a Karl", the well-known Frankish name. The seal of the place, however, clearly refers to the local wine, which was already widespread among the Franks and in the 12th century first documented.

It was built directly on the ford by the Unstrut, to whose protection soon a castle was built on the high ridge, which was initially owned by the Counts of Mansfeld, then passed to the Noble Lords of Querfurt and their legacy after extinction in The second half of the 15th century fell largely to the House of Wettin. The research also starts from a second castle site.

Decisive for the establishment of the town and its further development was the location on the Unstrut and the Unstrutfurt, which existed only a few meters from the present Karsdorfer bridge. This ford crossed the Kupferstrasse, that old traffic artery that was a continuation of the Königsstrasse. The large copper transports went from Mansfeld to Eisleben to Nuremberg and further south.

In Karsdorf had the family of Rockhausen, gentlemen on Kirchscheidungen from 1428 to 1608 held a noble court.

At least since 1469 had Duke William III. Karsdorf as Amtsdorf completely integrated into the office Freyburg. The town was the seat of a separate district court chair with special judges and jury members. Here court was held and representatives of the associated villages summoned.

1589 lived 61 landlords in the village, including 20 Anspänner and 41 Hintersättler. After the devastating fire of 1608, which fell victim to 117 houses "including the beautiful, newly built church, parish, school, mill, brewery, bakery and Keltern", those of Rockhausen gave up their goods lying there. On 29 April 1823 a fire started by an arsonist devastated 16 houses in the village, together with numerous cattle.

By desolate villages in the area, the village center of Karsdorf was substantially enlarged, these include Siegerstedt (881/899: Sigiristat, 1589: Seigerstett ), Bünsdorf ( Bunisdorp, 1589: Bunßdorf ) and Wölbitz ( Wülbiz, 1589: Welfitz ).

Even the church is in the core of late Gothic, but the present form received it after the reconstruction in 1701 and in the 19th century. The baroque cart above the tower clock has the year of construction 1701 inscribed. The bell in the tower dates from 1666 and was made in the workshop of the Magdeburg foundry Jakob Wenzel.

In 1767, Robert Schumann's mother was baptized in the church, a plaque on the church commemorates it.

In 1815 Karsdorf arrived at the district of Querfurt in the administrative district of Merseburg in the Prussian province of Saxony . At GDR time the place belonged to the circle Nebra .

=== Karsdorf cement works ===
1927 was founded in the Karsdorf cement works. A location advantage was the presence of limestone and various clay minerals at Karsdof.

During the Second World War, many women and men from German-occupied countries had to do forced labor in the cement factory, many of whom died.

The great demand for cement in the GDR led to the plant deactivating its environmental technology, which would have made production more expensive or slower. The result was a pollution of the environment with cement dust and ashes from the firing system.

With the takeover of the work by Lafarge Group in 1990, the plant became one of the most modern and efficient plants of the Lafarge Group until the year 2000.

== Economy ==
=== Industry ===
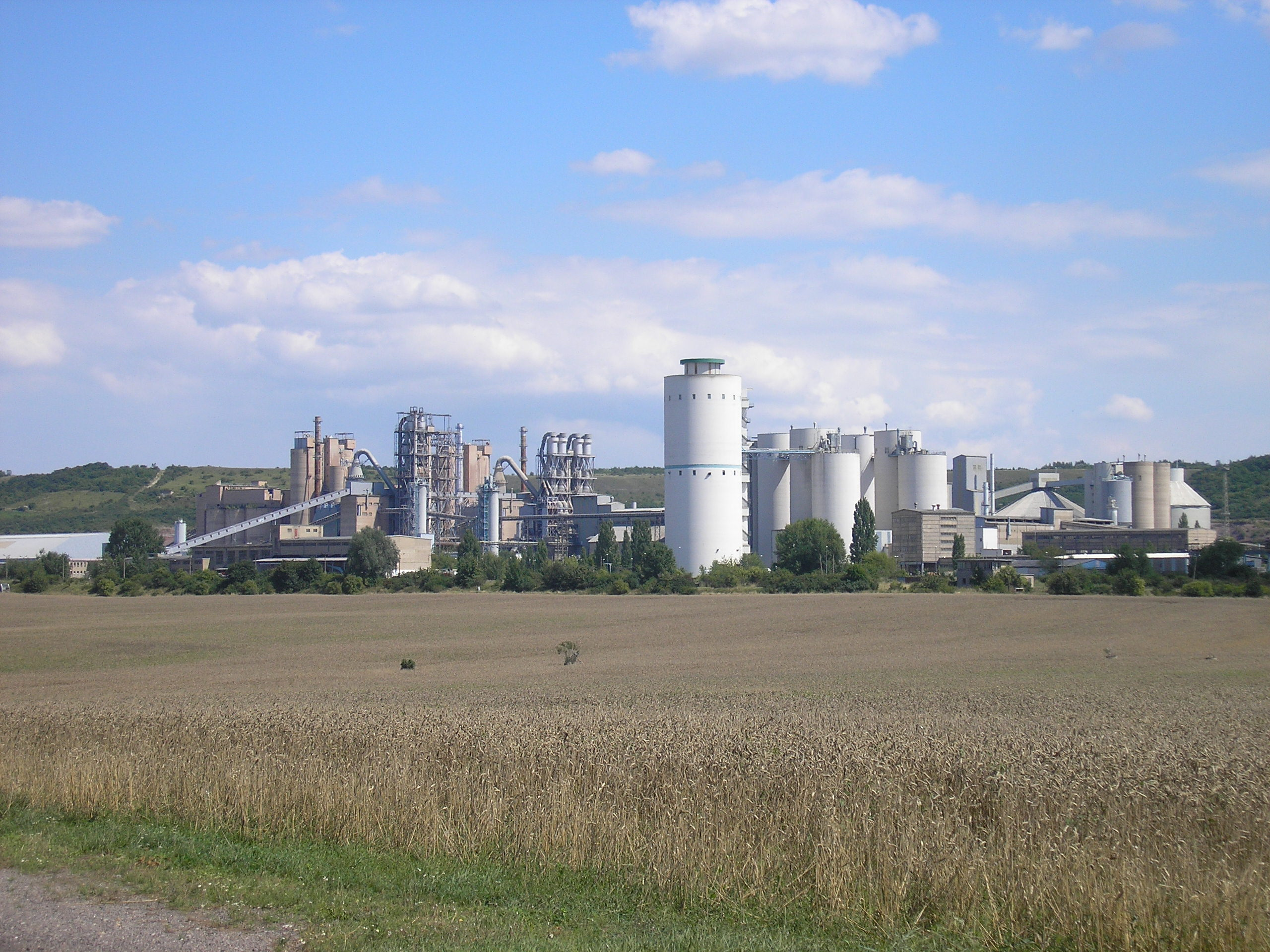
Karsdorf cement plant.

Main employer of the municipality is the cement plant Karsdorf, which belongs to OPTERRA GmbH. Today, about 200 people work in the cement plant, which produces for the national, but also international market. The cement industry, which originated in Karsdorf in 1928, is still influential in this town today. This development was strongly influenced by the many natural deposits of limestone, clay and sand.

=== Tourism ===
The Unstrut cycle path leads through the village. A canoe and bicycle station also offers water walkers the necessary infrastructure.

Through the Unstruttal bridge, the nearby castle in Burgscheidungen and the Nebra sky disk, tourists are increasingly driving through the town.

== Memorials ==
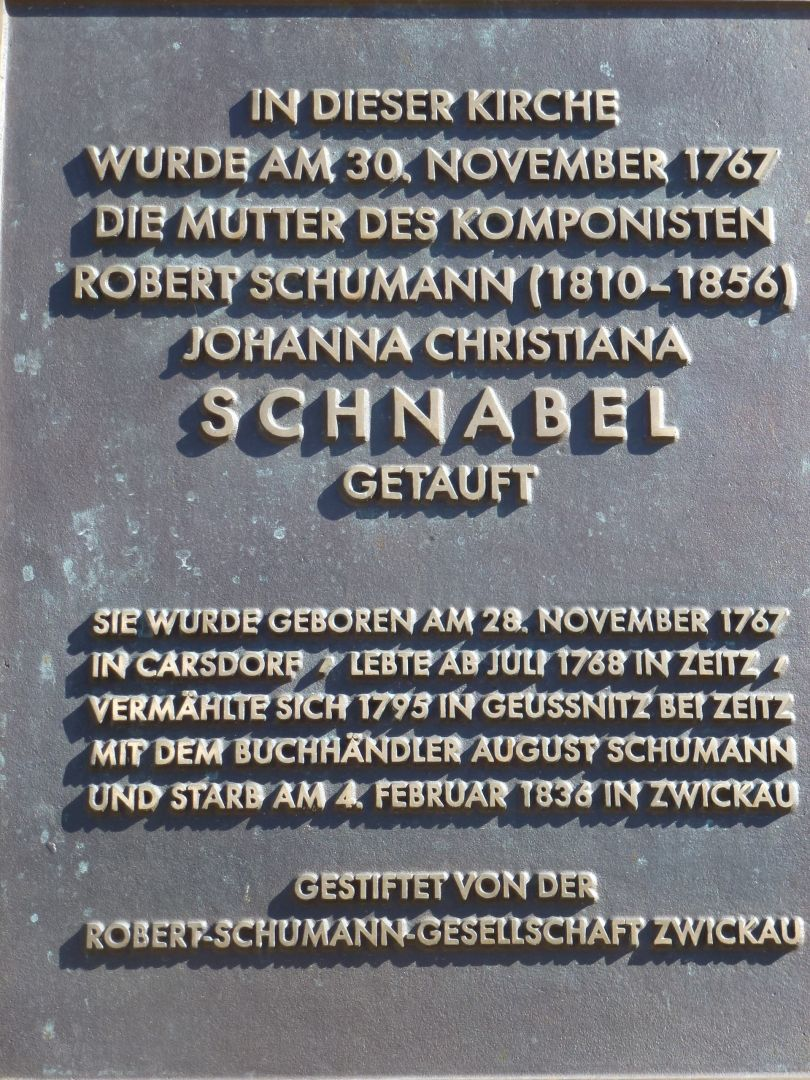
Commemorative plaque for the mother of Robert Schumann.

- Commemorative stone from 1970 in front of the Hans Beimler school in the promenade in memory of the Polish forced laborers who were victims of this forced labor during the Second World War
- Commemorative plaque from 2012 at the St. Lawrence's Church in memory of the birth and baptism (28th / 30th Nov. 1767) of the mother of the composer Robert Schumann, Johanna Christiana Schnabel. Donated by the Robert Schumann Society Zwickau.

== Personalities ==
- Gustav Schmidt (1894-1943), officer, last lieutenant general in the Second World War
- Paul Jaeger (1869-1963), theologian, member of the German Christians and writers
- Johanna Christiana Schumann b. Schnabel (born 28 November 1767 in Karsdorf, died 4 February 1836 in Zwickau), mother of the composer Robert Schumann, came here as the daughter of the army surgeon in the Karabinier Regiment Abraham Gottlob Schnabel and was born on 30 November 1767 in the Baptized St. Lawrence's Church.
