= Friedrich Ludwig Jahn Memorial Gymnasium =

Coordinates: 51°12′51″N 11°46′14″E

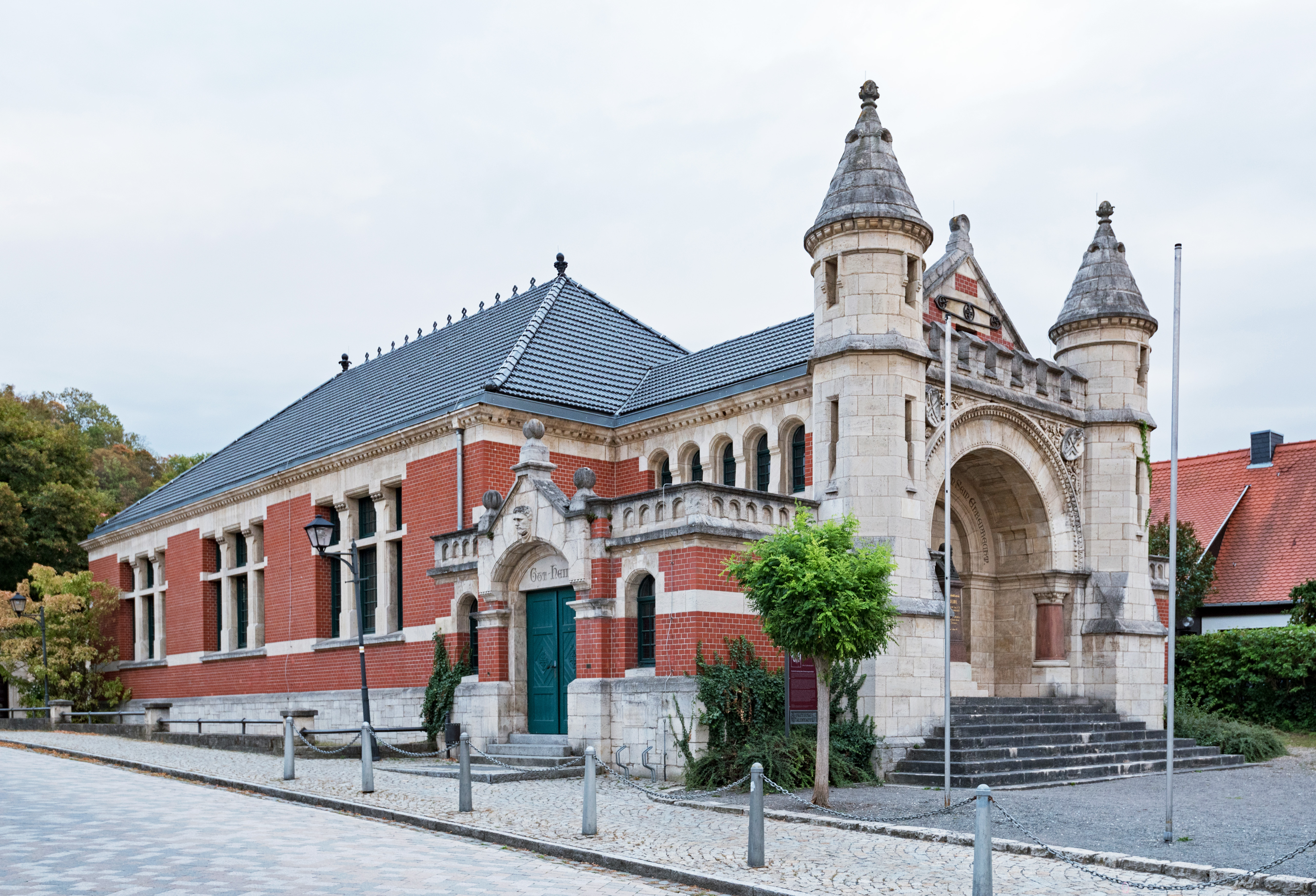
The Memorial Gymnasium viewed from the southwest.

The Friedrich Ludwig Jahn Memorial Gymnasium (German: Friedrich-Ludwig-Jahn-Erinnerungsturnhalle) in Freyburg, Germany, is a listed historic building that combines a gymnasium with a memorial. It was built in 1894 in the Neo-Romanesque style to commemorate Friedrich Ludwig Jahn (1778–1852), the founder of the German gymnastics movement. The design was created by architect Georg Weidenbach from Leipzig, and the site chosen was the former cemetery located outside the Obertor gate. During construction, Jahn's remains were transferred in March 1894 to a specially constructed crypt beneath the northwestern gable of the gymnasium. The initiative for the building came from the Deutschen Turnerschaft (German Gymnastics Association) along with private supporters. Upon completion, the gymnasium was presented as a gift from the Deutschen Turnerschaft to the town of Freyburg. Today, it is regarded as an important architectural testament to the gymnastics and commemorative culture of the late 19th century.

== Construction history ==
After his release from prison in 1825, Jahn was prohibited by authorities from settling in university or high school towns. As a result, he and his newlywed second wife Emilie (1802–1876) moved to the relatively insignificant town of Freyburg. There, he lived as a pensioner – initially under strict police surveillance and with some interruptions. After Jahn’s death in October 1852, he was buried in the then-city-adjacent cemetery outside the Obertor. The grave fell into disrepair over the following years until gymnasts began campaigning for its restoration in 1858. In October of the following year, a bust was unveiled above the grave – an early work by the later-renowned sculptor Johannes Schilling, known for the Niederwald monument.

Although the construction of an honorary gymnasium in Freyburg was first proposed at the 4th German Gymnastics Festival in Bonn in 1872, the initiative initially had no results. Various attempts – such as the publication of Jahn's so-called "Swan Speech" by Eduard Arnold and a brochure by Hildebrandt-Strehlen intended to raise funds – brought in very little revenue.

The first concrete financial support was secured in 1883 at the 8th German Gymnastics Day in Eisenach—1,500 marks were approved for enclosing Jahn’s grave with an iron fence, which was completed two years later. The real breakthrough came in 1888, when Wilhelm Schadewell, a wealthy merchant, proposed the idea of constructing a gymnastics and memorial hall over Jahn’s grave in honor of the “Turnvater.” The German Gymnastics Association adopted the idea, and in July 1890, its committee in Munich approved the construction, including a memorial room. In 1891, the committee in Hanover approved a construction loan of 15,000 marks from the F. Goetz Foundation for Gymnastic Facilities. Since the cemetery outside the Obertor had not been used since about 1860, the city of Freyburg could provide the land. On 30 June 1893, the regional president in Merseburg granted the final construction permit. The design came from Leipzig architect Georg Weidenbach, and construction was executed by a local mason. The total construction cost, including furnishings, amounted to approximately 30,000 marks.

On 6 March 1894, Jahn’s remains were exhumed, placed in a new coffin, and reburied in a crypt under the northwestern gable of the gymnasium. Above it, Schilling’s monument from the original grave, formerly near the city wall, was erected. After a short construction period, the hall was ceremonially inaugurated on 10 June 1894, with 3,000 gymnasts in attendance. On the day of the inauguration, the German Gymnastics Association handed over the building to the city of Freyburg as a gift, under the condition that the DT would be permanently allowed to use and operate the Jahn Museum free of charge. Starting in autumn 1894, the Jahn Memorial Room was set up as the first museum in honor of Friedrich Ludwig Jahn and was officially opened on 20 April 1895. The exhibition was based on gymnastic historical items that had been collected for the archive of the German Gymnastics Association. The archive itself remained in the Goetz House in Leipzig until 1922.

It soon became clear that the existing memorial gymnasium no longer met the growing demands of a national memorial. The German Gymnastics Association therefore decided to construct another memorial hall. In 1903, the Jahn Memorial Hall (Jahn-Ehrenhalle) was opened in the immediate vicinity of the gymnasium. It was deliberately designed as a place of national self-affirmation. This is expressed, among other things, in the richly decorated stained-glass windows showing the coats of arms of cities where German Gymnastics Festivals had been held. During the 1936 Olympic Games in Berlin, Jahn's remains were transferred from the "Memorial Gymnasium" to the crypt on the grounds of the Jahn House.

The Friedrich Ludwig Jahn Memorial Gymnasium is still actively used today – both for school and club sports – and is protected as a significant cultural and historical monument. The building was renovated in the 1990s, and an underground sanitary wing was added.

== Description ==
Located at 9 Oberstraße in the northeastern quarter of Freyburg's historic town center, the Memorial Gymnasium stands between Schützenstraße and the town's ancient wall, approximately 30 meters from the Jahn Memorial Hall. The memorial hall is built as a so-called standard gymnasium with interior dimensions of 23 m × 12 m × 6.14 m. It was constructed in the Neo-Romanesque style. The striking northwestern gable, which refers to the city's coat of arms, features two small towers, battlements, and a deeply recessed niche above the crypt. The niche bears the inscription: “Posterity restores everyone to their rightful honor,” executed by Leipzig painter Schulze. Eight sandstone steps lead up to the niche. The bronze bust in the niche is, as noted above, the same one created by Johannes Schilling for Jahn’s original grave.

The gymnasium was constructed using brick with joints and architectural elements made from Freyburg limestone. The roof was covered with glazed interlocking tiles from Ludwigshafen. Inside, the hall has a simple wooden ceiling, plain wall paneling, and a yellow pine floor laid in asphalt. The equipment included a rich yet decorative and functional set of gymnastic apparatuses, supplied by the firm Dietrich & Hannak of Chemnitz. The adjacent northeastern room was designed as the Jahn Museum. It is 5.72 meters high and naturally lit by skylight windows. Originally, the gymnasium was lit by petroleum lamps and heated by two large regulation stoves. The gymnastic equipment inventory also came from Dietrich & Hannak in Chemnitz.

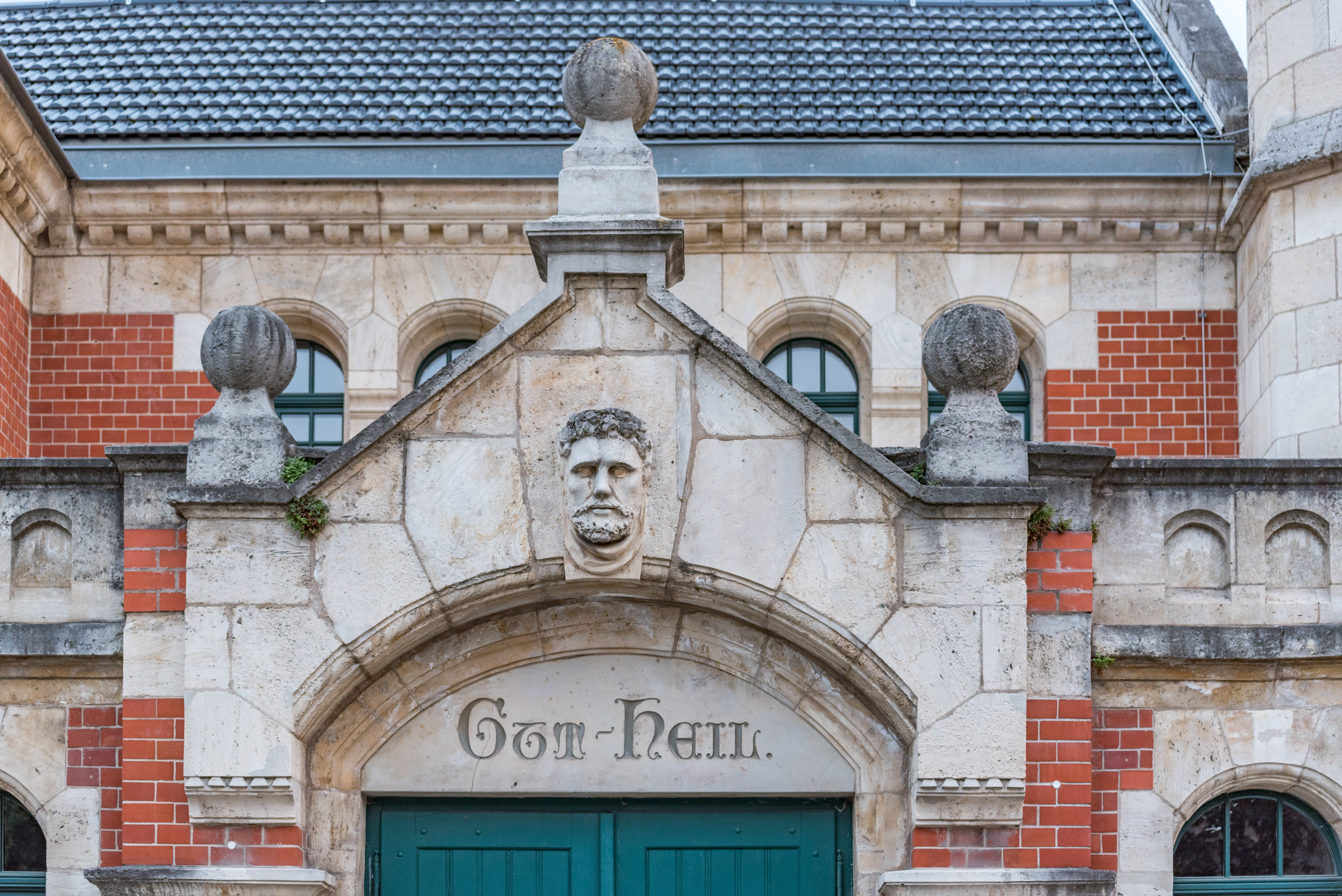

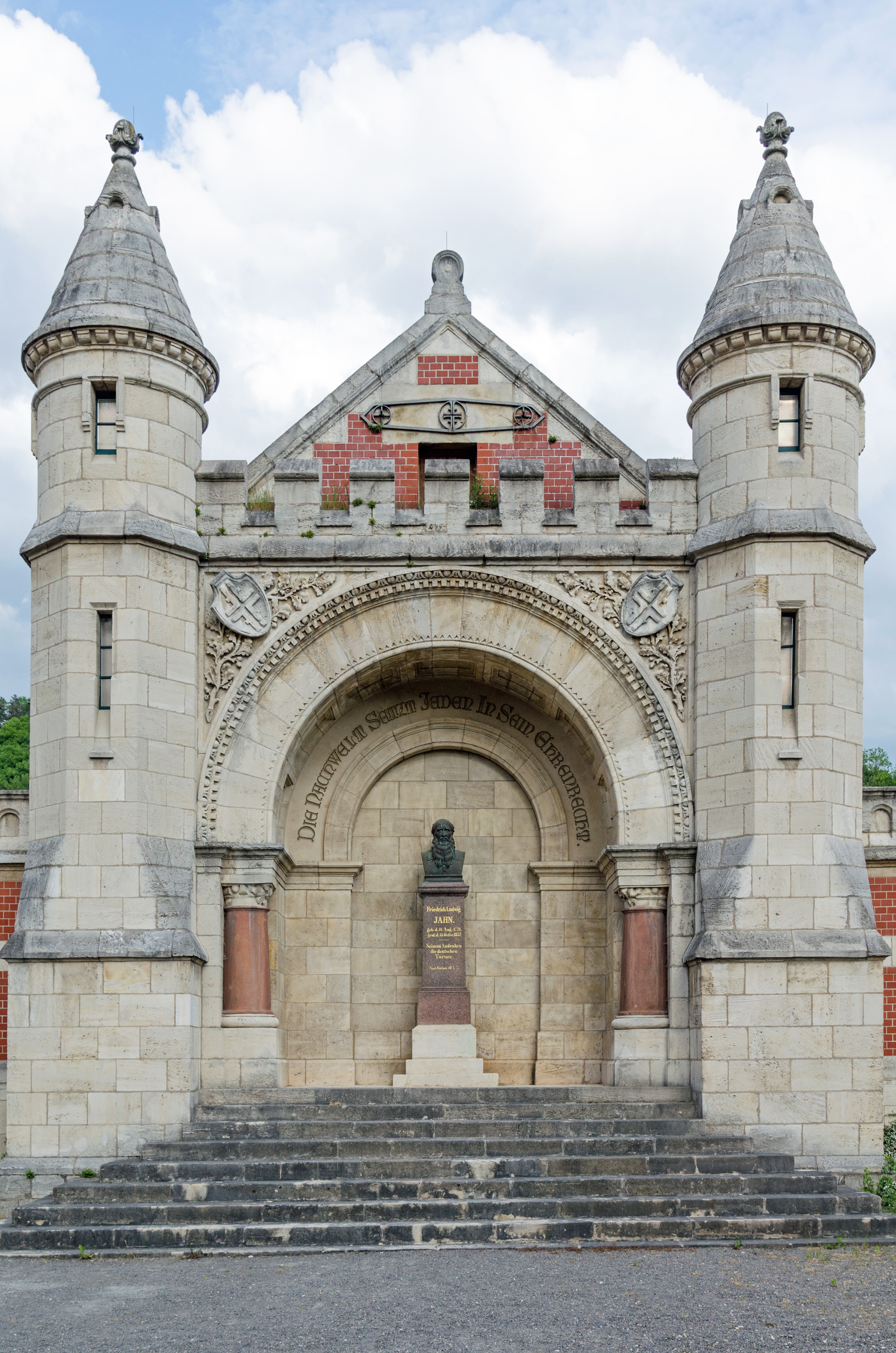

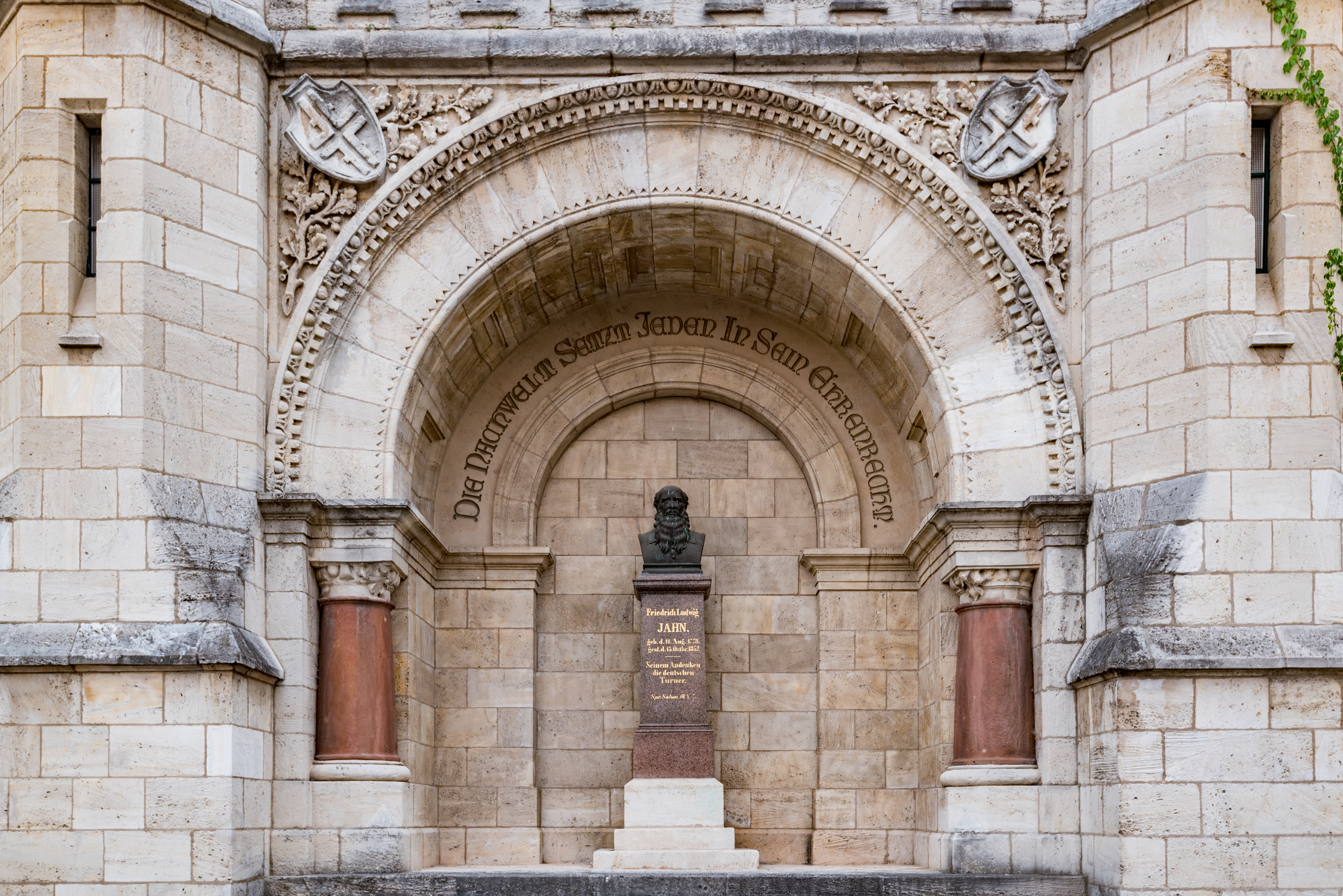

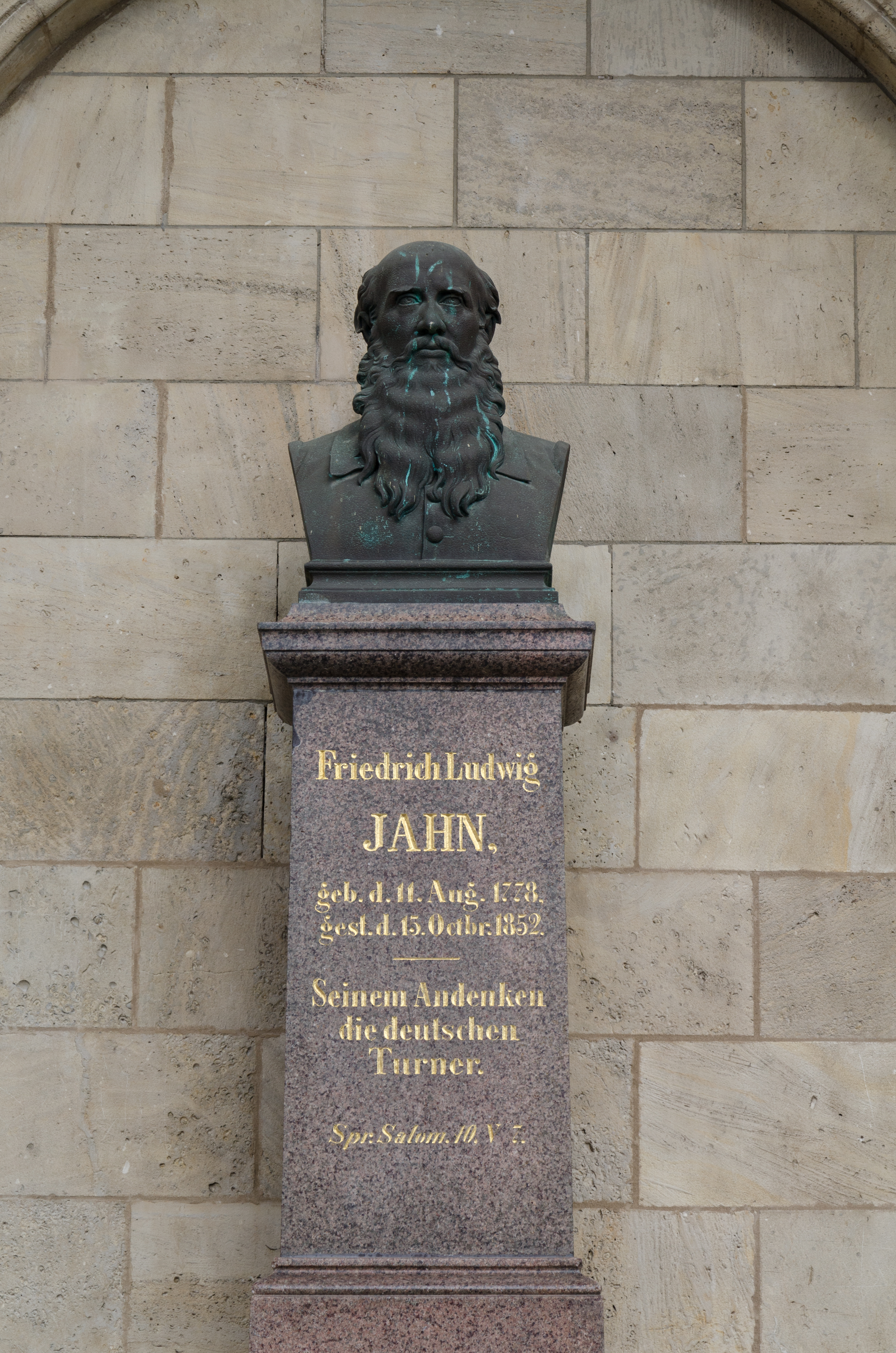

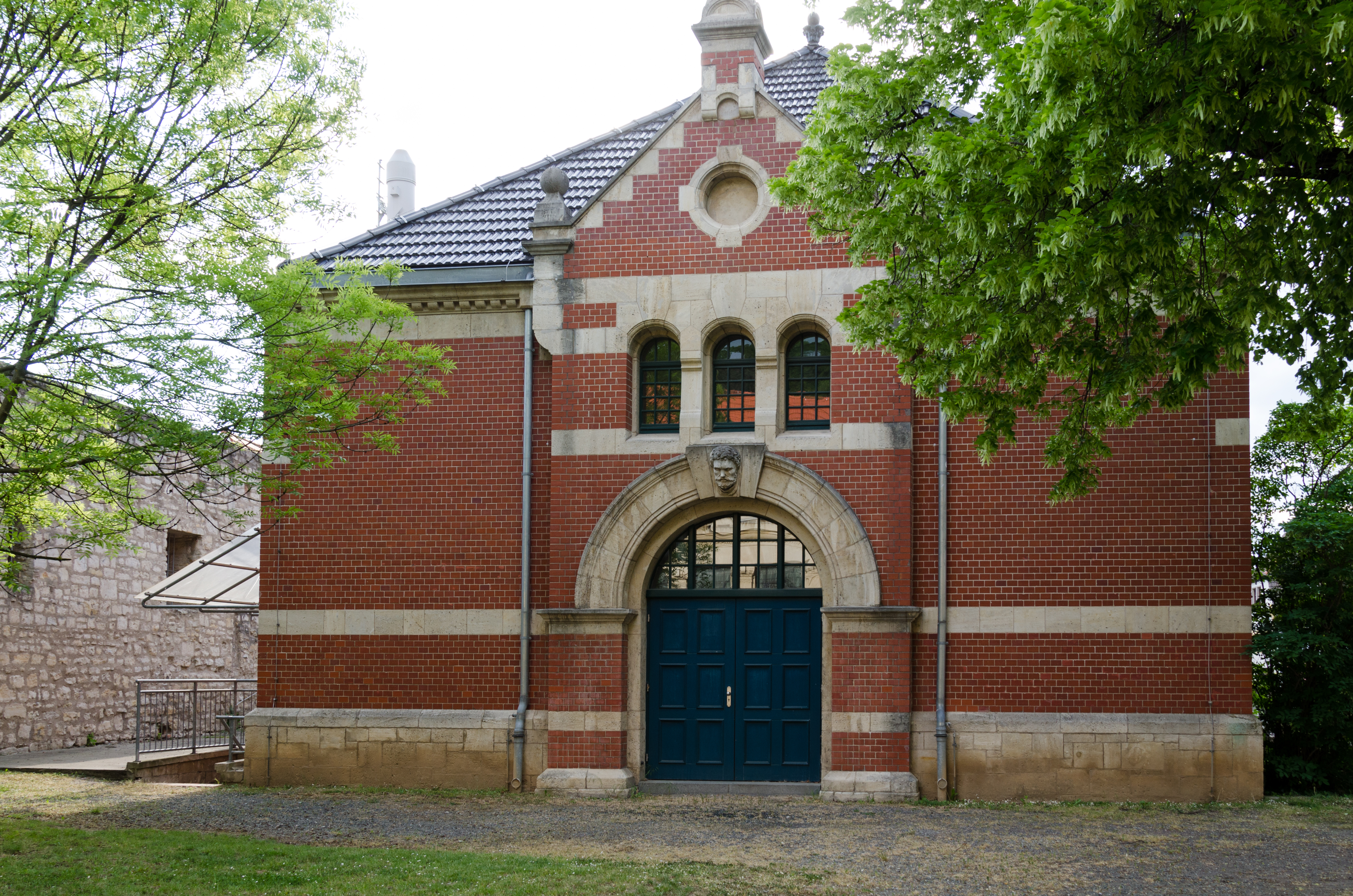

== Bibliography ==
- Stein, Gerd. "120 Jahre Jahn-Erinnerungsturnhalle in Freyburg." Sport in Sachsen-Anhalt. Zeitschrift des Landessportbundes Sachsen-Anhalt e.V., no. 2 (2014), p. 8.
- Wendland, Ulrike. "Gedenken an Friedrich Ludwig Jahn in Freyburg. Die Ehrenhalle und die neoromanische Erinnerungsturnhalle." In Kulturgeschichte aus Sachsen-Anhalt, edited by Harald Meller and Alfred Reichenberger, Halle an der Saale, 2011, pp. 82f.
