= Pödelist =

- Stadtteil of Freyburg
- Interactive map of Pödelist
- Location within Germany Location within Saxony-Anhalt
- Coordinates: 51°12′N 11°50′E
- Country: Germany
- State: Saxony-Anhalt
- District: Burgenlandkreis
- Town: Freyburg

Area
  - Total: 10.57 km^{2} (4.08 sq mi)
- Elevation: 169 m (554 ft)

Population (2006-12-31)
  - Total: 338
  - Density: 32.0/km^{2} (82.8/sq mi)
- Time zone: UTC+01:00 (CET)
  - Summer (DST): UTC+02:00 (CEST)
- Postal codes: 06618
- Dialling codes: 034464
- Website: www.freyburg-info.de

Pödelist is a village and a former municipality in the Burgenlandkreis district, in Saxony-Anhalt, Germany. Since 1 July 2009, it is part of the town Freyburg.
