= Hirschroda =

- Ortsteil of Balgstädt
- Coat of arms
- Interactive map of Hirschroda
- Location within Germany Location within Saxony-Anhalt
- Coordinates: 51°12′21″N 11°41′08″E
- Country: Germany
- State: Saxony-Anhalt
- District: Burgenlandkreis
- Town: Balgstädt

Area
  - Total: 6.29 km^{2} (2.43 sq mi)
- Elevation: 232 m (761 ft)

Population (2006-12-31)
  - Total: 181
  - Density: 28.8/km^{2} (74.5/sq mi)
- Time zone: UTC+01:00 (CET)
  - Summer (DST): UTC+02:00 (CEST)
- Postal codes: 06636
- Dialling codes: 034462

Hirschroda is a village and a former municipality in the Burgenlandkreis district, in Saxony-Anhalt, Germany. Since 1 July 2009, it is part of the municipality Balgstädt.
