= Weischütz =

- Stadtteil of Freyburg
- Interactive map of Weischütz
- Location within Germany Location within Saxony-Anhalt
- Coordinates: 51°13′N 11°42′E
- Country: Germany
- State: Saxony-Anhalt
- District: Burgenlandkreis
- Town: Freyburg

Area
  - Total: 3.18 km^{2} (1.23 sq mi)
- Elevation: 114 m (374 ft)

Population (2006-12-31)
  - Total: 184
  - Density: 57.9/km^{2} (150/sq mi)
- Time zone: UTC+01:00 (CET)
  - Summer (DST): UTC+02:00 (CEST)
- Postal codes: 06636
- Dialling codes: 034462

Weischütz is a village and a former municipality in the Burgenlandkreis district, in Saxony-Anhalt, Germany. Since 1 July 2009, it is part of the town Freyburg.
