= Kirchscheidungen =

- Stadtteil of Laucha an der Unstrut
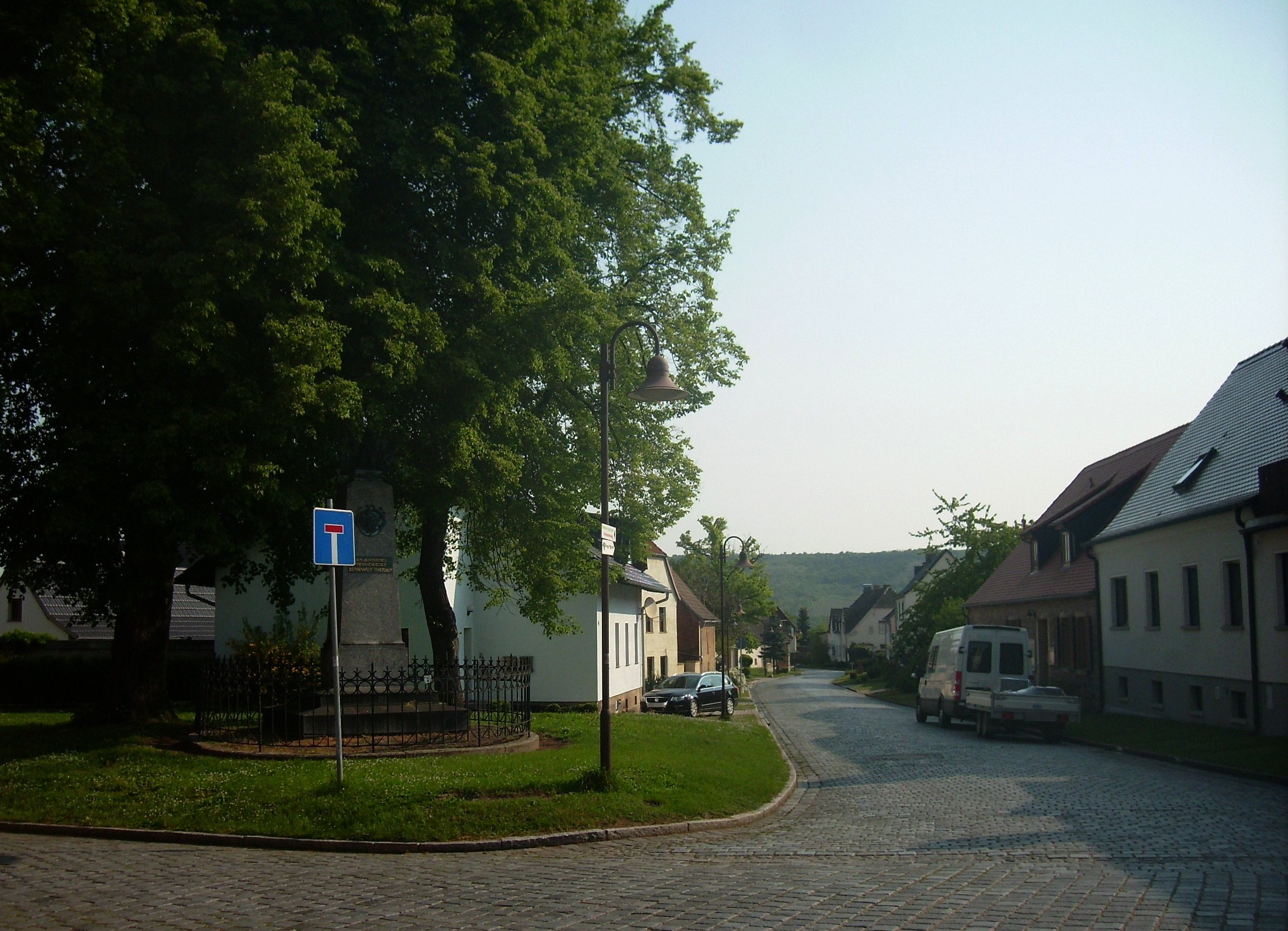
- Interactive map of Kirchscheidungen
- Location within Germany Location within Saxony-Anhalt
- Coordinates: 51°15′N 11°39′E
- Country: Germany
- State: Saxony-Anhalt
- District: Burgenlandkreis
- Town: Laucha an der Unstrut

Area
  - Total: 5.67 km^{2} (2.19 sq mi)
- Elevation: 112 m (367 ft)

Population (2006-12-31)
  - Total: 365
  - Density: 64.4/km^{2} (167/sq mi)
- Time zone: UTC+01:00 (CET)
  - Summer (DST): UTC+02:00 (CEST)
- Postal codes: 06636
- Dialling codes: 034462
- Website: www.freyburg-info.de

Kirchscheidungen is a village and a former municipality in the Burgenlandkreis district, in Saxony-Anhalt, Germany. Since 1 July 2009, it is part of the town Laucha an der Unstrut.

Kirchscheidungen is situated on the river Unstrut in the Saale-Unstrut wine region. For tourists, there is a campsite and a canoe rental on the river. The village is served by a railway station.
