= Laucha an der Unstrut =

- Town
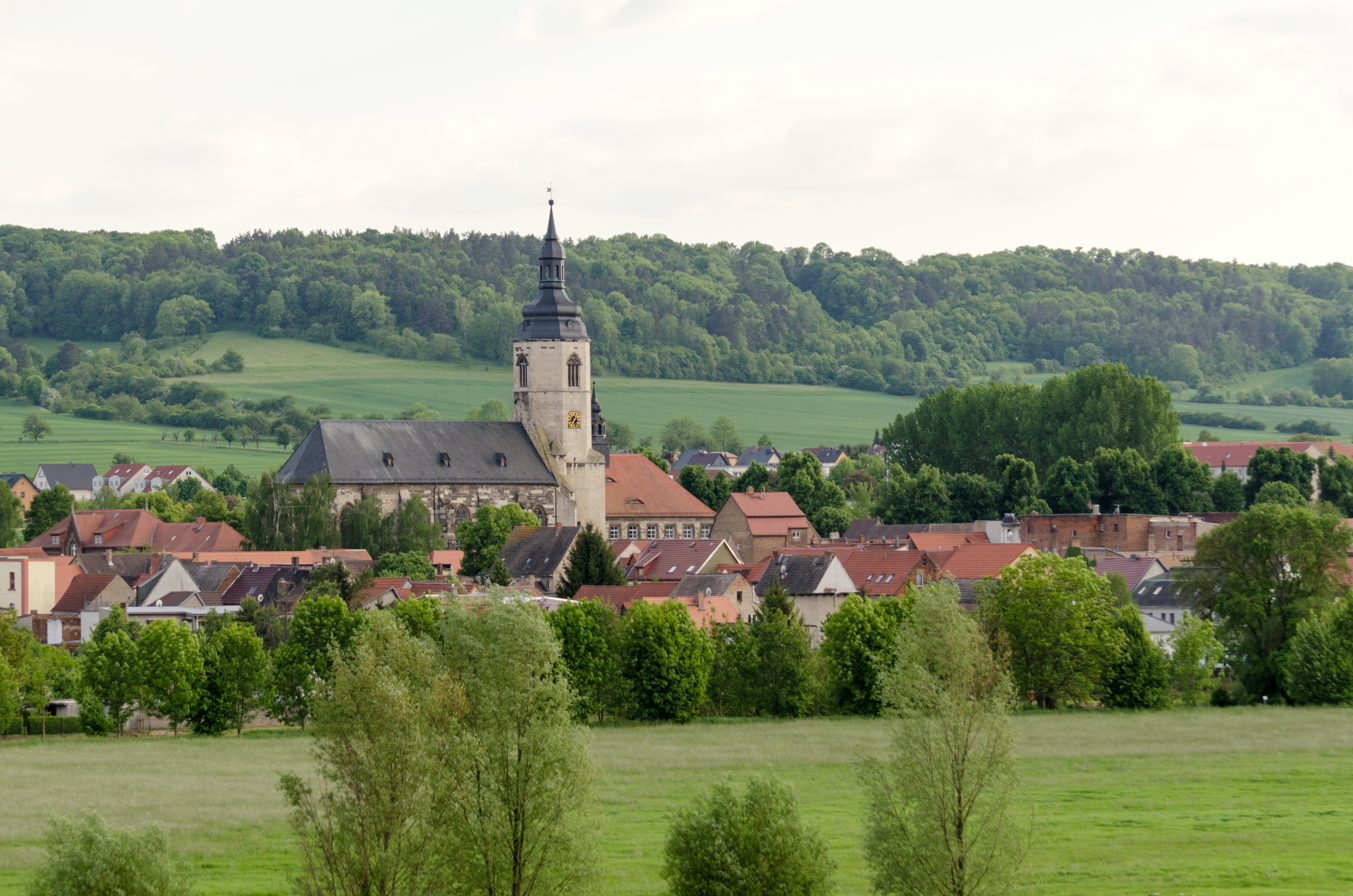

- Coat of arms

- Location of Laucha an der Unstrut within Burgenlandkreis district
- Interactive map of Laucha an der Unstrut
- Location within Germany Location within Saxony-Anhalt
- Coordinates: 51°13′25″N 11°40′47″E
- Country: Germany
- State: Saxony-Anhalt
- District: Burgenlandkreis
- Municipal assoc.: Unstruttal

Government
  - Mayor (2024–31): Michael Bilstein

Area
  - Total: 31.14 km^{2} (12.02 sq mi)
- Elevation: 196 m (643 ft)

Population (2025-12-31)
  - Total: 2,624
  - Density: 84.26/km^{2} (218.2/sq mi)
- Time zone: UTC+01:00 (CET)
  - Summer (DST): UTC+02:00 (CEST)
- Postal codes: 06636
- Dialling codes: 034462
- Vehicle registration: BLK
- Website: www.stadt-laucha.de

Laucha an der Unstrut (German pronunciation: [ˈlaʊxa ʔan deːɐ̯ ˈʊnʃtʁuːt, - ˈʊnstʁuːt], lit. 'Laucha on the Unstrut') is a town in the Burgenlandkreis district, in Saxony-Anhalt, Germany. It is situated on the river Unstrut, 13 kilometres (8 mi) northwest of Naumburg and 7 kilometres (4 mi) west of Freyburg. It is part of the Verbandsgemeinde (collective municipality) of Unstruttal and is in the Saale-Unstrut wine region. On 1 July 2009 it absorbed the former municipalities Burgscheidungen and Kirchscheidungen.
