= Unstruttal (Verbandsgemeinde) =

Collective municipality in Saxony-Anhalt, Germany

- Verbandsgemeinde
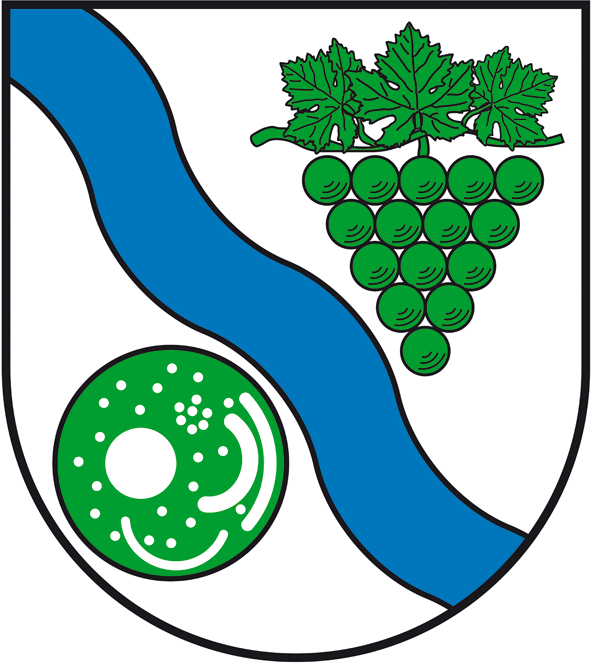
- Coat of arms

- Map of Burgenlandkreis highlighting Unstruttal
- Interactive map of Unstruttal
- Location within Germany Location within Saxony-Anhalt
- Coordinates: 51°13′N 11°46′E
- Country: Germany
- State: Saxony-Anhalt
- District: Burgenlandkreis
- Seat: Freyburg
- Subdivisions: 7 municipalities

Area
  - Total: 199.92 km^{2} (77.19 sq mi)

Population (2025-12-31)
  - Total: 14,457
  - Density: 72.314/km^{2} (187.29/sq mi)
- Time zone: UTC+01:00 (CET)
  - Summer (DST): UTC+02:00 (CEST)
- Website: www.verbgem-unstruttal.de

Unstruttal is a Verbandsgemeinde (association municipality) in the Burgenlandkreis (district), in Saxony-Anhalt, Germany. Before 1 January 2010, it was a Verwaltungsgemeinschaft (administrative community). It is situated along the river Unstrut, approximately 50 km west of Leipzig. The seat of the Verbandsgemeinde is in Freyburg.

The Verbandsgemeinde Unstruttal consists of the following municipalities:

1. Balgstädt
2. Freyburg
3. Gleina
4. Goseck
5. Karsdorf
6. Laucha an der Unstrut
7. Nebra
