= Burkersroda =

- Ortsteil of Balgstädt
- Interactive map of Burkersroda
- Location within Germany Location within Saxony-Anhalt
- Coordinates: 51°10′39″N 11°38′32″E
- Country: Germany
- State: Saxony-Anhalt
- District: Burgenlandkreis
- Town: Balgstädt

Area
  - Total: 12.63 km^{2} (4.88 sq mi)
- Elevation: 286 m (938 ft)

Population (2006-12-31)
  - Total: 323
  - Density: 25.6/km^{2} (66.2/sq mi)
- Time zone: UTC+01:00 (CET)
  - Summer (DST): UTC+02:00 (CEST)
- Postal codes: 06647
- Dialling codes: 034465
- Vehicle registration: BLK
- Website: www.freyburg-info.de

Burkersroda is a village and a former municipality in the Burgenlandkreis district, in Saxony-Anhalt, Germany. Since 1 July 2009, it is part of the municipality Balgstädt.
