= Freyburg, Germany =

Town in Saxony-Anhalt, Germany

Freyburg
- Town
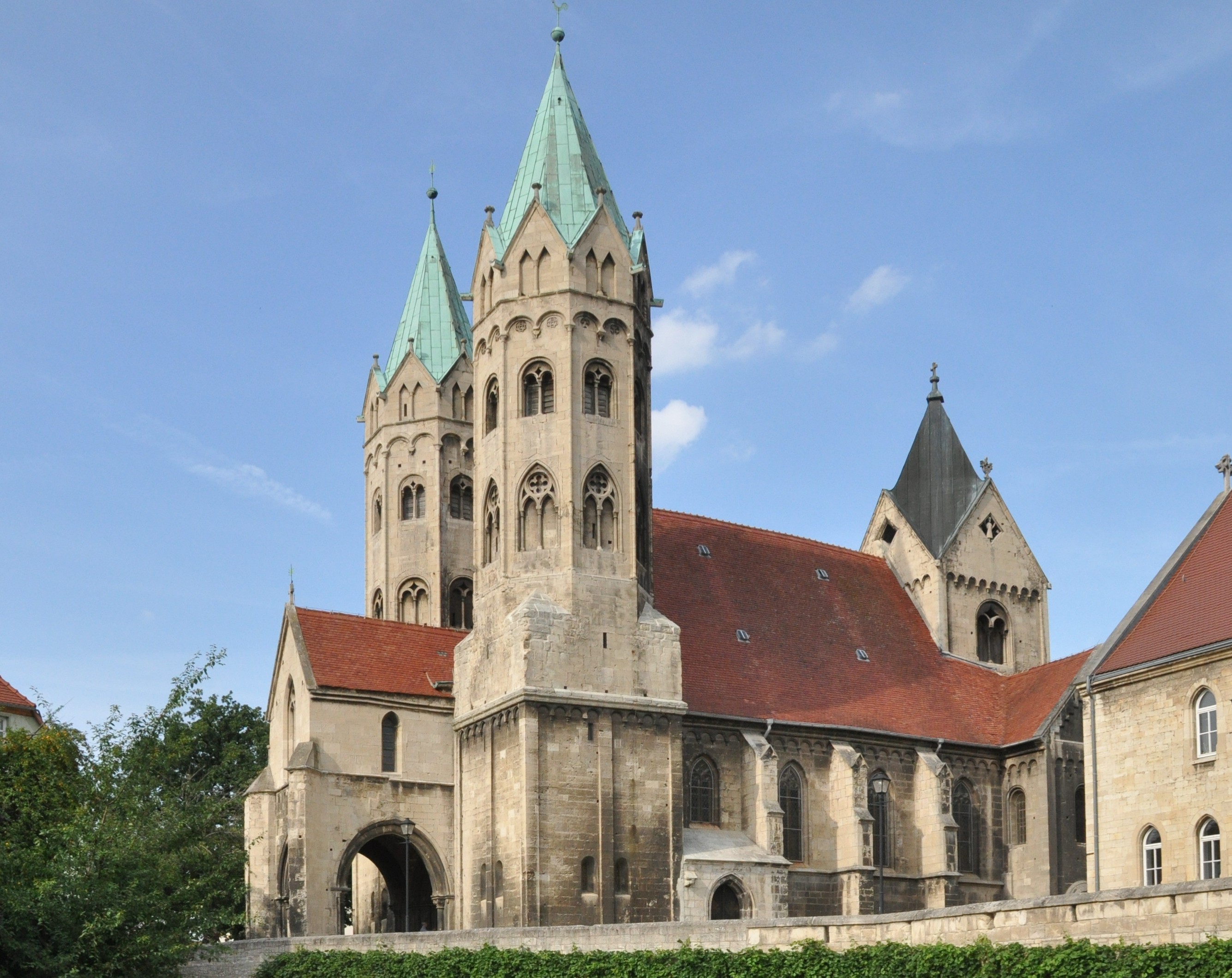

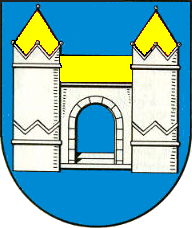
- Coat of arms

- Location of Freyburg within Burgenlandkreis district
- Interactive map of Freyburg
- Location within Germany Location within Saxony-Anhalt
- Coordinates: 51°12′46″N 11°46′11″E
- Country: Germany
- State: Saxony-Anhalt
- District: Burgenlandkreis
- Municipal assoc.: Unstruttal
- Subdivisions: 3

Government
  - Mayor (2022–29): Udo Mänicke

Area
  - Total: 46.55 km^{2} (17.97 sq mi)
- Elevation: 110 m (360 ft)

Population (2025-12-31)
  - Total: 4,399
  - Density: 94.50/km^{2} (244.8/sq mi)
- Time zone: UTC+01:00 (CET)
  - Summer (DST): UTC+02:00 (CEST)
- Postal codes: 06632
- Dialling codes: 034464
- Vehicle registration: BLK
- Website: www.freyburg-info.de

Freyburg (German pronunciation: [ˈfʁaɪbʊʁk]) is a town in the Burgenlandkreis district, in Saxony-Anhalt, Germany. It is situated on the river Unstrut, 9 km northwest of Hanseatic Naumburg, 63 km from Leipzig and 231 km from Berlin. It is part of the Verwaltungsgemeinschaft ("collective municipality") Unstruttal. On 1 July 2009 it absorbed the former municipalities Pödelist, Schleberoda, Weischütz and Zeuchfeld. Freyburg consists of the Ortsteile (divisions) Dobichau, Freyburg, Nißmitz, Pödelist, Schleberoda, Weischütz, Zeuchfeld and Zscheiplitz.

The town is a tourist destination, best known for its vineyards, historic town centre, superb 11th-century castle and associations with Friedrich Ludwig Jahn (founder of modern gymnastics). One of the most prosperous towns in the region, Freyburg is nicknamed "Tuscany of the North" It is the headquarters of one of the world's largest wine companies.

The town and the castle of Freyburg are part of the World Heritage designation "Naumburg Cathedral and the High Medieval Cultural Landscape of the Rivers Saale and Unstrut".

== History ==
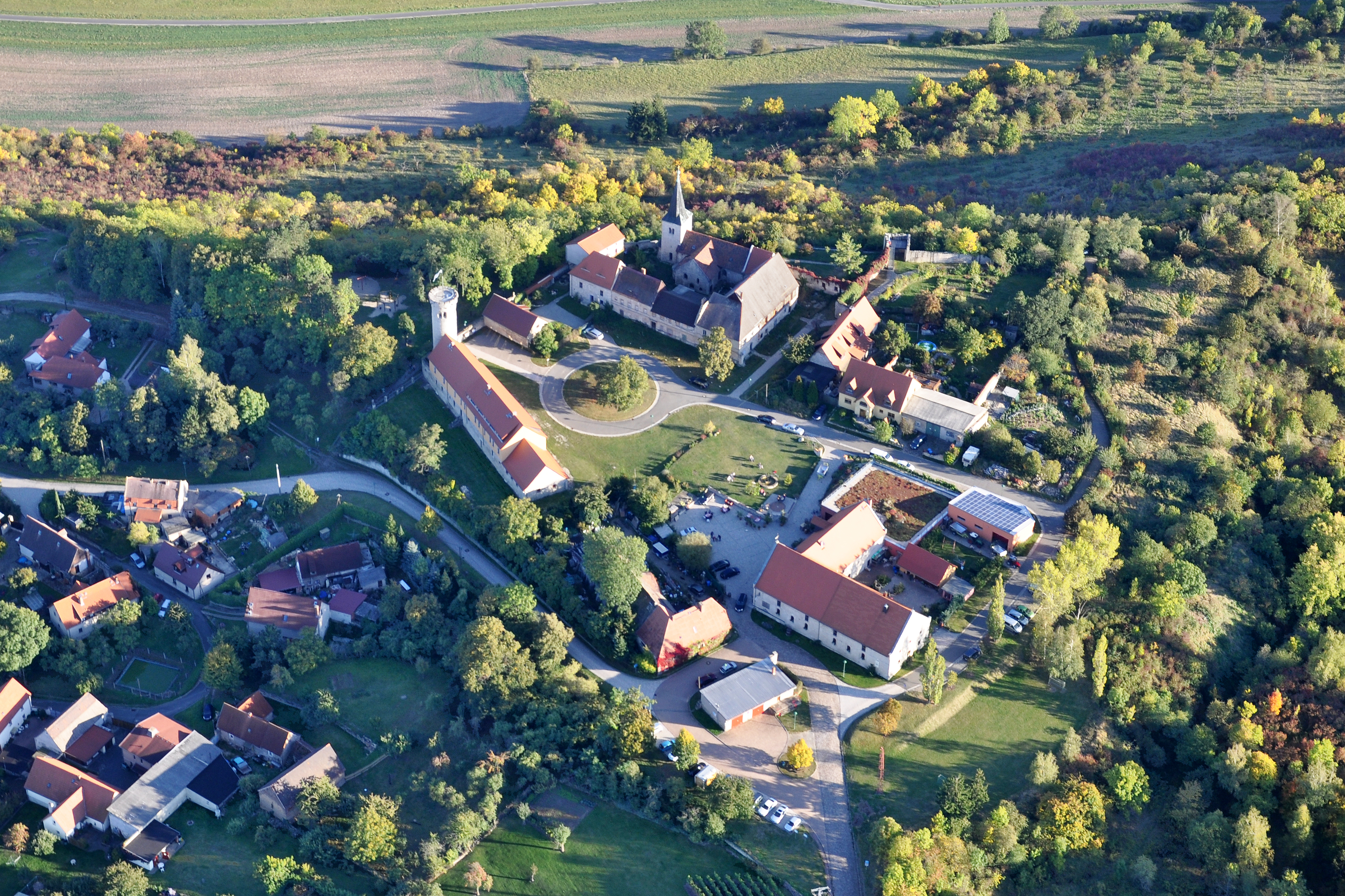
Zscheiplitz view

This part of the cultural landscape is closely associated with the powerful noble family of the Ludowings, who left their mark here from 1080 onwards. As counts palatine of Electorate of Saxony and landgraves of Thuringia they belonged to the highest ranks of nobility in the High Middle Ages.

=== Neuenburg ===
Neuenburg Castle, constructed between 1090 and 1220, is the most prominent monument to the family's rank and ambition. It remains one of the largest and most significant European castles from that period. It features a double chapel, a residence tower for the ducal family, an impressive castle keep „Dicker Wilhelm" and vast authentic wall and fortification structures, all dating back to this period.

The castle was built around 1090 by the Thuringian count Ludwig der Springer, securing his territory in the east, as did its sister castle Wartburg in the west. Situated in the border region, this fortified castle served military purposes and reflected ambitions, self-confidence and sophistication of the Ludowingians. Already in 1100, Neuenburg Castle was the most important fortification in central Germany and remained of outstanding political and military significance until the 13th century. The Neuenburg Castle was five times larger than Castle Wartburg and was built in the same style, with the latter being known as the most quintessential German castle due to its associations with Martin Luther and Johann Wolfgang von Goethe, and its role in the origination of the modern German flag.

The Neuenburg has also played a significant role over the centuries, hosting historical figures like King Henry I, Holy Roman Emperor Friedrich Barbarossa and the poet Heinrich von Veldeke. By the 13th century, the Neuenburg came under the control of members of the house of Wettin (now the royal family of England). Freyburg, thus, was part of the Electorate of Saxony until it was annexed by Prussia in the 19th century. Not surprisingly, Freyburg has been a strategic military prize throughout history and has been attacked by the Swedish army in the 17th century and the French army in the 19th century under Napoleon.

=== Old town of Freyburg ===
Map of Freyburg (c. 1750)

In the last quarter of the 12th, Herman I from the Ludovingian dynasty founded the town of Freyburg. The town was built at the food of Neuenburg Castle around a rectangular market place to meet the demands of the increased population, to provide the Neuenburg Castle with merchandise and to secure the passage and revenues of the Unstrut River. The landgraves of Thuringia controlled the road in the valley by erecting this fortified town. The determinative "frey" (free) referred to the royal freedom granted to it when it was founded and to the baronial privilege of a nearly royal rank, which primarily reveals the self-image of its rulers. In its midst the splendid early gothic church of St. Mary has been preserved, along with large parts of the authentic city walls and the layout of the market square and streets. It is an extraordinary example of planned cities in the High Middle Ages.

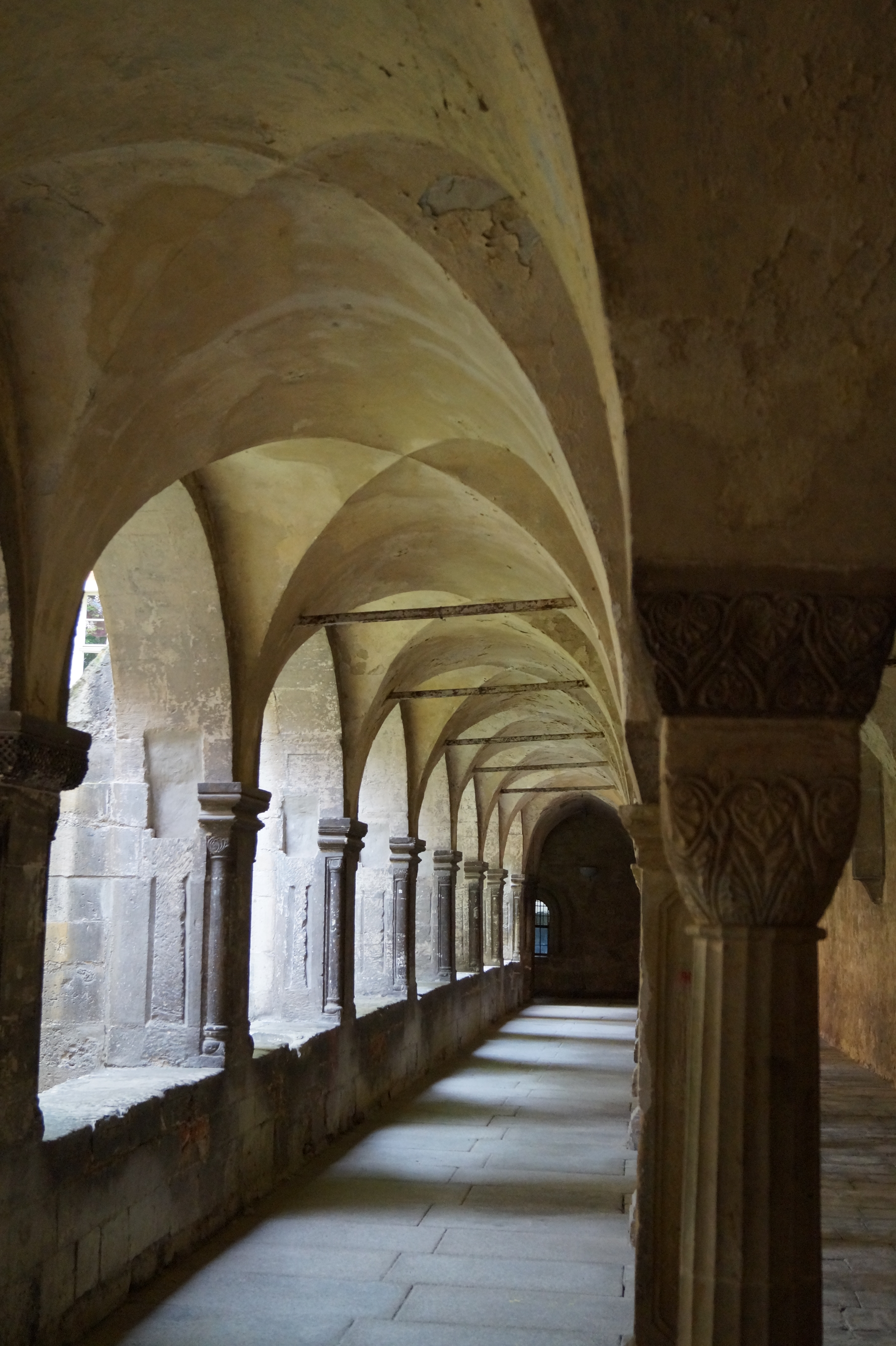
Monastery Pforta

Bordering on the city walls the terraced vineyards of the Schweigenberge is situated, which is in constant use since the High Middle Ages and still operated mainly by the local residents of Freyburg, most of whom run small vineyards for personal use, as has been the case here since medieval times.

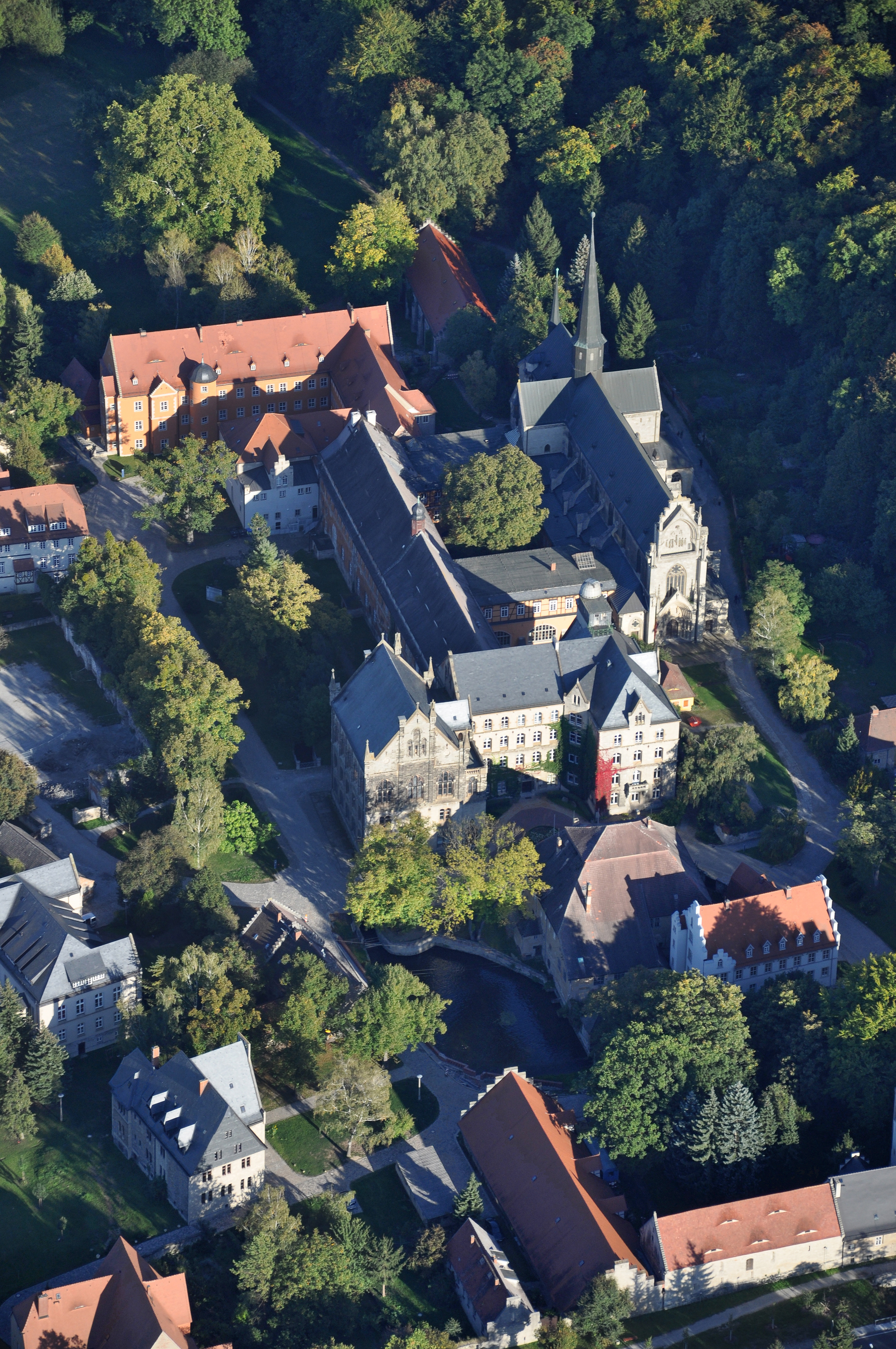
Pforta from air

=== Monastery of Zscheiplitz ===
The Ludowings also constructed the nearby Benedictine nun monastery of Zscheiplitz around 1200. The monastery church has preserved its authentic structure and decorum of the High Middle Ages. The line of sight along the Unstrut river from Zscheiplitz to the Schweigenberge on to Freyburg and to Neuenburg Castle remains unchanged and intact since the High Middle Ages.

Between 1825-1852, Freyburg was the home in exile to 18th century gymnastics educator Friedrich Ludwig Jahn. He was widely regarded as the founder of modern gymnastics and left behind the world's first gymnasium in Freyburg. He is buried in Freyburg and his memorial in the town has become a pilgrimage site for gymnasts such as Olympic champion Klaus Koeste and world champion Erika Zuchold.

== World Heritage Nomination ==
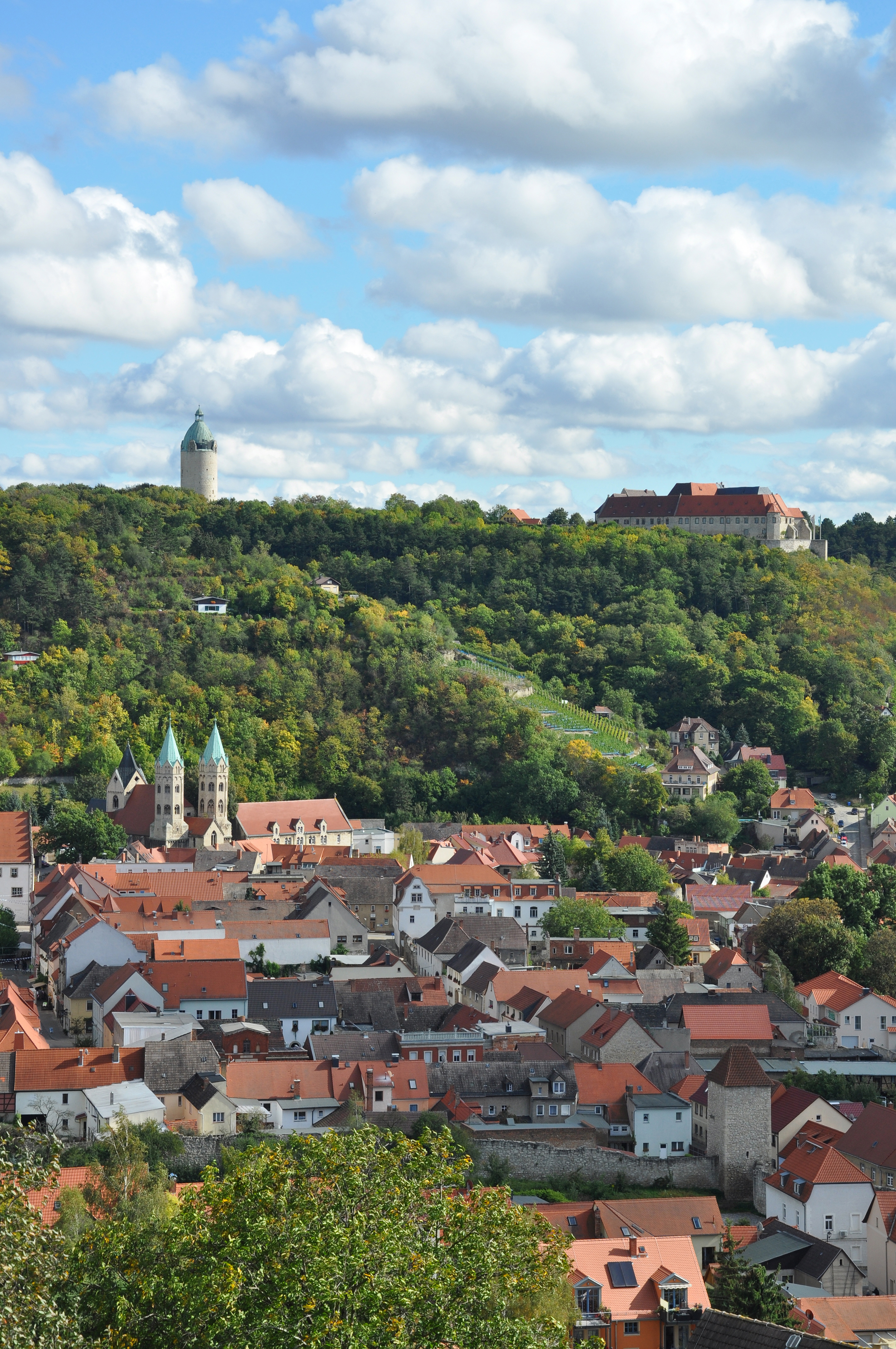
Neuenburg view from Freyburg

Freyburg is one of the eleven components of the cultural landscape Naumburg Cathedral and the High Medieval Cultural Landscape of the Rivers Saale and Unstrut that has been proposed by the Federal Republic of Germany for inscription in the List of World Heritage. It is composed of Neuenburg Castle, the old town of Freyburg, its Schweigenberg vineyard, as well as Zscheiplitz Monastery and is located in the municipality of Schönburg 4.5 kilometers east of Naumburg at the heart of Federal Republic of Germany in the State of Saxony-Anhalt.

The World Heritage nomination is representative for the processes that shaped the continent during the High Middle Ages between 1000 and 1300: Christianization, the so-called "Landesausbau" and the dynamics of cultural exchange and transfer characteristic for this very period.

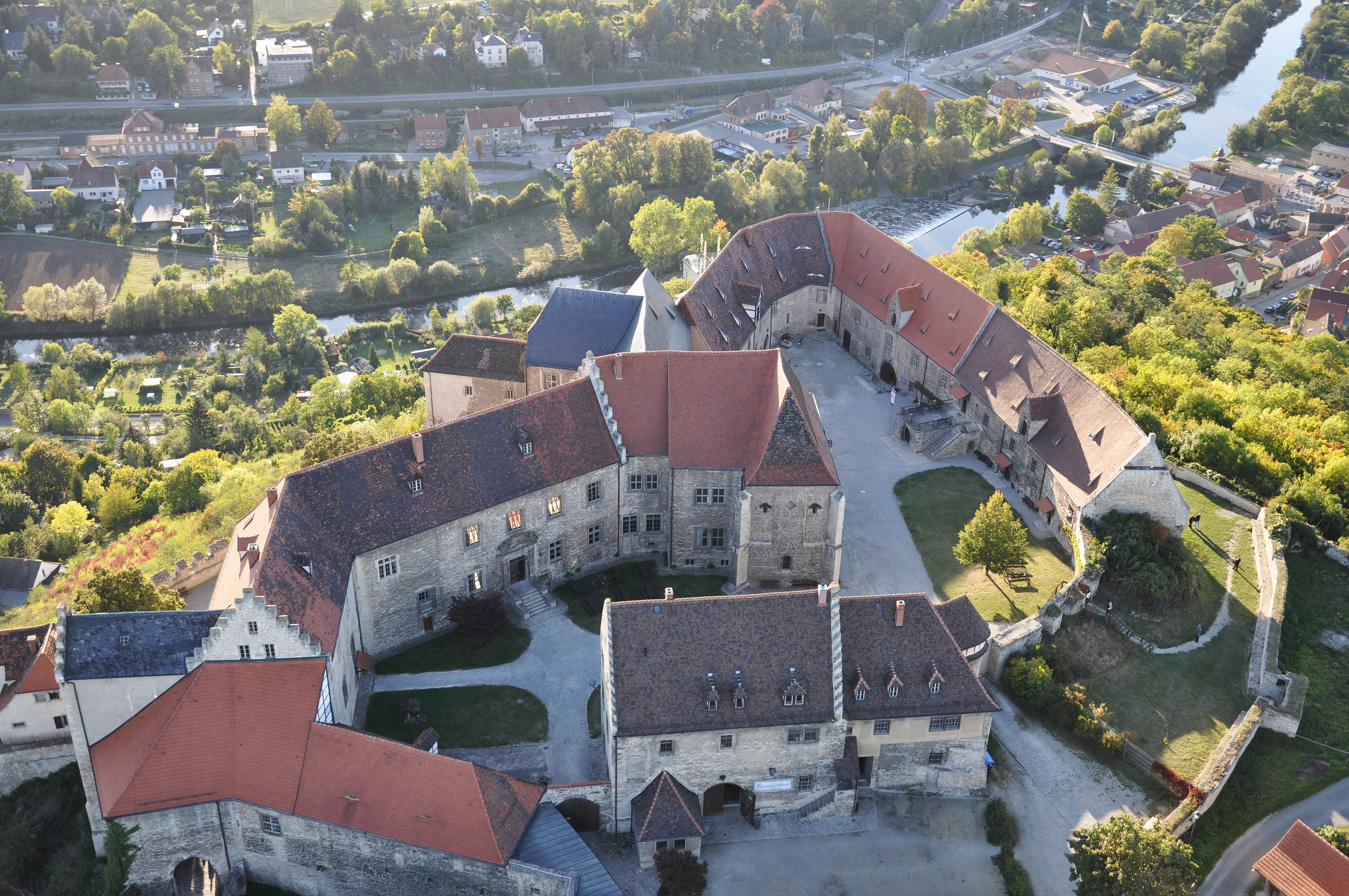
Neuenburg view

== Wine ==
Freyburg is the northernmost wine growing region in Germany and Europe and has a wine festival called the "Winzerfest" every year in September. One of the oldest wine growing regions in Europe, the Freyburg region has more than a thousand years of documented wine growing history.

Despite having barely 700 hectares of vineyards under cultivation, the town is the headquarters of one of the world's largest wine companies - Rotkäppchen-Mumm. The winery was founded in 1856, and by 2010, captured nearly half the market for sparkling wine in Germany and has a reported turnover of more than US$1 billion (780 million euros). This Freyburg-based producer is one of the five largest producers of sparkling wine in the world, along with Spanish producer Freixenet (headquartered near Barcelona) and French producer Moët Hennessy Louis Vuitton (headquartered in Paris).

There are also other smaller wine producers in the region. Wine critics have pointed out that while there were not that many great wines from the Freyburg area, there were also very few poorly made wines. Quality across vineyards tend to be fairly consistent, ranging from average to very good.

Freyburg can grow wine commercially unlike other regions of similar latitudes in Europe is based on the high concentration of heat-retaining calcium in the soil and a micro-climate that make it significantly warmer than nearby Berlin and Leipzig. The river Unstrut runs through it, and is home to large pike, trout, carp and beavers. In the hills surrounding the town, there are deer, wild boar, pheasant and fox. There are many working farms scattered around the region, offering a wide range of fresh and organic produce.

== Personalities ==
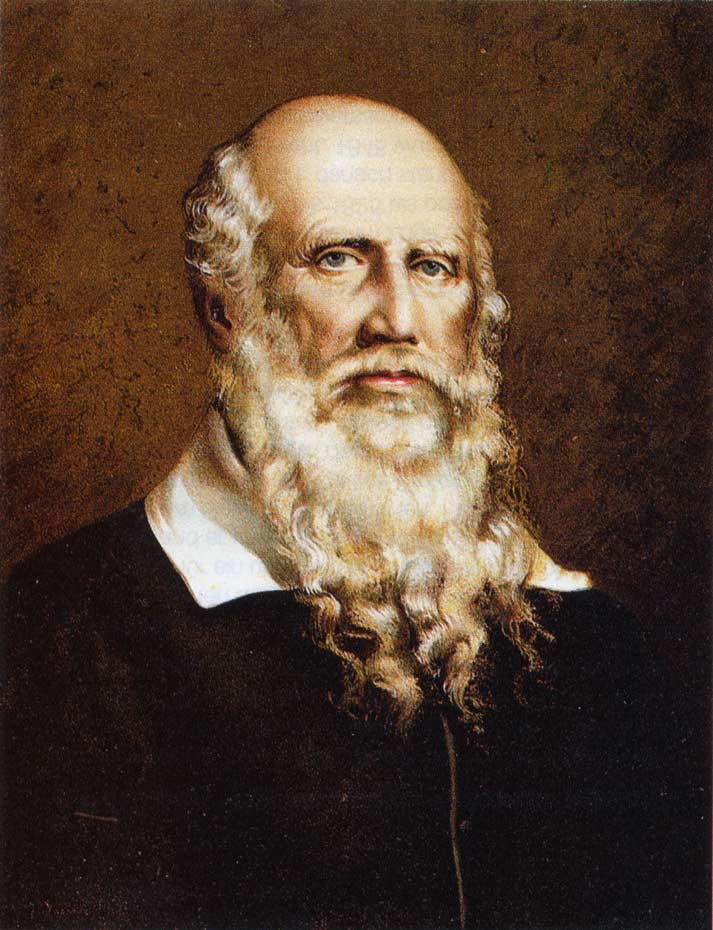
Friedrich Ludwig Jahn

=== Sons and daughters of the city ===
- Robert Hermann Schomburgk (1804-1865), natural scientist
- Moritz Richard Schomburgk (1811-1891), botanist and research traveler
- Felix Hoppe-Seyler (1825-1895), chemist and physiologist
- Ernst Neufert (1900-1986), architect, author

=== Personalities who have worked on the ground ===
- Friedrich Ludwig Jahn, (1778-1852), gymnastics educator, Turnvater Jahn

== See also ==
- Weischütz
