= List of castles in Saxony-Anhalt =

Numerous castles and palaces (schloss) are found in the German state of Saxony-Anhalt. These buildings, some of which have a history of over 1000 years, were the setting of historical events, domains of famous personalities and are still imposing buildings to this day.

This list encompasses castles described in German as Burg (castle or manor house), Festung (fort/fortress), Schloß (manor house, castle or palace) and Palais/Palast (palace). Many German Schlösser after the Middle Ages were mainly built as royal or ducal palaces rather than as a fortified building.

== Dessau-Roßlau ==
1. Georgium Castle
2. Gotihic House
3. Grokühnau Castle
4. Haideburg Hunting Lodge
5. Johannbau
6. Luisium Castle
7. Mosigkau Castle
8. Roßlau Castle

== Halle (Saale) ==
1. Giebichenstein Castle
2. Moritzburg
3. Neue Residenz

== Magdeburg ==
1. Magdeburg Fortress
  1. Fort I
  2. Fort Berge
  3. Turmschanze
  4. Magdeburg Citadel
  5. Zwischenwerk VIII a
2. Randau Castle

== Altmarkkreis Salzwedel ==
1. Apenburg Castle, Apenburg
2. Beetzendorf Castle, Beetzendorf
3. Gardelegen Castle, Gardelegen
4. Weteritz Castle, Gardelegen
5. Kalbe Castle, Kalbe (Milde)
6. Kläden Castle, Kläden
7. Klötze Castle, Klötze
8. Kunrau Castle, Kunrau
9. Letzlingen Hunting Lodge, Letzlingen
10. Salzwedel Castle, Salzwedel
11. Tylsen Castle, Tylsen

== Anhalt-Bitterfeld ==
1. Altjeßnitz Castle, Altjeßnitz
2. Castlekemmnitz Castle, Castlekemnitz
3. Gröbzig Castle, Gröbzig
4. Großpaschleben Castle, Großpaschleben
5. Geuz Castle, Köthen (Anhalt)
6. Schloss Köthen, Köthen (Anhalt)
7. Lindau Castle, Lindau
8. Bärenthoren Castle, Polenzko
9. Pouch Castle, Pouch
10. Reinsdorf Castle, Reinsdorf (Südliches Anhalt)
11. Walternienburg Castle, Walternienburg
12. Gölzau Castle, Weißandt-Gölzau
13. Zerbst Palace, Zerbst / Anhalt
14. Zerbst Castle, Zerbst / Anhalt
15. Quetz Castle, Zörbig
16. Zörbig Castle, Zörbig

== Börde ==
1. Altenhausen Castle, Altenhausen
2. Angern Water Castle, Angern
3. Trautenburg Castle, Ausleben
4. Bartensleben Castle, Bartensleben
5. Veltheimsburg Castle, Bebertal
6. Calvörde Castle, Calvörde
7. Dreileben Castle, Dreileben
8. Eggenstedt Castle, Eggenstedt
9. Eichenbarleben Castle, Eichenbarleben
10. Erxleben Castle, Erxleben
11. Flechtingen water Castle, Flechtingen
12. Hasselburg Hunting Lodge, Flechtingen
13. Gröningen Castle, Gröningen
14. Krottorf Castle, Gröningen
15. Bergen Manor House, Groß Rodensleben
16. Detzel Castle, Haldensleben
17. Hundisburg Castle, Haldensleben
18. Harbke Castle, Harbke
19. Hötensleben Castle, Hötensleben
20. Asseburgisches Castle, Hornhausen
21. Ramstedt Castle, Loitsche
22. Oebisfelde Castle, Oebisfelde
23. Ampfurth Castle, Oschersleben (Bode)
24. Groß Germersleben Castle, Oschersleben (Bode)
25. Hadmersleben Castle, Oschersleben (Bode)
26. Klein Oschersleben Castle, Oschersleben (Bode)
27. Neindorf Castle, Oschersleben (Bode)
28. Oschersleben Castle, Oschersleben (Bode)
29. Peseckendorf Castle, Peseckendorf
30. Heinrichshorst Hunting Lodge, Rogätz
31. Klutturm Rogätz, Rogätz
32. Klein Santersleben Castle, Schackensleben
33. Seggerde Castle, Seggerde
34. Sommerschenburg Castle, Sommersdorf
35. Bahrendorf Castle, Sülzetal
36. Bodendorf Castle, Süplingen
37. Ummendorf Castle, Ummendorf
38. Walbeck Castle, Walbeck
39. Wanzleben Castle, Wanzleben
40. Weferlingen Marsh Castle, Weferlingen
41. Wolmirstedt Castle, Wolmirstedt

== Burgenlandkreis ==
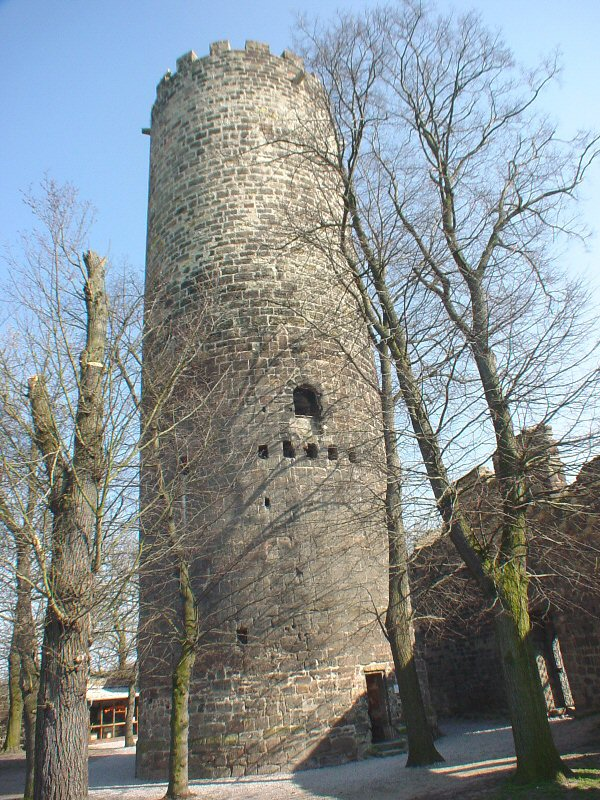
Schönburg Castle

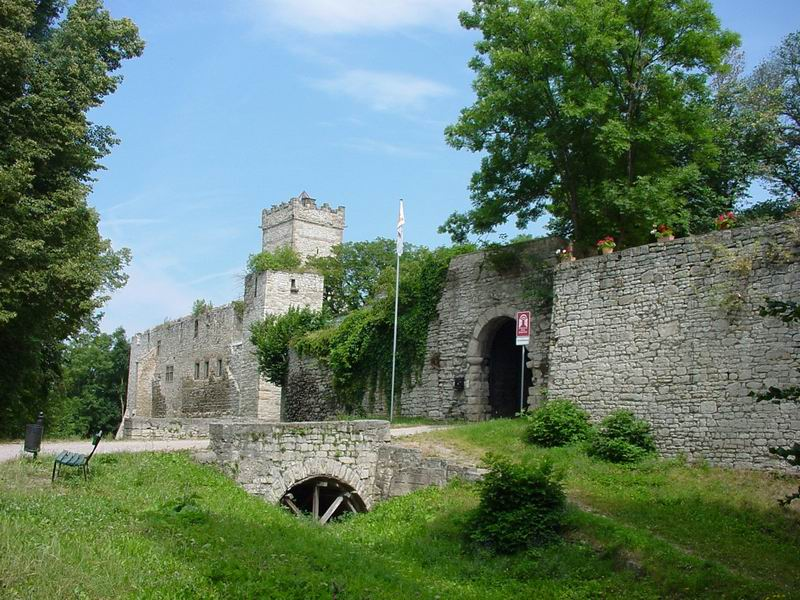
Eckartsburg

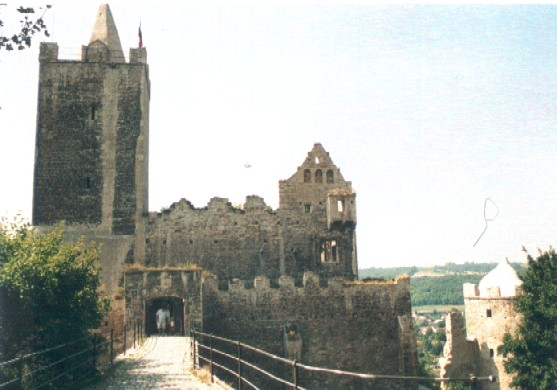
Rudelsburg

1. Rudelsburg, Bad Kösen
2. Saaleck Castle, Bad Kösen
3. Breitenbach Castle, Breitenbach
4. Kempe Breitenbach, Breitenbach
5. Bucha Castle, Bucha
6. Burgscheidungen Castle, Burgscheidungen
7. Castlewerben Castle, Castlewerben
8. Droyßig Castle, Droyßig
9. Eckartsburg, Eckartsberga
10. Marienthal Castle, Eckartsberga
11. Etzoldshain Castle, Elsteraue
12. Zscheiplitz Castle, Freyburg
13. Neuenburg Castle (Freyburg)
14. Fronfeste Gleina, Gleina
15. Gleina Castle, Gleina
16. Goseck Castle, Goseck
17. Haynsburg, Haynsburg
18. Heuckewalde Water Castle, Heuckewalde
19. Klosterhäseler Castle, Klosterhäseler
20. Lützen Castle, Lützen
21. Imperial Palace of Memleben, Memleben
22. Wendelstein Castle, Memleben
23. Naumburg Residenz, Naumburg (Saale)
24. Nebra Castle, Nebra (Unstrut)
25. Nebra Castle, Nebra (Unstrut)
26. Osterfeld Castle, Osterfeld
27. Reinsdorf Castle, Reinsdorf
28. Schönburg Castle, Schönburg
29. Steinburg Castle, Steinburg
30. Bonau Castle, Teuchern
31. Trebnitz Castle, Trebnitz
32. Neu-Augustusburg Castle, Weißenfels
33. Moritzburg Castle, Zeitz
34. Zscheiplitz Castle, Zscheiplitz

== Harz ==
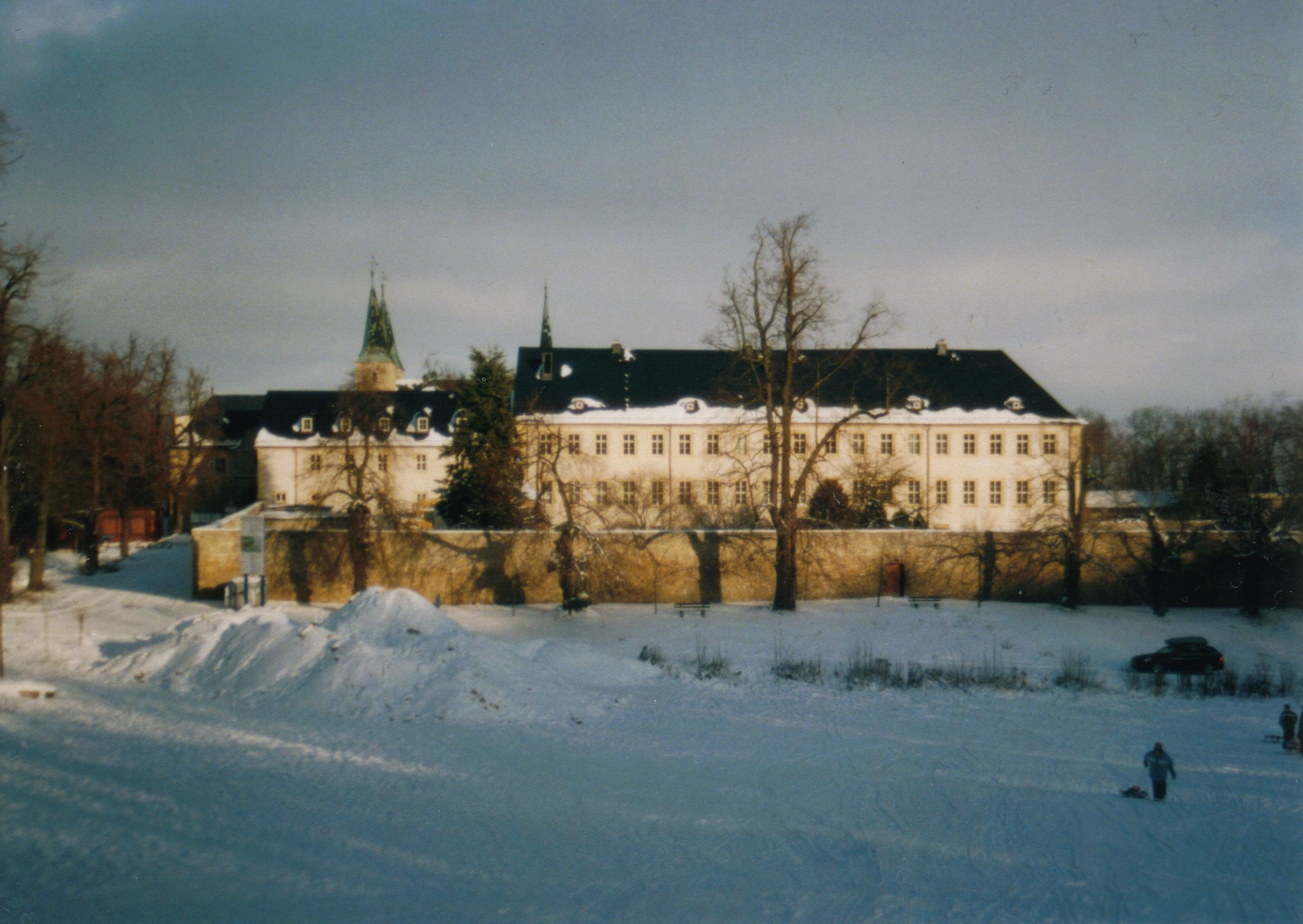
Huysburg

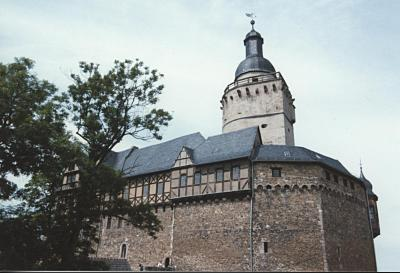
Falkenstein Castle

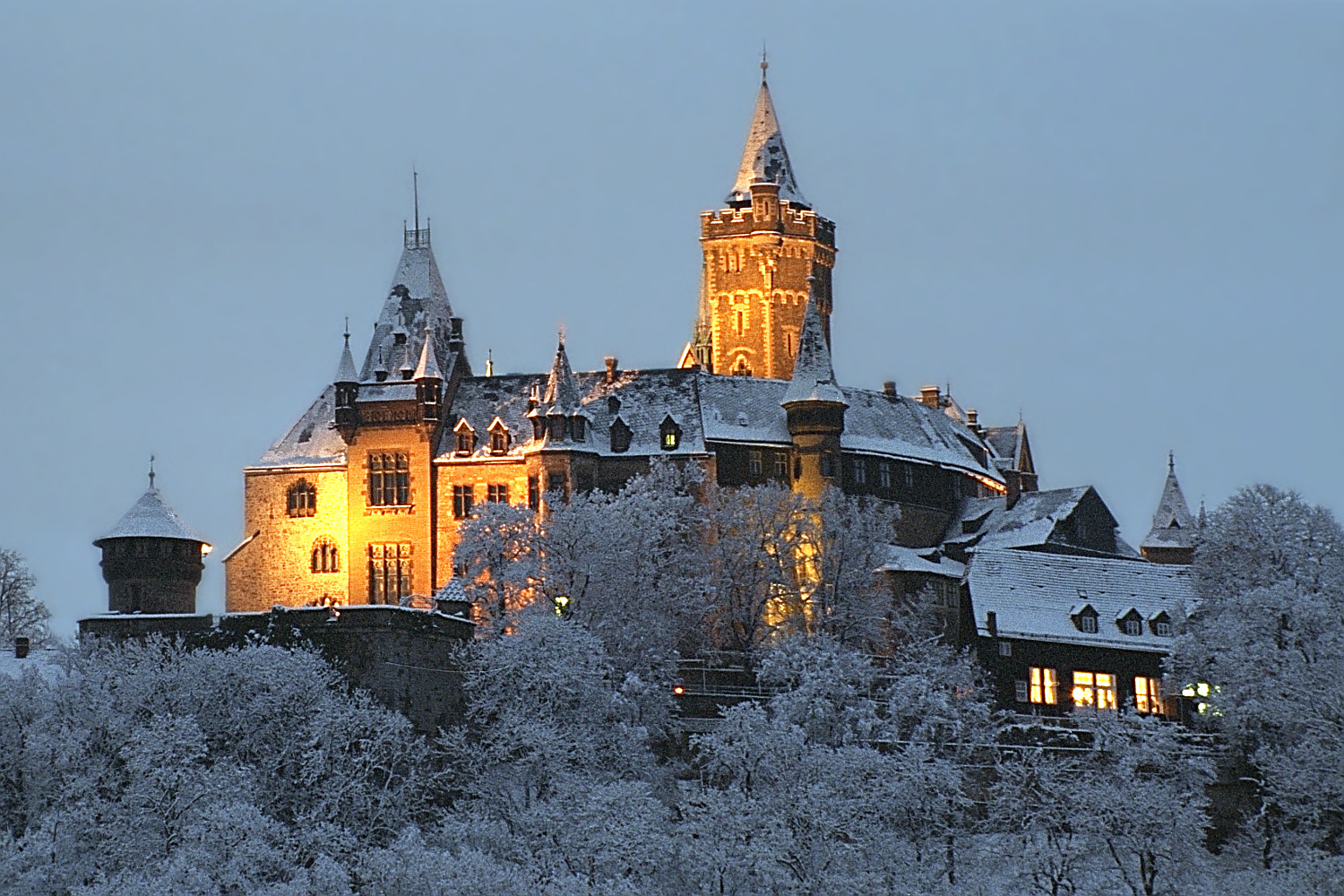
Wernigerode Castle

1. Windenhütte Hunting Lodge, Altenbrak
2. Hessen Castle, Hessen (Osterwieck)
3. Zilly Castle, Aue-Fallstein
4. Oberhof Ballenstedt, Ballenstedt
5. Ballenstedt Castle, Ballenstedt
6. Regenstein Castle, Blankenburg (Harz)
7. Great Castle Blankenburg, Blankenburg (Harz)
8. Little Castle Blankenburg, Blankenburg (Harz)
9. Luisenburg, Blankenburg (Harz)
10. Königsburg Ruins, Elbingerode (Harz)
11. Ackeburg, Falkenstein / Harz
12. Falkenstein Castle (Harz), Falkenstein / Harz
13. Old Falkenstein Castle, Falkenstein / Harz
14. Meisdorf Baroque Palace, Falkenstein / Harz
15. Erichsberg Castle near Friedrichsbrunn
16. Heinrichsburg near Gernrode
17. Güntersburg, near Güntersberge, ruin
18. Emersleben Castle, Halberstadt
19. Spiegelsberge Hunting Lodge, Halberstadt
20. Hasserode Castle, Hasserode, site
21. Anhalt Castle, Harzgerode, ruins
22. Harzgerode Castle, Harzgerode
23. Heinrichsberg Castle, Harzgerode, ruins
24. Hausneindorf Castle, Hausneindorf
25. Heimburg Castle, Heimburg
26. Domburg im Hakel, Heteborn
27. Huysburg, Huy
28. Röderhof Castle, Huy
29. Schlanstedt Castle, Huy
30. Westerburg Castle, Huy
31. Ilsenburg House, Ilsenburg
32. Langenstein Castle, Langenstein
33. Gersdorf Castle, Quedlinburg
34. Quedlinburg Castle, Quedlinburg
35. Roseburg near Rieder
36. Ahlsburg, Stapelburg
37. Stapelburg Castle, Stapelburg
38. Lauenburg, Stecklenberg
39. Stecklenburg, Stecklenberg
40. Stiege Hunting Lodge, Stiege
41. Wendhausen Tower, Thale
42. Minsleben Castle, Wernigerode
43. Struvenburg, Wernigerode
44. Wernigerode Castle, Wernigerode

== Jerichower Land ==
1. Zerben Castle, Elbe-Parey
2. Parchen Castle, Genthin
3. Dretzel Castle, Gladau
4. Dornburg Castle, Gommern
5. Gommern Castle, Gommern
6. Leitzkau Castle, Gommern
7. Grabow Castle, Grabow
8. Kade Little Castle, Kade
9. Karow Castle, Karow
10. Königsborn Castle, Königsborn
11. Brandenstein Castle, Krüssau
12. Loburg Castle, Loburg
13. Lüttgenziatz Castle, Möckern
14. Möckern Castle, Möckern
15. Stegelitz Castle, Möckern
16. Wendgräben Castle, Möckern
17. Pietzpuhl Castle, Pietzpuhl
18. Schlagenthin Castle, Schlagenthin
19. Ringelsdorf Castle, Tucheim
20. Tucheim Castle, Tucheim
21. Waldrogäsen Castle, Wüstenjerichow
22. Wüstenjerichow Castle, Wüstenjerichow
23. Zabakuck Castle, Zabakuck

== Mansfeld-Südharz ==
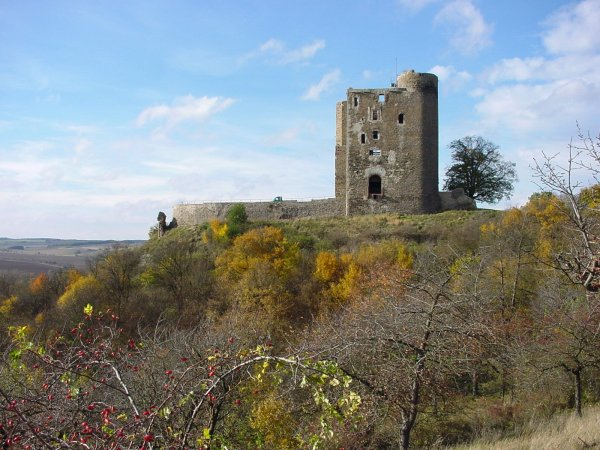
Arnstein Castle

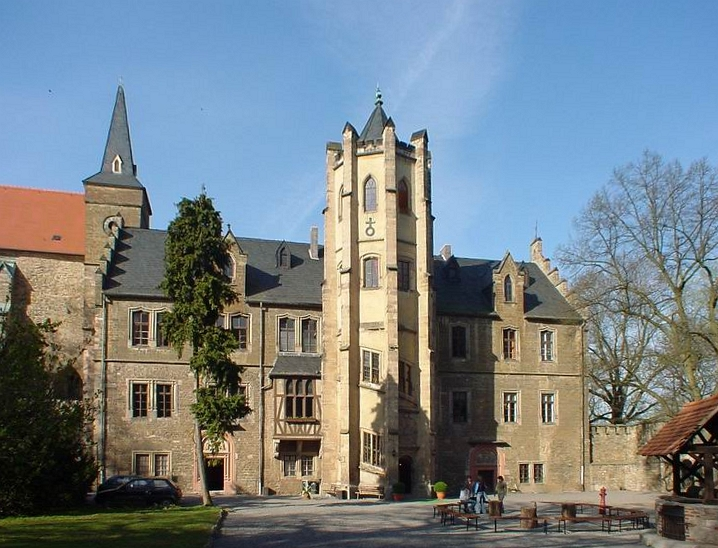
Mansfeld Castle

1. Allstedt Castle, Allstedt
2. Beyernaumburg Castle, Beyernaumburg
3. Bornstedt Castle, Bornstedt
4. Schwiederschwende Hunting Lodge, Breitungen
5. Hinterort Castle, Eisleben
6. Mittelort Castle, Eisleben
7. Vorderort Castle, Eisleben
8. Friedeburg Castle, Friedeburg (Saale)
9. Rammelburg Castle, Friesdorf
10. Arnstein Castle, Harkerode
11. Burgörner Castle, Hettstedt
12. Hettstedt Castle, Hettstedt
13. Mansfeld Castle, Mansfeld
14. Trutz Mansfeld Castle, Mansfeld
15. Neu-Asseburg Castle, Mansfeld
16. Quenstedt Castle, Quenstedt
17. Questenberg Castle, Questenberg
18. Roßla Castle, Roßla
19. Grasburg, Rottleberode
20. Sandersleben Castle, Sandersleben (Anhalt)
21. Oberröblingen Castle, Sangerhausen
22. Grillenburg, Sangerhausen
23. Alt-Morungen Castle, Sangerhausen
24. Neu-Morungen Castle, Sangerhausen
25. Old Castle, Sangerhausen, Sangerhausen
26. New Castle, Sangerhausen, Sangerhausen
27. Seeburg Castle, Seeburg
28. Stolberg Castle, Stolberg (Harz)
29. Tilleda Imperial Palace, Tilleda
30. Wallhausen Castle, Wallhausen
31. Oberwiederstedt Castle, Wiederstedt
32. Wippra Castle, Wippra
33. Wolfsberg Castle, Wolfsberg, Sangerhausen

== Saalekreis ==
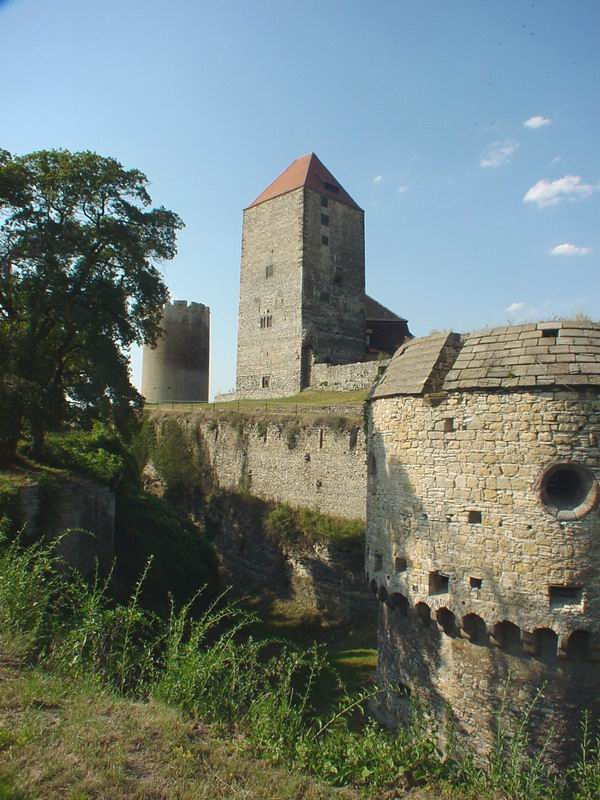
Castle Querfurt

1. Bad Lauchstädt Castle, Bad Lauchstädt
2. Beesenstedt Castle, Beesenstedt
3. Bedra Castle, Braunsbedra
4. Frankleben Castle, Braunsbedra
5. Hohenturm Castle, Hohenthurm
6. Dieskau Castle, Kabelsketal
7. Krosigk Castle, Krosigk
8. Landsberg Castle, Landsberg
9. Merseburg Castle, Merseburg
10. Zech’sches Palace, Merseburg
11. Sankt Ulrich Castle, Mücheln (Geiseltal)
12. Ostrau Castle, Ostrau
13. Lodersleben Castle, Querfurt
14. Querfurt Castle, Querfurt
15. Vitzenburg Castle, Querfurt
16. Zingst Castle, Querfurt
17. Rothenburg Castle, Rothenburg
18. Schafstädt Castle, Schafstädt
19. Castleliebenau Castle, Schkopau
20. Bündorf Castle, Schkopau
21. Schkopau Castle, Schkopau
22. Schochwitz Castle, Schochwitz
23. Schraplau Castle, Schraplau
24. Beuchlitz Castle, Teutschenthal
25. Teutschenthal Castle, Teutschenthal
26. Wettin Castle, Wettin
27. Dölkau Castle, Zweimen

== Salzlandkreis ==
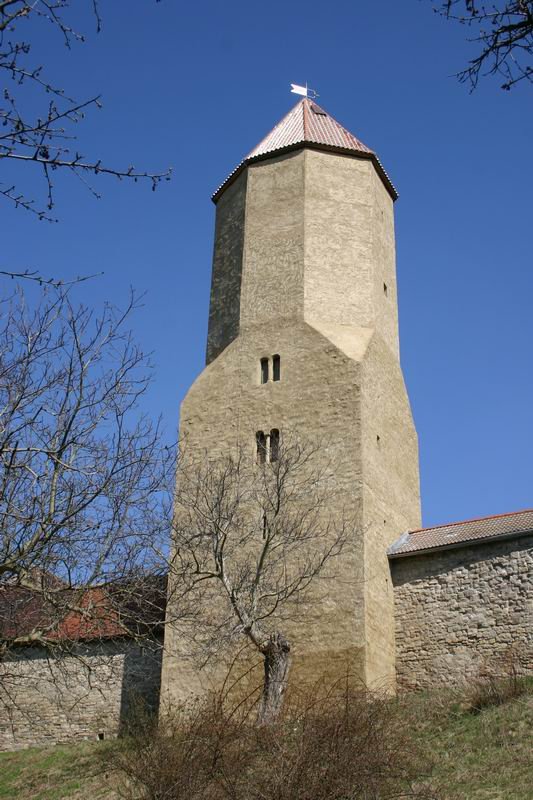
Freckleben Castle

1. Alsleben Castle, Alsleben (Saale)
2. Warmsdorf Castle, Amesdorf
3. Aschersleben Castle, Aschersleben
4. Wilsleben Castle, Aschersleben
5. Barby Castle, Barby (Elbe)
6. Bernburg Castle, Bernburg (Saale)
7. Biendorf Castle, Biendorf
8. Egeln Castle, Egeln
9. Konradsburg, Ermsleben
10. Ermsleben Castle, Ermsleben
11. Freckleben Castle, Freckleben
12. Gatersleben Castle, Gatersleben
13. Gröna Castle, Gröna
14. Großmühlingen Renaissance Castle, Großmühlingen
15. Klein Rosenburg Castle, Groß Rosenburg
16. Gänsefurth Castle, Hecklingen
17. Hecklingen Castle, Hecklingen
18. Castle Schneidlingen, Hecklingen
19. Hoym Princes‘ House, Hoym
20. Hoym Castle, Hoym
21. Piesdorf Castle, Könnern
22. Poplitz Castle, Könnern
23. Haus Zeitz, Könnern
24. Neugattersleben Castle, Neugattersleben
25. Nienburg Castle, Nienburg (Saale), burnt down in 1996
26. Plötzkau Castle, Plötzkau
27. Schadeleben Castle, Schönebeck (Elbe)
28. Hohenerxleben Castle, Staßfurt
29. Rathmannsdorf Castle, Staßfurt
30. Unseburg Lowland Castle, Unseburg

== Stendal ==
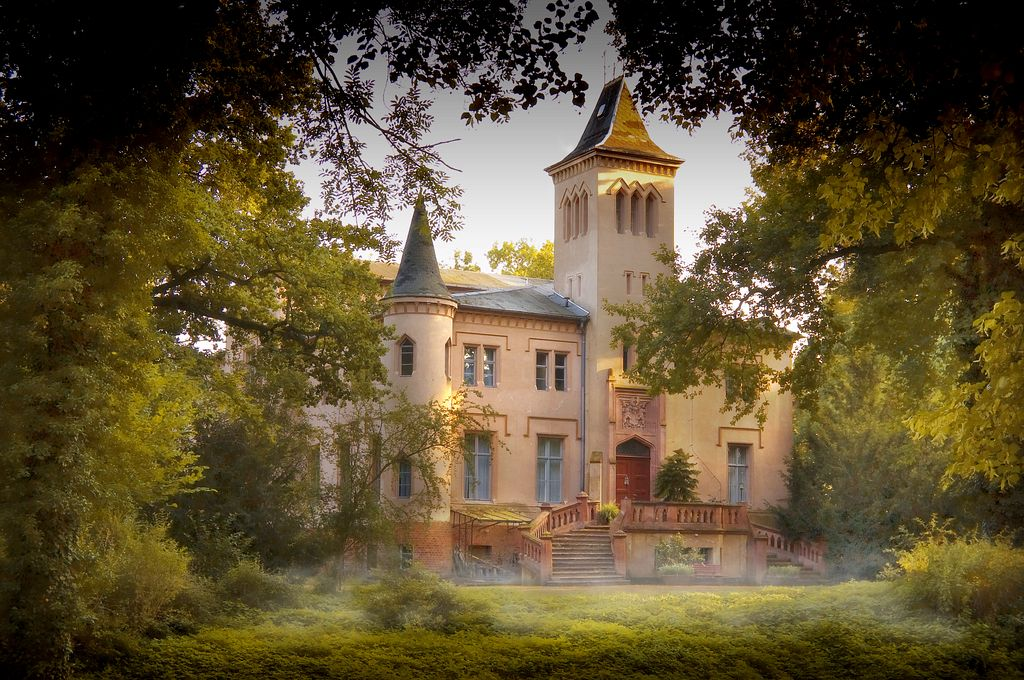
Krumke Castle

1. Badingen Castle, Badingen
2. Calberwisch Castle, Düsedau
3. Döbbelin Castle, Insel
4. Hohenkamern Castle, Kamern
5. Krevese Castle, Krevese
6. Groß Schwarzlosen Castle, Lüderitz
7. Möringen Castle, Möringen
8. Krumke Castle, Osterburg (Altmark)
9. Sandau Castle, Sandau (Elbe)
10. Schönfeld Castle, Schönfeld
11. Schönhausen Castle, Schönhausen (Elbe)
12. Castle Mahlitz, Schollene
13. Schollene Castle, Schollene
14. Storkau Castle, Storkau (Elbe)
15. Old Castle, Tangerhütte, Tangerhütte
16. New Castle, Tangerhütte, Tangerhütte
17. Tangermünde Castle, Tangermünde
18. Vinzelberg Castle, Vinzelberg
19. Vollenschier Castle, Wittenmoor
20. Wust Castle, Wust

== Wittenberg ==
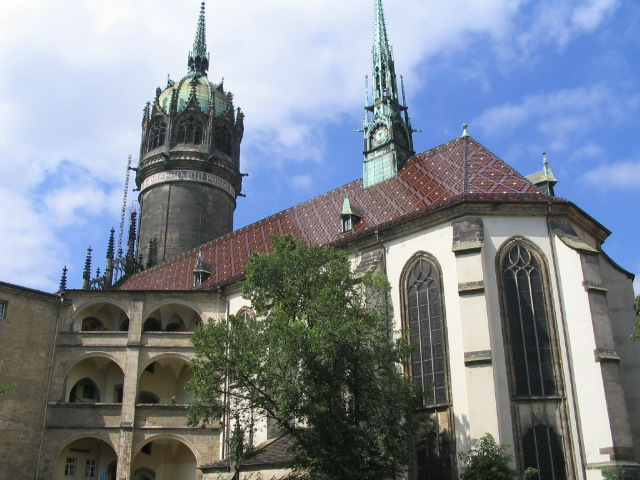
Castle and Church Wittenberg

1. Hunting Lodge Annaburg, Annaburg
2. Reinharz Hunting Lodge, Bad Schmiedeberg
3. Coswig Castle, Coswig (Anhalt)
4. Hundeluft Castle, Hundeluft
5. Jessen Castle, Jessen (Elster)
6. Klöden Castle, Klöden
7. Kropstädt Castle, Kropstädt
8. Oranienbaum Castle, Oranienbaum
9. Lichtenburg Castle, Prettin
10. Castle Pretzsch, Pretzsch
11. Radis Castle, Radis
12. Trebitz Castle, Trebitz
13. Wartenburg Castle, Wartenburg
14. Nudersdorf Castle, Lutherstadt Wittenberg
15. Castle Wittenberg, Lutherstadt Wittenberg
16. Domäne Wörlitz, Wörlitz
17. Wörlitz Castle, Wörlitz

== Literature ==
- Wilhelm van Kempen: Schlösser und Herrensitze in Provinz Sachsen und in Anhalt. Frankfurt/M.: Weidlich 1961. (Castleen, Schlösser, Herrensitze, Bd. 19)
- Corinna Köhlert, Jürgen Blume, Von Schlössern und Castleen in Sachsen-Anhalt. Halle (Saale) 2000, ISBN 978-3-89812-058-6

== See also ==
- List of castles
- List of castles in Germany
