= Wust =

Wust may refer to:

- Wust, Saxony-Anhalt, a village in the district of Stendal, Saxony-Anhalt, Germany
- Wust-Fischbeck, a municipality in the district of Stendal, Saxony-Anhalt, Germany
- WUST, a radio station broadcasting in Washington, DC
- Wüst or Wuest, a surname
