= Philipp von Mansfeld =

German noble, commander in the Thirty Years War (1589 - 1657)

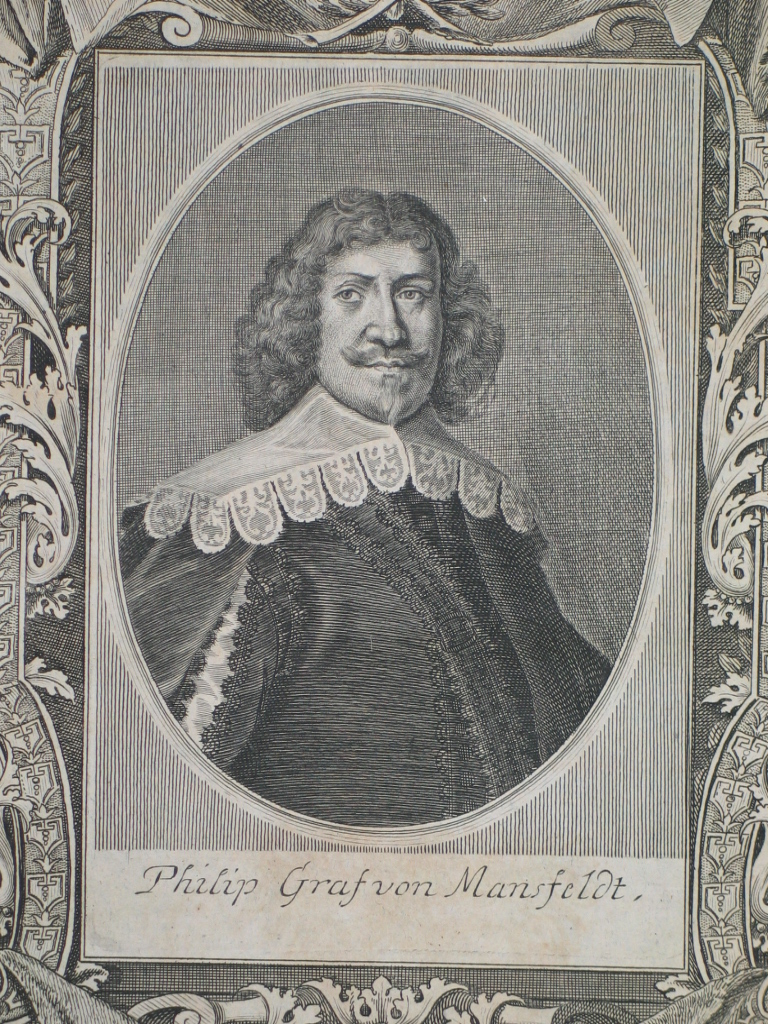
Philipp von Mansfeld

Philipp von Mansfeld (1589 - 8 April 1657), was Graf von (Count of) Mansfeld, Vorderort and Bornstedt who commanded troops during the Thirty Years' War. He first fought on the side of the Swedish Empire under his second cousin, was captured, changed allegiance and raised a navy for General Albrecht von Wallenstein. Later, he commanded troops as Generalfeldmarschall of the Holy Roman Empire.

== Family ==
Mansfeld was born in 1589, the son of Bruno, Count of Mansfeld-Vorderort and his wife, Christine of Barby and Mühlingen.

In 1611 Mansfeld married Maria von Mansfeld-Hinterort and they had six children:

- Anna Caroline von Mansfeld-Vorderort who married Franz von Gallas and later Karl Heinrich von Zierotin
- Georg Albert von Mansfeld-Vorderort who married Barbara Magdalena von Mansfeld-Hinterort and inherited his father's titles.
- Susanne Polyxena Catharina von Mansfeld-Vorderort who married Matyás Arnost Berchtold de Uhercic and later Julius Leopold, Count of Hoditz and Wolframitz (Note: Their descendant Joseph Albert married Sophie, daughter of Johann Adolf I, Duke of Saxe-Weissenfels)
- Franziska Margarethe von Mansfeld-Vorderort who married Friedrich von Zedlitz
- Maria Clara von Mansfeld-Vorderort
- Ferdinand von Mansfeld-Vorderort

Upon her death, Mansfeld married, in 1630, Margaretha Catharine von Lobkowicz but had no further children.

== Military career ==
Mansfeld first served under Ernst von Mansfeld and the Swedish Empire during the Thirty Years' War. The two were, in fact, second-cousins; Mansfeld's grandfather and Ernst von Mansfeld's father were half-brothers. (Note: They shared a grandfather and great-grandfather, respectively) Ernst von Mansfeld had originally fought on the side of the Catholics and Leopold V, Archduke of Austria, but conflicts with the Archduke had driven him to join the side of the Protestants.

=== Capture and abjuration ===
In 1622, Ernst von Mansfeld's troops faced the army of Johann Tserclaes, Count of Tilly at the Battle of Mingolsheim. They were victorious but during Tilly's final push, Mansfeld's troops were overwhelmed and he was captured along with a number of other senior officers. Questioned about his relationship to his commanding officer, Mansfeld suggested he was a true Graf von Mansfeld; "ich bin der rechte, vnd der ander nicht" ("I am the true, the other is not") - a reference to his second-cousin's illegitimate birth.

General Albrecht von Wallenstein inquired as to whether he might be persuaded to join (or, in fact, rejoin) the Holy Roman Empire. Mansfeld agreed and joined Wallenstein's forces.

=== Mansfeld's navy at Wismar ===
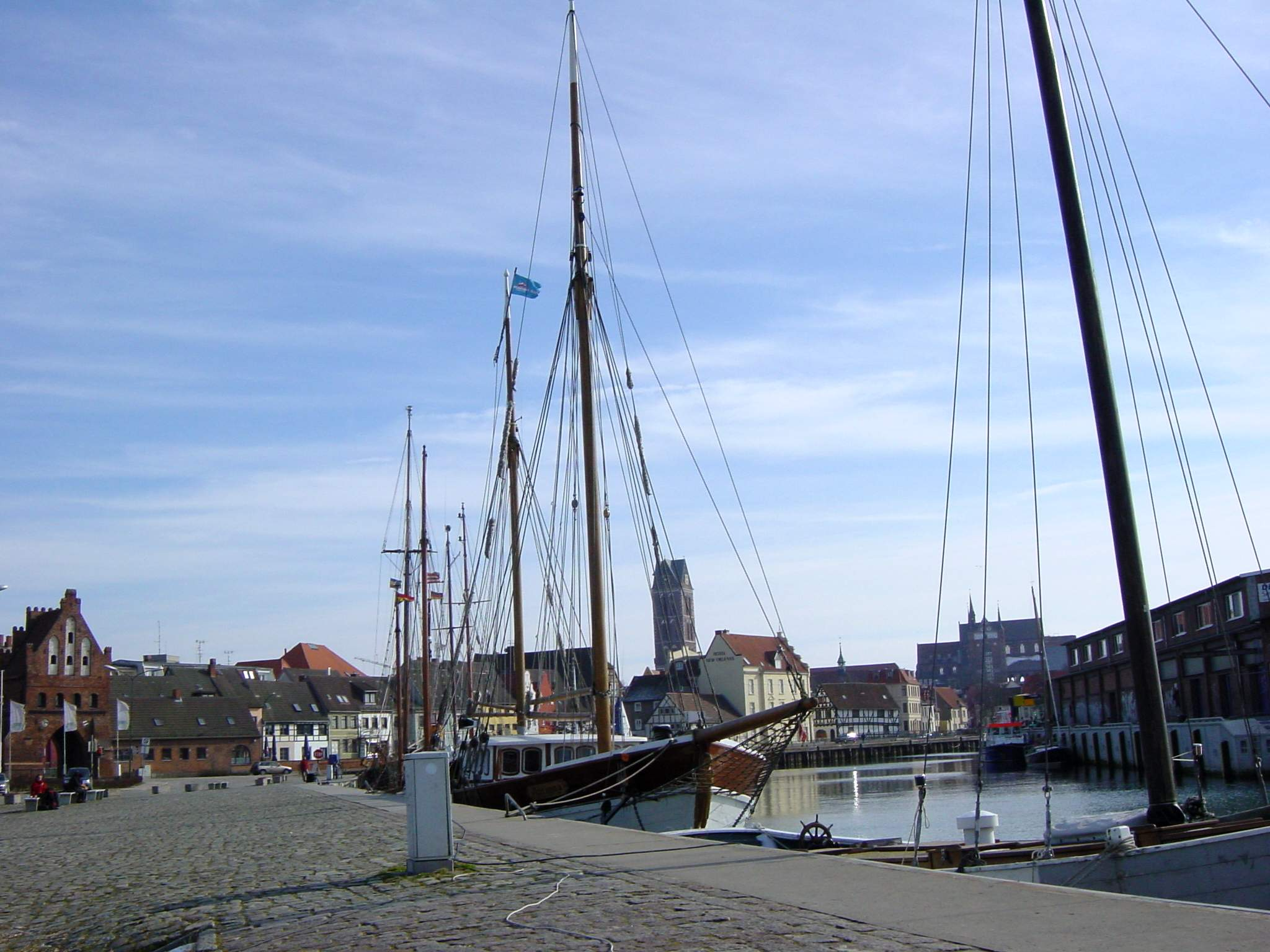
Der Alte Hafen (The Old Harbour) at Wismar.

In 1628, Wallenstein sent Mansfeld to raise a navy at Wismar, on the Baltic Sea. The local mayor was persuaded to give Mansfeld some abandoned buildings, part of an old foundry and an empty yard. Over the following year he "brought together, in fact, a not insignificant naval force" consisting of various vessels either bought from local merchants and converted, or captured and reconfigured. The force included a number of Orlogsschiff, including two built from scratch (Note: The word Orlogsschiff translates to rigger ship; probably the later-style (more substantially rigged) galleons rather than the even-later full-rigged ship,) and two captured Danish sailing barges.

The Danes tried to halt Mansfeld's progress by attacking Wismar in April 1628 and again in June, each time blocking the harbour entrance with barges and bombarding the town with cannon fire from larger ships. The Danes terrorized the town by sending smaller armed sloops into the harbour to capture fishermen. Mansfeld's compound suffered significant damage but his tiny makeshift "navy" was able to drive the Danes back out to sea. The Danes moved to nearby Poel where they captured several Wismarsche fishermen, took them to Denmark, and imprisoned them in Copenhagen until the town paid a ransom of 100 guilders per captive.

The Danes continued to blockade the harbour while Mansfeld continues to build his navy. In 1629, 7 warships from Danzig, send by the Polish king Sigismund Vasa joined the force. On 22 May 1629, the Treaty of Lübeck was signed, effectively bringing an end to Danish involvement in the Thirty Years' War.

=== After the Treaty of Lübeck ===
For a brief period toward the end of 1629, Mansfeld and Julius Henry, Duke of Saxe-Lauenburg were briefly sent to relieve a failed general near Memel.

After the Treaty of Lübeck and the withdrawal of the Danes, Mansfeld's navy continued to defend the Baltic Sea coastline of Germany against the forces of the Swedish Empire but fighting was limited to small skirmishes. In 1630, King Gustavus Adolphus of Sweden landed in Pomerania, to the East of Mansfeld's forces in Wismar. The Duchy of Pomerania capitulated and Bogislaw XIV, Duke of Pomerania, and his councillors negotiated the Treaty of Stettin with Adolphus.

In 1632, Mansfeld was appointed General of the Infantry. The following year, on 16 November 1633 Mansfeld was appointed, Feldmarschall of the Holy Roman Empire.

=== Conflict with the Count Palatine of Neuburg ===
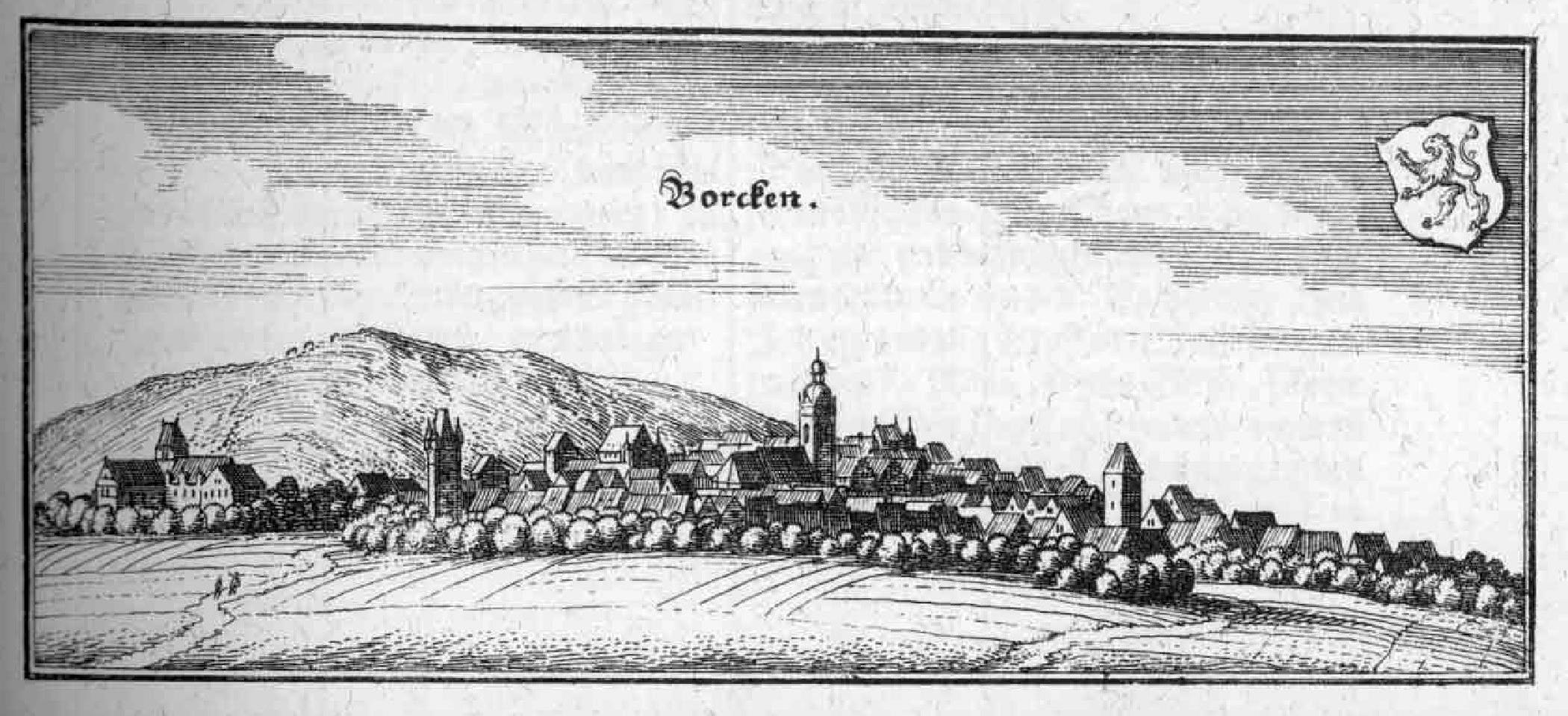
A view of 17th century Borken, Hesse

In 1634, Mansfeld commanded troops in smaller conflicts around Borken and Bönninghausen and his troops caused trouble for villagers and townfolk in neutral regions loyal to Wolfgang William, Count Palatine of Neuburg. In Windeck, 3000 cavalry troops looted various parishes and moved on to Overath, where the church was robbed. Mansfeld's generals and colonels used the opportunity to "fill their pockets at the expense of the country". The Count feared Mansfeld's troops would eventually make it to Düsseldorf and increased the garrison there.

The soldiers were, though, soon brought under control and the Count demanded restitution for damage caused to crops, livestock and property. Mansfeld paid a portion of the claim and records to suggest he remained held in high regard for his skills as a commanding officer. But the damage, in the broader sense, had already been done and in October, Mansfeld was relieved of his command and ordered to pay further compensation.

Archduke Ferdinand of Austria (who later became Holy Roman Emperor), who had been appointed Supreme Commander at the death of General Wallenstein, was also given command of Mansfeld's troops as Feldmarschall.

=== Conflict in Driedorf and Herborn ===
After the Battle of Nördlingen to the South, Mansfeld was given command of a smaller force (Note: The translation is not particularly clear - it could well be that the troops were Mansfeld's own troops (from the towns of which he was Graf/Count) or mercenaries paid directly by Mansfeld himself) which he took, in 1635, to Braunfels and then to Driedorf to counterattacks and looting by Protestant troops and mercenaries. After Driedorf was looted and set alight, Mansfeld marched toward Herborn where there was heavy fighting. Sporadic fighting continued through the first half of 1635 and damage to nearby towns was extensive. Eventually, commanders from either side were convinced to come together in Mainz and negotiate a form of regional truce.

== See also ==
- List of Field Marshals of the Holy Roman Empire
- House of Mansfeld
