= Olbramovice =

Olbramovice may refer to places in the Czech Republic:

- Olbramovice (Benešov District), a municipality and village in the Central Bohemian Region
- Olbramovice (Znojmo District), a market town in the South Moravian Region
