= Flechtingen water castle =

German moated castle complex

Coordinates: 52.3310°N 11.2384°E

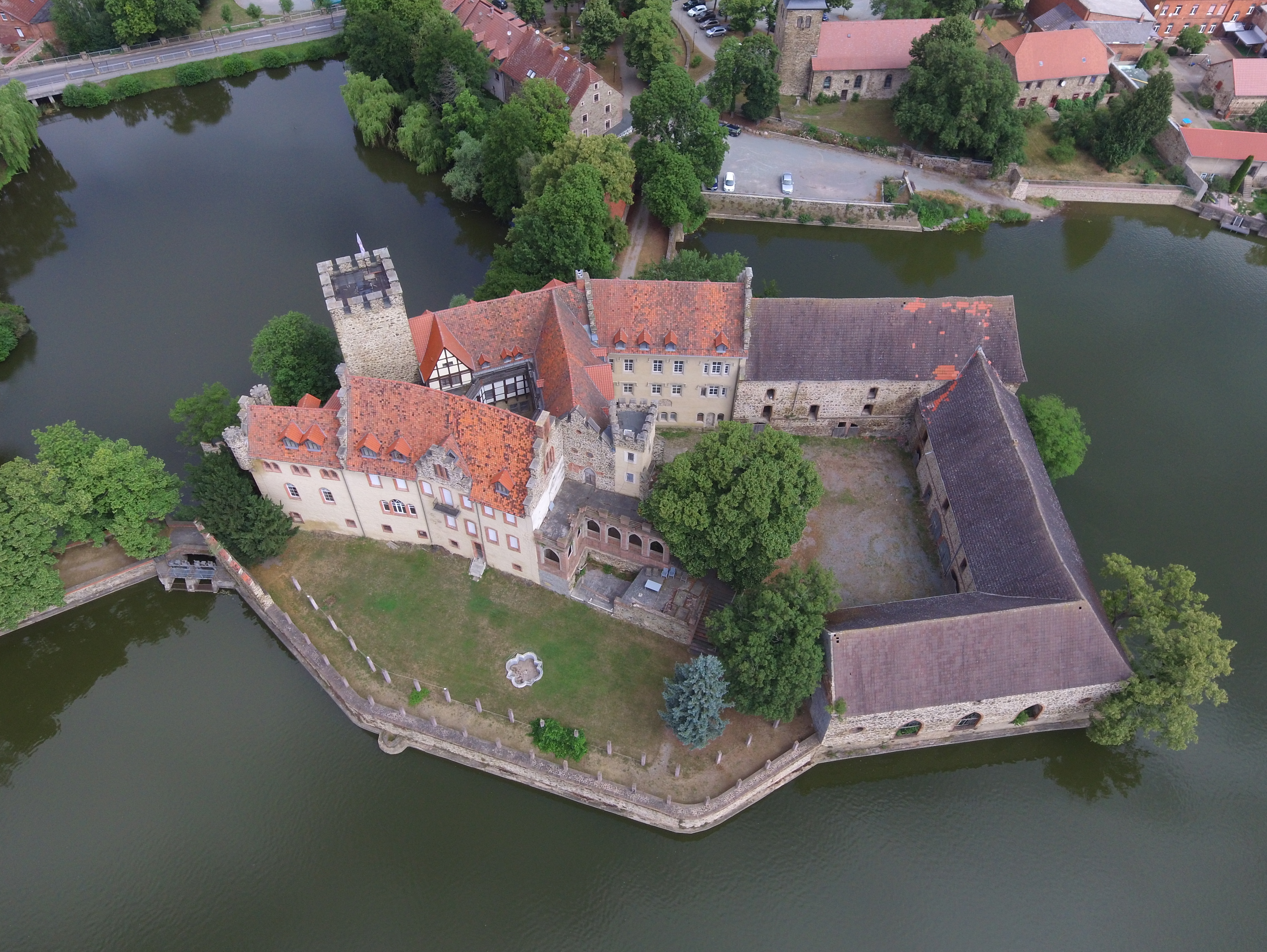
Flechtingen water castle

The Flechtingen water castle or Flechtingen moated castle (German: Wasserschloss Flechtingen or Wasserburg Flechtingen) is a largely well-preserved castle complex in the centre of the municipality of Flechtingen in the district of Börde in Saxony-Anhalt, Germany.

== Location ==
The castle is located in the centre of the village of Flechtingen, in the northern area of the Schloßteich Flechtingen castle pond, which is drained to the north by a river, the Spetze. The main tributary is the Große Renne in the south of the lake. There is an old watermill, the castle mill (de: Schlossmühle) Flechtingen, right next to the drain. Flechtingen is located in the middle of the Magdeburg Börde in today's Börde district in Saxony-Anhalt, Germany.

== History ==
The history of the moated castle began in the first decade of the 14th century. Heinrich von Schenck, who was initially called Heinrich von Dövenstedt, Schenck, whereby Schenck is derived from the court office of Schenk, received Flechtingen as a fief from Herman, Margrave of Brandenburg-Salzwedel for his services. As early as 1307, he and his brother Alverich called themselves Schencken von Dönstedt and Lords of Flechtingen Castle. This was also the first written mention of the facility. So it must have been built before that date. The castle was built on a rocky base in a swampy lowland. The bergfried, the foundation walls of the main castle and the buildings of the outer bailey can be dated to the time when the complex was built. It is assumed that the master builder was the same one who designed or built the castle in nearby Bahrdorf. Contractually Louiss II, Elector of Brandenburg. In 1359, he stipulated in the feudal letter that the castle had to be available to him and his descendants as a place of refuge in times of war. Similar agreements existed with the Duchy of Brunswick and the Archdiocese of Magdeburg, so the castle was often used as a place of refuge.

At the beginning of the 15th century, the moated castle was structurally modified and used as a hunting castle or hunting lodge. The readiness to defend no longer played the central role. Further modifications followed. The outer walls of what later became the castle garden in the south of the complex were built later in their current form after embankments had gained appropriate space. The old castle walls ran closer to the buildings. A farm building in the north of the outer bailey had been a residential building before it was converted. The coach house was in the east. To the south was a stable converted or used as a riding hall in the middle of the 19th century.

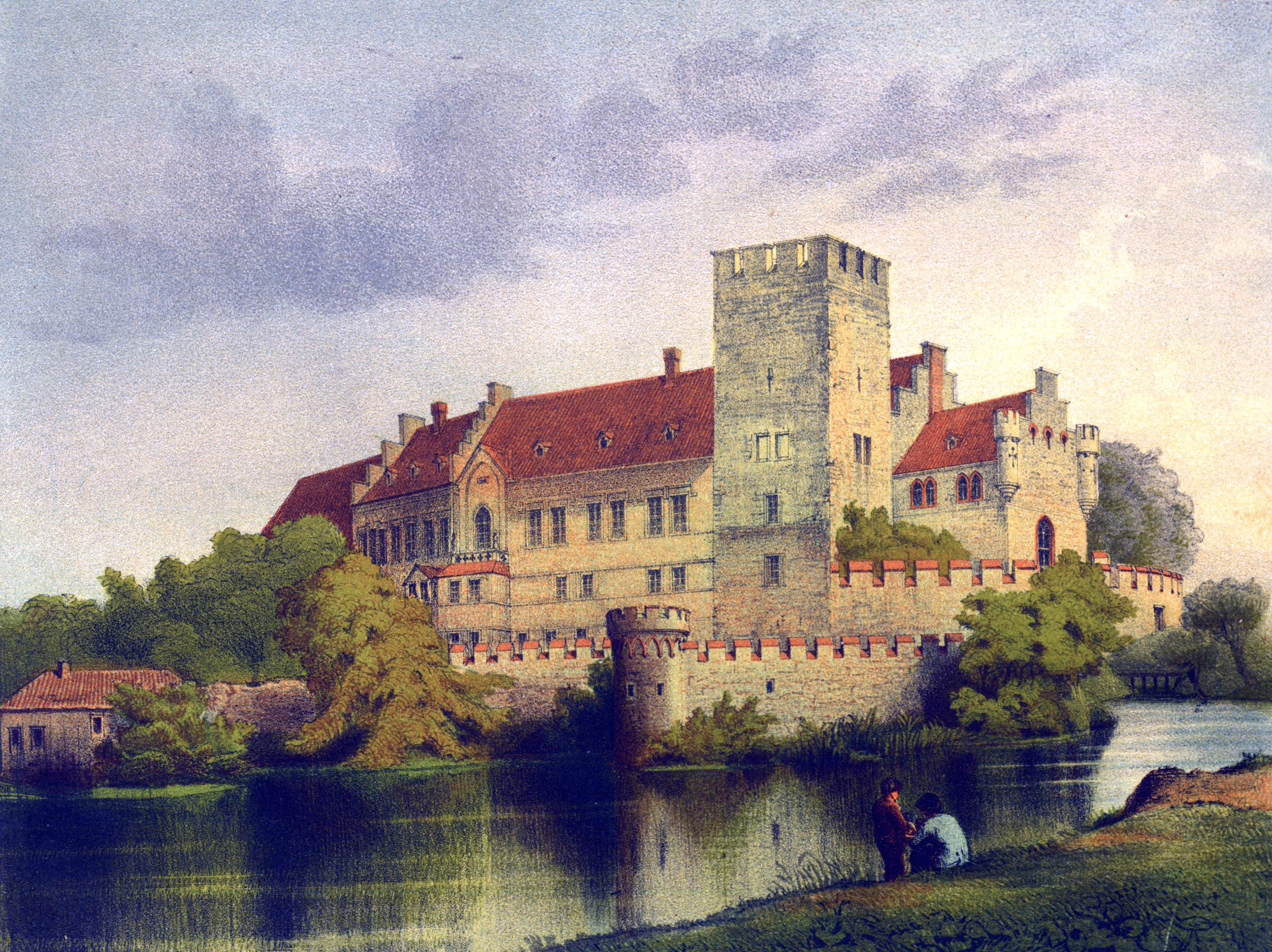
Flechtingen water castle in 1860, Alexander Duncker collection

After a fire in 1483 severely damaged the old Palas in what is now the castle's outbuilding, residential buildings next to the keep in today's main castle were expanded under Rudolf Schenk, creating a new Palas. This construction measure was financed by a loan of 300 gold guilders, which the sons of Rudolf had taken out at a St. Bonifatius chapter in Helmstedt. In the main castle area is the southern building of the cabinet, built in 1526 by the Erbschenk of the Hochstift Halberstadt and the hereditary treasurer of Kurmark Borgward Schenk. The western connection was the brewery of the castle. During the conversion in 1526, this was placed on a floor containing the armoury. Also, in the 16th century, a connecting building was erected between the palace and the cabinet wing, creating two separate courtyards. In 1619, Kersten von Schenck had a staircase tower built in the bailey. In 1692, alterations were made in the Palas area. Around 1860, Eduard von Schenck, who, born von Peucker, came into possession of the property as a result of being adopted by his childless uncle, laid out the castle park on the bank southwest of the castle in its present form. A connecting dam was built in 1864 to the west of the complex to provide direct access from the castle to the park. Also under Eduard, when he ruled the property between 1860 and 1897, a new merlon was added to the keep. The original merlon consisted of three battlements and two battlement windows on each side. Until 1881, there were conversions on the upper floor of the cabinet wing. A Castle garden and terrace were also created as part of these significant renovation measures.

Because of the air raids on Magdeburg in the Second World War, works of art were also removed from Magdeburg Cathedral: the sculpture of Saint Mauritius and valuable grave slabs from archbishops and canons came to the Flechtingen castle.

Until the end of the Second World War, the castle remained in the Schenck family's possession. Immediately after the end of the war, as part of the land reform, all property of the noble family in the Soviet occupation zone of Germany was expropriated without compensation. Pieces of furniture from the castle came to Magdeburg, Halle and Altenhausen, and parts of the castle library went to what later became the city and district library of Magdeburg, today's city library, and other parts were sold.

The property was initially used for refugees and people who had been relocated before it was used as a retirement home and residential accommodation in 1946 and 1947. In 1947, the Saxony-Anhalt social insurance institution opened a so-called convalescent home. From 1950 onwards, a special facility for people suffering from tuberculosis, a dermatological and a psychiatric state sanatorium were housed in the castle. Between 1955 and 1957 the main portal was restored and in April 1958 the National People's Army moved in with its border department. The NVA stayed for five years until 1963. A year later, the moated castle became a home for the elderly again. In order to do justice to the new use, an interior elevator was installed in the keep in 1966. In 1979 the wrought-iron main gate of the park of Hundisburg Castle was built between the castle courtyard and the castle garden. After the political changes in 1989/1990, the castle continued to be used as a retirement home before the retirement home was closed in the spring of 1993. The moated castle was sold to private investors. In October 2000, an expansion to a so-called castle hotel began. However, the investor filed for bankruptcy in December 2004. Since then the building has been unused. The Flechtingen castle has been owned by ADN Investment group since 2019. The interior and the roof have been partially renovated.

== See also ==
- List of castles in Saxony-Anhalt
- List of water castles
- List of castles in Germany
