= Fischbeck =

- Ortsteil of Wust-Fischbeck
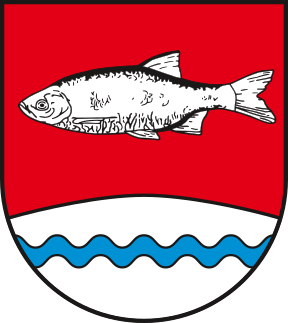
- Coat of arms
- Interactive map of Fischbeck
- Location within Germany Location within Saxony-Anhalt
- Coordinates: 52°32′5″N 12°1′0″E
- Country: Germany
- State: Saxony-Anhalt
- District: Stendal
- Municipality: Wust-Fischbeck

Area
  - Total: 20.66 km^{2} (7.98 sq mi)
- Elevation: 32 m (105 ft)

Population (2022-05-15)
  - Total: 335
  - Density: 16.2/km^{2} (42.0/sq mi)
- Time zone: UTC+01:00 (CET)
  - Summer (DST): UTC+02:00 (CEST)
- Postal codes: 39524
- Dialling codes: 039323
- Vehicle registration: SDL

Fischbeck (Elbe) is a village and a former municipality in the district of Stendal, in Saxony-Anhalt, Germany. Since 1 January 2010, it is part of the municipality Wust-Fischbeck.
