= Elbe-Havel-Land =

- Verbandsgemeinde
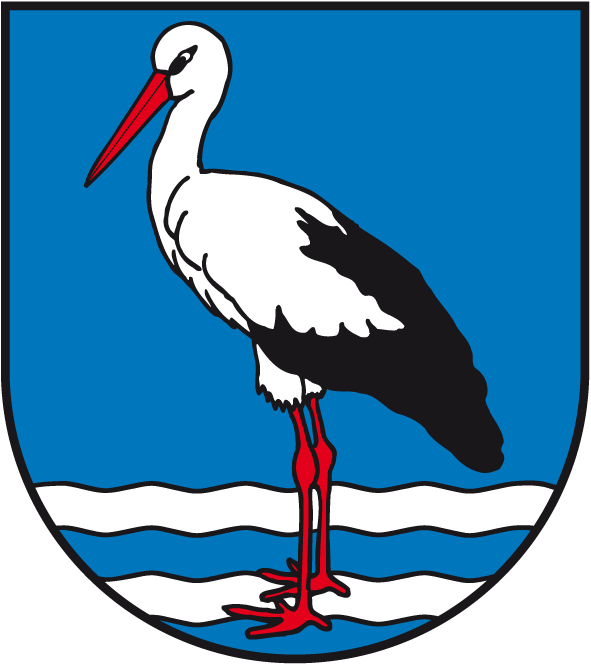
- Coat of arms

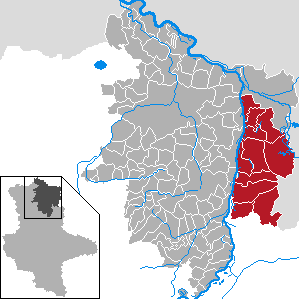
- Map of Stendal highlighting Elbe-Havel-Land
- Interactive map of Elbe-Havel-Land
- Location within Germany Location within Saxony-Anhalt
- Coordinates: 52°35′N 12°02′E
- Country: Germany
- State: Saxony-Anhalt
- District: Stendal
- Seat: Schönhausen
- Subdivisions: 6 municipalities

Area
  - Total: 360.41 km^{2} (139.16 sq mi)

Population (2025-12-31)
  - Total: 7,599
  - Density: 21.08/km^{2} (54.61/sq mi)
- Time zone: UTC+01:00 (CET)
  - Summer (DST): UTC+02:00 (CEST)
- Website: www.elbe-havel-land.de

Elbe-Havel-Land is a Verbandsgemeinde ("collective municipality") in the district of Stendal, in Saxony-Anhalt, Germany. Until 1 January 2010, it was a Verwaltungsgemeinschaft. It is situated on the right bank of the Elbe, south of Havelberg. The seat of the Verbandsgemeinde is in Schönhausen.

The Verbandsgemeinde Elbe-Havel-Land consists of the following municipalities:

1. Kamern
2. Klietz
3. Sandau
4. Schönhausen
5. Schollene
6. Wust-Fischbeck
