= Wüst =

Wüst (or Wuest) is a surname that may refer to

- Craig Wuest, American keyboardist
- Dorothee Wüst (born 1965), German bishop
- Georg Wüst (1890–1977), German oceanographer
- Hendrik Wüst (born 1975), German politician
- Ireen Wüst (born 1986), Dutch long track allround speed skater
- Josef Wüst (1925–2003), Austrian journalist, editor-in-chief and publisher
- Kenneth Wuest (1893–1962), New Testament Greek scholar
- Marcel Wüst (born 1967), German road bicycle racer
- Markus Wüst (born 1971), Swiss Nordic combined skier
- Ryan Wuest, (born 1981), South African football player
- Walther Wüst (1901–1993), German Orientalist, President of the SS Ahnenerbe Research Institute
