= Wulkau =

- Ortsteil of Kamern
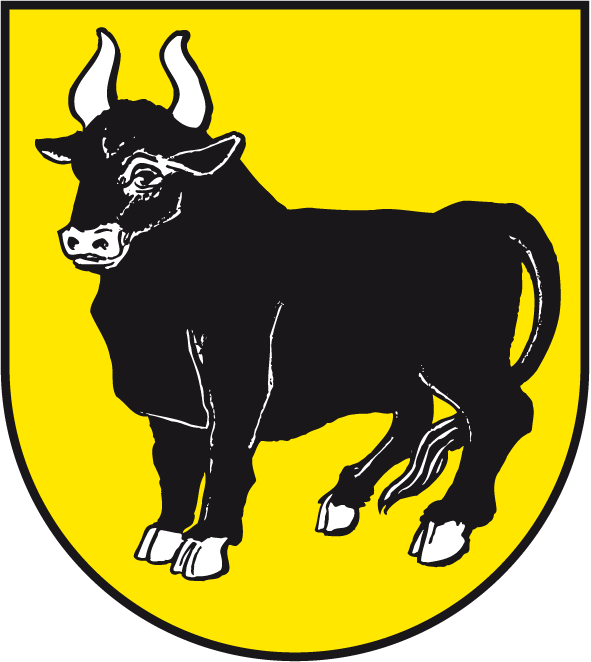
- Coat of arms
- Interactive map of Wulkau
- Location within Germany Location within Saxony-Anhalt
- Coordinates: 52°45′54″N 12°4′0″E
- Country: Germany
- State: Saxony-Anhalt
- District: Stendal
- Municipality: Kamern

Area
  - Total: 15.71 km^{2} (6.07 sq mi)
- Elevation: 27 m (89 ft)

Population (2006-12-31)
  - Total: 450
  - Density: 29/km^{2} (74/sq mi)
- Time zone: UTC+01:00 (CET)
  - Summer (DST): UTC+02:00 (CEST)
- Postal codes: 39524
- Dialling codes: 039383
- Vehicle registration: SDL

Wulkau is a village and a former municipality in the district of Stendal, in Saxony-Anhalt, Germany. Since 1 January 2010 it has been part of the municipality of Kamern.
