= Monastery of Goseck =

Monastery

Goseck
- Location within Saxony-Anhalt Location within Germany

General information
- Type: Monastery
- Location: Saxony-Anhalt, Germany
- Coordinates: 51°11′25″N 11°52′11″E
- Landlord: Foundation "Dome und Schlösser Sachsen-Anhalt"

Goseck, a monastery built on the foundations of a castle, as well as the vineyard of Dechantenberg is located in the municipality of Goseck of Saxony-Anhalt in Germany. It has been proposed by Germany for inscription in the List of World Heritage. The World Heritage nomination Naumburg Cathedral and the High Medieval Cultural Landscape of the Rivers Saale and Unstrut is a representative of the processes that shaped the continent during the High Middle Ages between 1000 and 1300: Christianization, the so-called "Landesausbau" and the dynamics of cultural exchange and transfer characteristic for this very period.

== World Heritage Nomination ==
Goseck and its vineyard is one of the eleven components of the cultural landscape Naumburg Cathedral and the High Medieval Cultural Landscape of the Rivers Saale and Unstrut. Together with the agricultural features on the northern slopes of the Saale and the sandstone quarries used for the building of the monastery, this ensemble conveys the different forms of land use of the medieval monastery structures.

== History ==
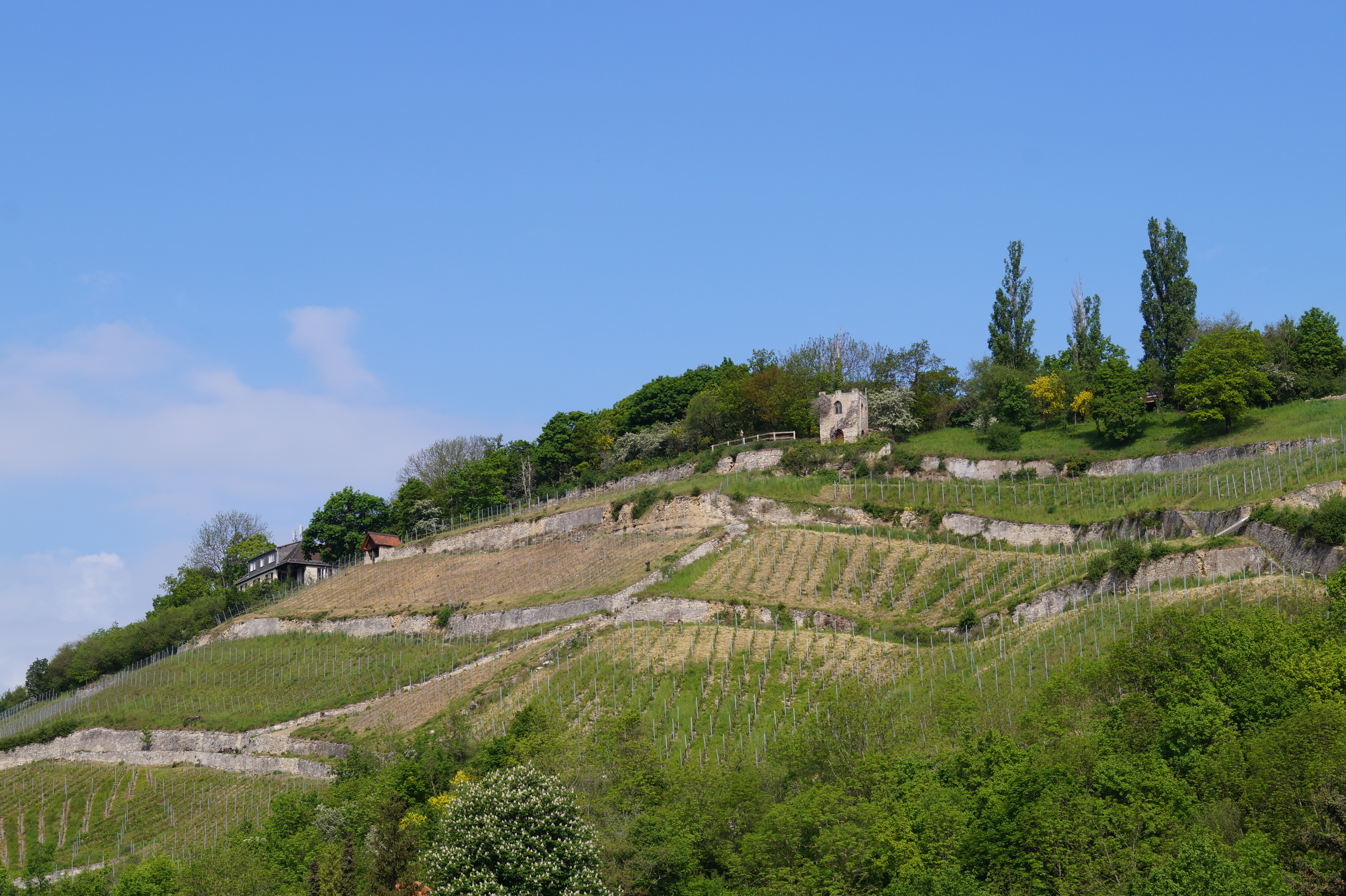
Vineyard Steinmeister

Goseck Castle was part of a network of Frankish castles on the Saale River. It was founded around the year 800. The counts of Goseck were one of the noblest aristocratic families of the empire in the 10th and 11th century. Count Frederick I of Goseck had his center of power in Goseck. In 1041, Adalbert (archbishop of Hamburg-Bremen from 1043) founded a Benedictine monastery in the eastern part of the noble castle of Goseck. The minster was erected in 1046.

== Location ==
It is situated 9 kilometers northeast of Naumburg across the Saale Valley on the opposite bank. This monastery of the 11th century is a preserved and documented structure of the High Middle Ages. It was built to be visible from afar, offering lines of sight to most of the monuments in the nominated areas.

== Architecture ==
The crypt and choir of the monastery church are oustanding examples of Salian architecture. Goseck is an example for the transformation of a noble family's hereditary seat into a monastery with dynastic memorial tasks.

== Viniculture ==
In the chronicles of the Benedictines of the Goseck monastery, the terraced vineyard below the site is dated back to the year 1093; it is the oldest vineyard in continuous use in the nominated region. The Dechantenberg vineyard is exposed to the south.

== Today ==
Around 1540, the monastery was secularized. Since 1997, Goseck is owned by the "Landesstiftung Dome und Schlösser Sachsen-Anhalt", a state foundation endowed by the State of Saxony-Anhalt. Today, a European Centre for Music and Culture ("Europäisches Musik und Kulturzentrum") resides in Goseck and offers a range of cultural activities. (Note: For further information: http://www.dome-schloesser.de/.)

== See also ==
- World Heritage Convention
- World Heritage Site
- World Heritage Committee
- High Middle Ages
- Cultural Landscape
