= Kamern =

- Municipality
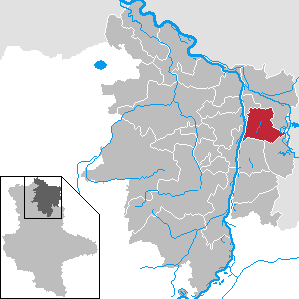
- Location of Kamern within Stendal district
- Interactive map of Kamern
- Location within Germany Location within Saxony-Anhalt
- Coordinates: 52°45′N 12°7′E
- Country: Germany
- State: Saxony-Anhalt
- District: Stendal
- Municipal assoc.: Elbe-Havel-Land

Government
  - Mayor (2021–28): Arno Brandt

Area
  - Total: 67.83 km^{2} (26.19 sq mi)
- Elevation: 25 m (82 ft)

Population (2025-12-31)
  - Total: 1,150
  - Density: 17.0/km^{2} (43.9/sq mi)
- Time zone: UTC+01:00 (CET)
  - Summer (DST): UTC+02:00 (CEST)
- Postal codes: 39524
- Dialling codes: 039382, 039383
- Vehicle registration: SDL
- Website: www.kamern.de

Kamern (German pronunciation: [ˈkaːmɐn]) is a municipality in the district of Stendal, in Saxony-Anhalt, Germany. In January 2010 it absorbed the former municipalities Schönfeld and Wulkau.
