= Schönfeld, Saxony-Anhalt =

Schönfeld
- Ortsteil of Kamern
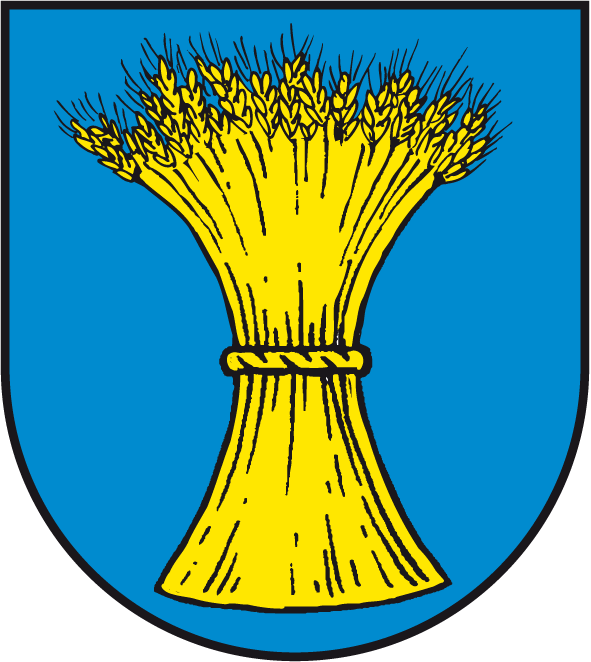
- Coat of arms
- Interactive map of Schönfeld
- Location within Germany Location within Saxony-Anhalt
- Coordinates: 52°44′N 12°4′E
- Country: Germany
- State: Saxony-Anhalt
- District: Stendal
- Municipality: Kamern

Area
  - Total: 20.30 km^{2} (7.84 sq mi)
- Elevation: 27 m (89 ft)

Population (2006-12-31)
  - Total: 231
  - Density: 11.4/km^{2} (29.5/sq mi)
- Time zone: UTC+01:00 (CET)
  - Summer (DST): UTC+02:00 (CEST)
- Postal codes: 39524
- Dialling codes: 039382
- Vehicle registration: SDL

Schönfeld is a village and a former municipality in the district of Stendal, in Saxony-Anhalt, Germany. Since 1 January 2010, it is part of the municipality Kamern.
