= Goseck =

- Municipality
- Location of Goseck within Burgenlandkreis district
- Interactive map of Goseck
- Location within Germany Location within Saxony-Anhalt
- Coordinates: 51°11′41″N 11°52′18″E
- Country: Germany
- State: Saxony-Anhalt
- District: Burgenlandkreis
- Municipal assoc.: Unstruttal

Government
  - Mayor (2022–29): Hilmar Panse

Area
  - Total: 14.57 km^{2} (5.63 sq mi)
- Elevation: 152 m (499 ft)

Population (2025-12-31)
  - Total: 974
  - Density: 66.8/km^{2} (173/sq mi)
- Time zone: UTC+01:00 (CET)
  - Summer (DST): UTC+02:00 (CEST)
- Postal codes: 06667
- Dialling codes: 03443
- Vehicle registration: BLK

Goseck is a municipality lying on the river Saale, in the Burgenlandkreis district of the German state of Saxony-Anhalt.

== Geography ==
Goseck is located on the north bank of the Saale, about halfway between Naumburg and Weißenfels.

The municipality consists of the settlements Goseck and Markröhlitz.

== History ==
=== Early period ===
The first evidence of human settlement is from the Neolithic period, the Goseck circle, dating to approximately the 5th millennium BC, discovered by aerial photographs from the 1990s and, since 2003, regarded as the oldest observatory in Europe. It consists of a circular Henge-construction with a diameter of 75 m. It marks the beginning of a millennia-old astronomical tradition known also from the Nebra skydisk, discovered in 1999, only 25 km distant therefrom. By means of a visor mechanism, the operators were able to, e.g., accurately determine the times of the summer and winter solstice. The reconstructed observatory was opened on the winter solstice, 21 December 2005, with great pageantry, including a spectacular fireworks display.

=== Modern times ===
Goseck grew in the fields surrounding the 11th-century monastery St. Mary and St. Michael. Originally an early medieval castle, first mentioned as Gozzesburg in the Hersfeld Tithe Register of 881, the Saxon palatial county seat of government was located here.

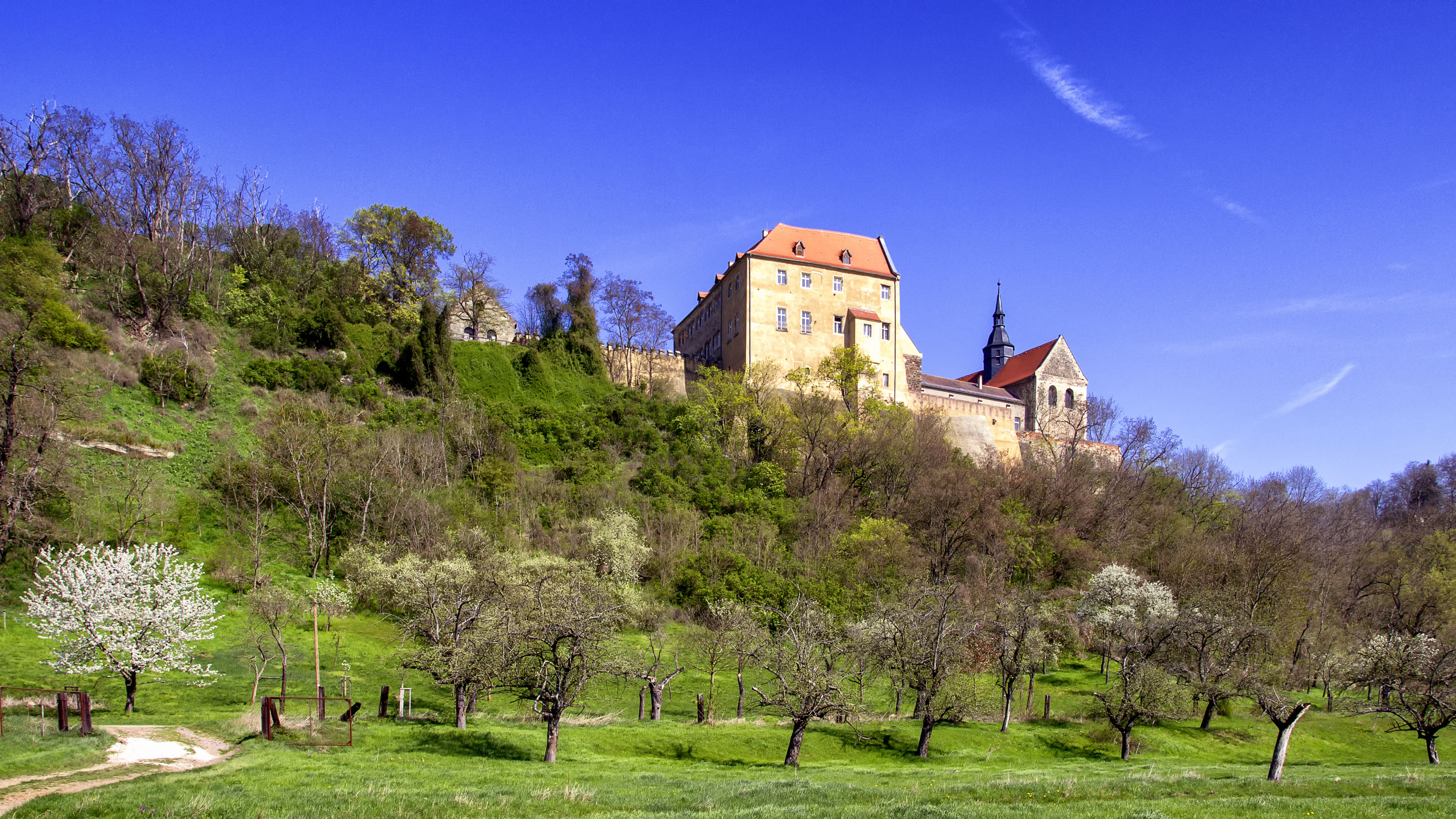
Goseck Castle above the Saale river.

== Economics and infrastructure ==
=== Traffic ===
The only road access to Goseck is from Markröhlitz, from which local roads lead to Naumburg, Weißenfels and Pettstädt.
