= Huy, Germany =

Huy
- Municipality
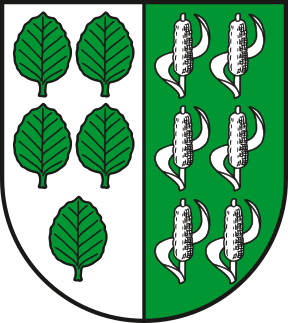
- Coat of arms

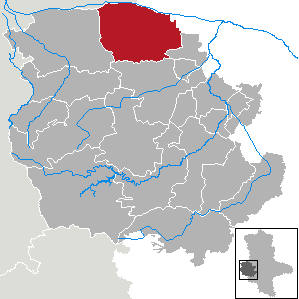
- Location of Huy within Harz district
- Interactive map of Huy
- Location within Germany Location within Saxony-Anhalt
- Coordinates: 51°58′N 10°55′E
- Country: Germany
- State: Saxony-Anhalt
- District: Harz
- Subdivisions: 11

Government
  - Mayor (2021–28): Maik Berger (SPD)

Area
  - Total: 167.28 km^{2} (64.59 sq mi)
- Elevation: 80–314 m (262–1,030 ft)

Population (2025-12-31)
  - Total: 6,528
  - Density: 39.02/km^{2} (101.1/sq mi)
- Time zone: UTC+01:00 (CET)
  - Summer (DST): UTC+02:00 (CEST)
- Postal codes: 38836, 38838
- Dialling codes: 039401, 039422, 039425, 039428
- Vehicle registration: HZ
- Website: www.gemeindehuy.de

Huy (German pronunciation: [ˈhyː]) is a municipality in the district of Harz, in Saxony-Anhalt, Germany, established in April 2002 by the merger of eleven former municipalities. It is named after the small Huy hill range and situated about 10 kilometres northwest of Halberstadt.

Huy municipality consists of the following 11 Ortschaften or municipal divisions (former municipalities):

- Aderstedt
- Anderbeck
- Badersleben
- Dedeleben
- Dingelstedt am Huy
- Eilenstedt
- Eilsdorf
- Huy-Neinstedt
- Pabstorf
- Schlanstedt
- Vogelsdorf

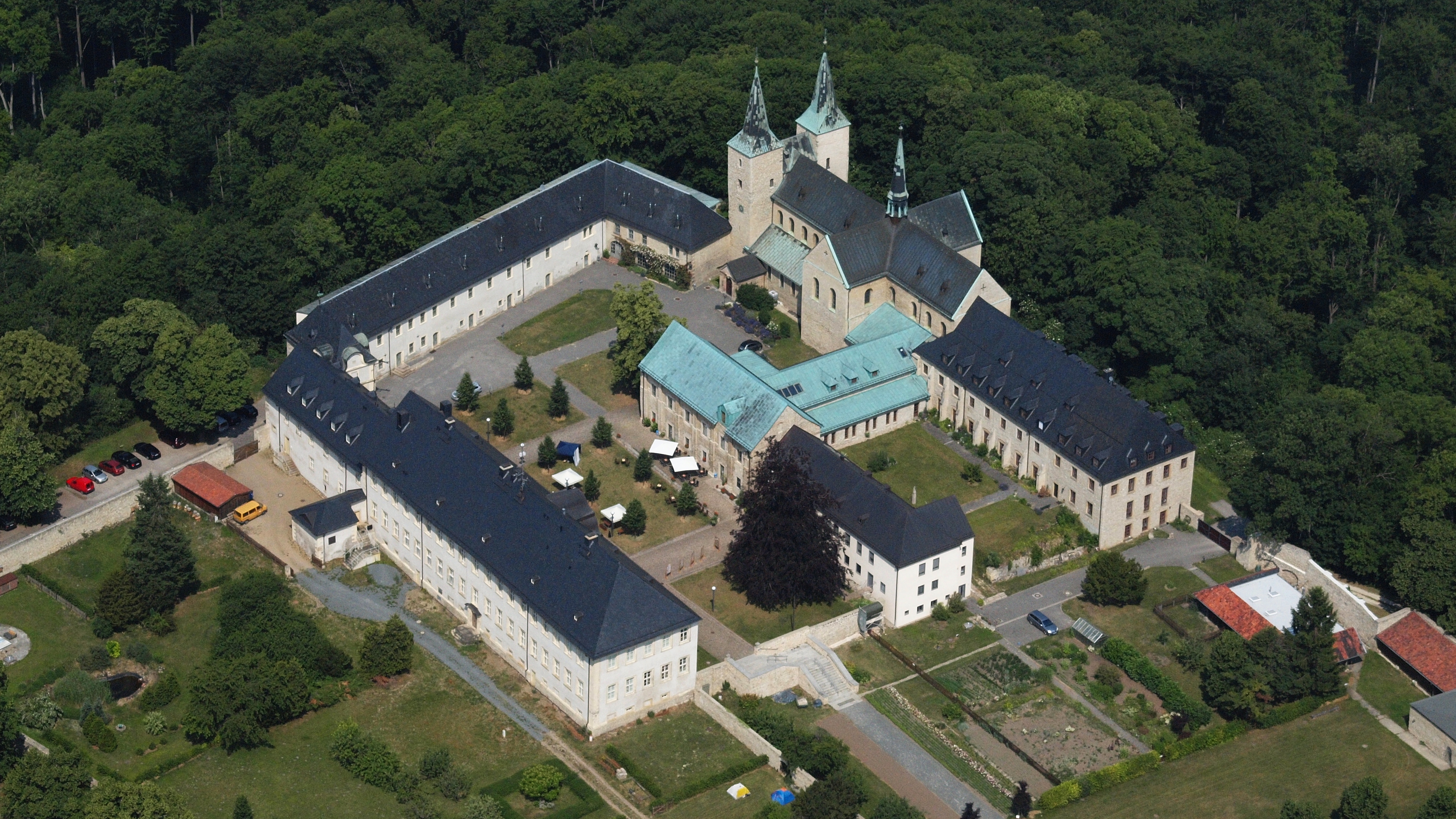
Huysburg
