= Sandau =

- Town
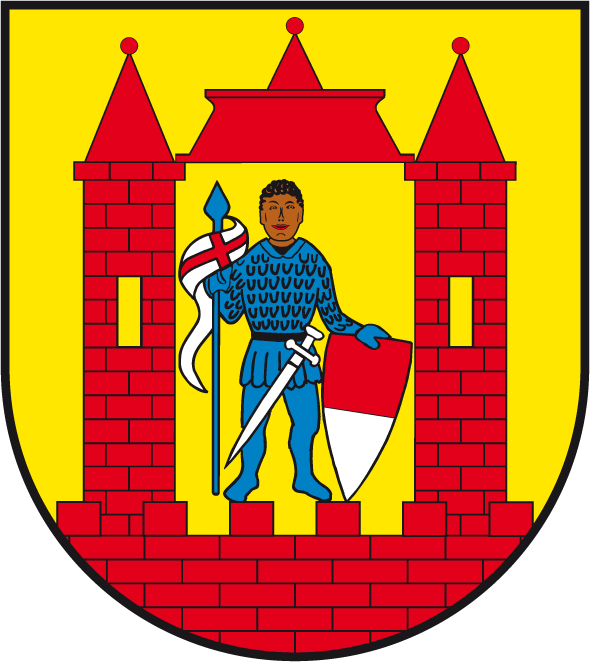
- Coat of arms

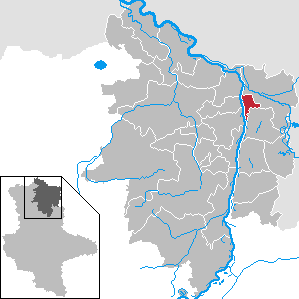
- Location of Sandau within Stendal district
- Interactive map of Sandau
- Location within Germany Location within Saxony-Anhalt
- Coordinates: 52°47′N 12°3′E
- Country: Germany
- State: Saxony-Anhalt
- District: Stendal
- Municipal assoc.: Elbe-Havel-Land

Government
  - Mayor (2021–28): Claudia Lange

Area
  - Total: 18.58 km^{2} (7.17 sq mi)
- Elevation: 27 m (89 ft)

Population (2025-12-31)
  - Total: 806
  - Density: 43.4/km^{2} (112/sq mi)
- Time zone: UTC+01:00 (CET)
  - Summer (DST): UTC+02:00 (CEST)
- Postal codes: 39524
- Dialling codes: 039383
- Vehicle registration: SDL
- Website: www.sandau.de

Sandau (German pronunciation: [ˈzandaʊ]) is a town in the district of Stendal, in Sachsen-Anhalt, Germany. It is situated on the right bank of the Elbe, approx. 5 km (3.1 mi) south of Havelberg. It is part of the Verbandsgemeinde ("collective municipality") Elbe-Havel-Land.

The Sandau Ferry, a cable ferry across the Elbe, connects Sandau to Büttnershof.

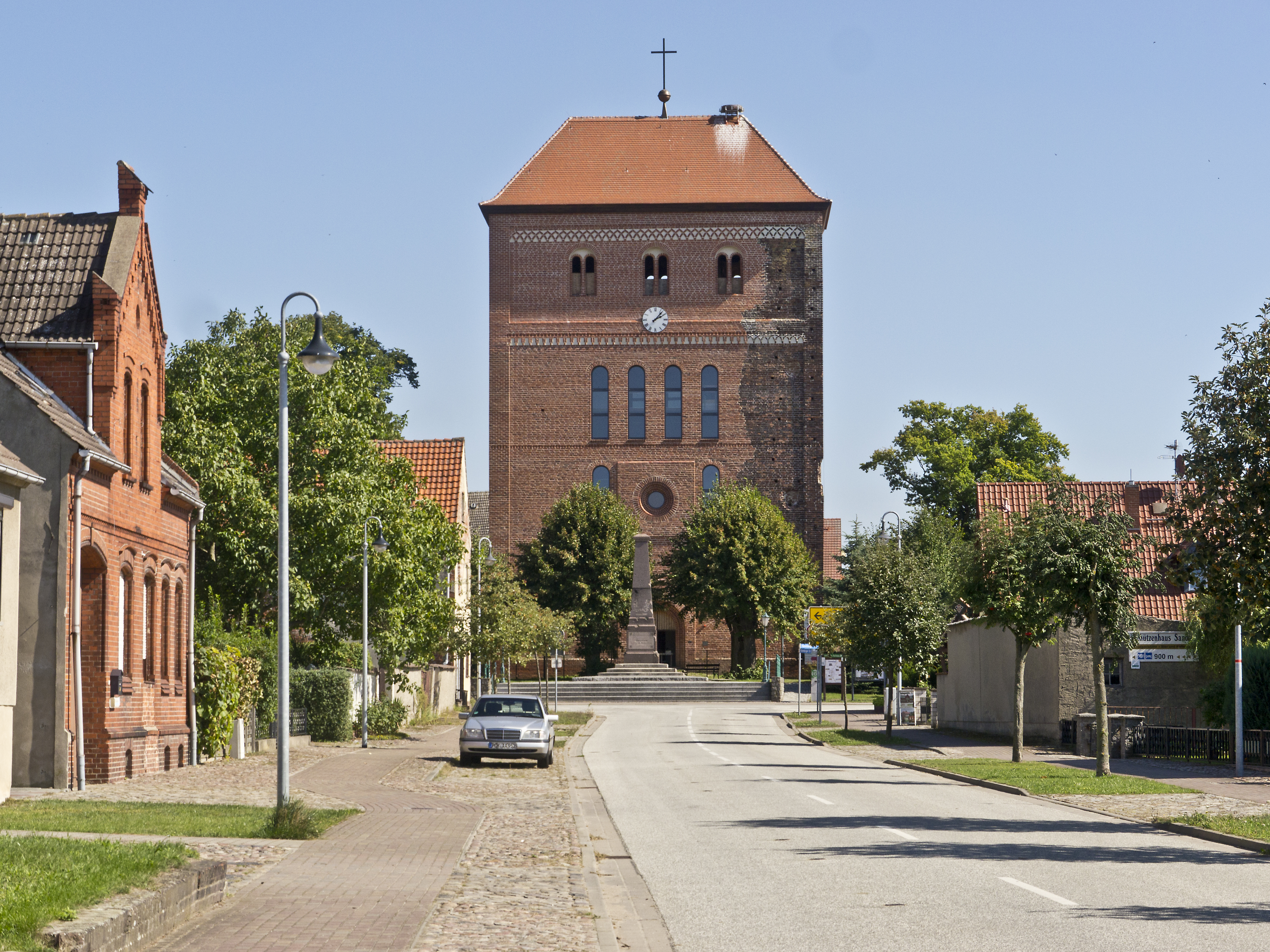
Tower of the Lutheran Church

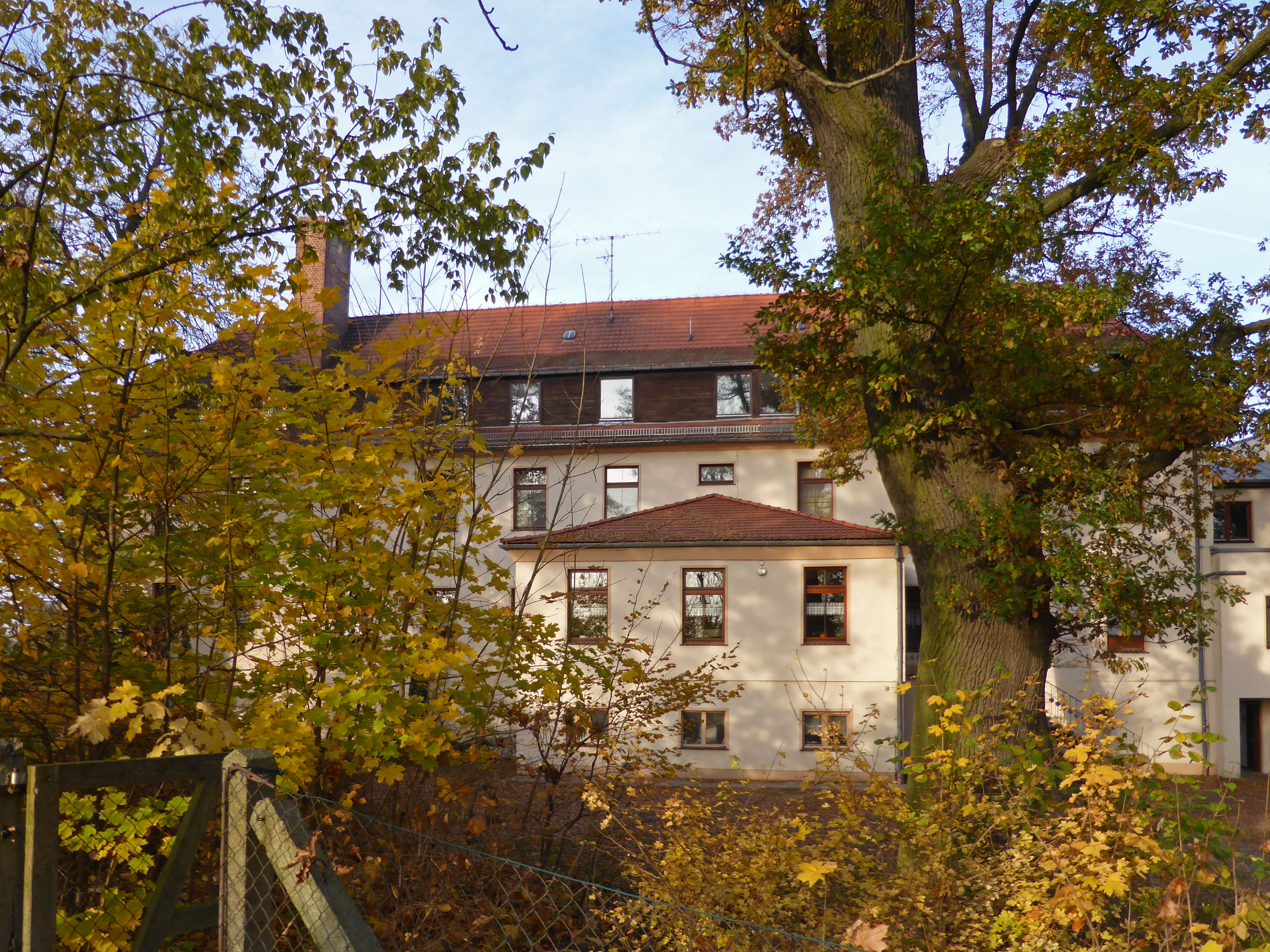
Castle Sandau
