= Wüstenjerichow =

- Stadtteil of Möckern
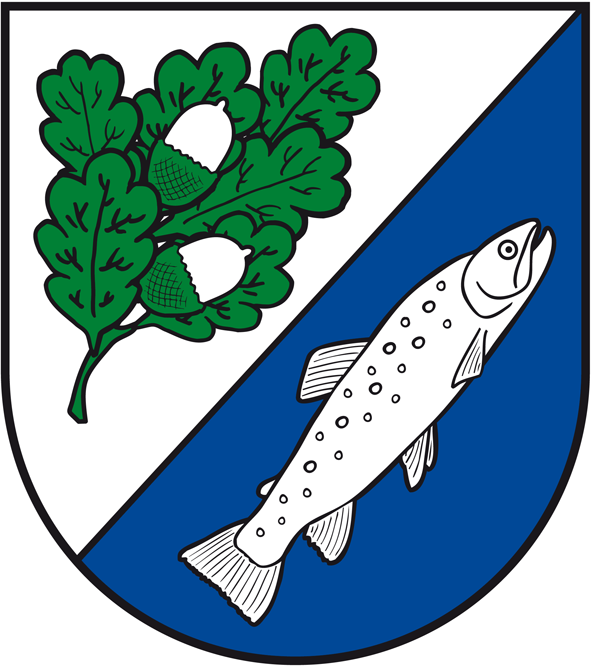
- Coat of arms
- Interactive map of Wüstenjerichow
- Location within Germany Location within Saxony-Anhalt
- Coordinates: 52°13′N 12°7′E
- Country: Germany
- State: Saxony-Anhalt
- District: Jerichower Land
- Town: Möckern

Area
  - Total: 21.43 km^{2} (8.27 sq mi)
- Elevation: 81 m (266 ft)

Population (2006-12-31)
  - Total: 127
  - Density: 5.93/km^{2} (15.3/sq mi)
- Time zone: UTC+01:00 (CET)
  - Summer (DST): UTC+02:00 (CEST)
- Postal codes: 39291
- Dialling codes: 039225

Wüstenjerichow is a village and a former municipality in the Jerichower Land district, in Saxony-Anhalt, Germany.

Since 1 January 2010, it has been part of the town Möckern.
