= Wust-Fischbeck =

- Municipality
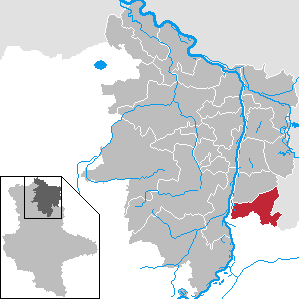
- Location of Wust-Fischbeck within Stendal district
- Interactive map of Wust-Fischbeck
- Location within Germany Location within Saxony-Anhalt
- Coordinates: 52°33′N 12°4′E
- Country: Germany
- State: Saxony-Anhalt
- District: Stendal
- Municipal assoc.: Elbe-Havel-Land

Government
  - Mayor (2023–30): Hans Jörg Hellmuth (CDU)

Area
  - Total: 68.15 km^{2} (26.31 sq mi)
- Elevation: 31 m (102 ft)

Population (2025-12-31)
  - Total: 1,141
  - Density: 16.74/km^{2} (43.36/sq mi)
- Time zone: UTC+01:00 (CET)
  - Summer (DST): UTC+02:00 (CEST)
- Postal codes: 39524
- Dialling codes: 039323
- Vehicle registration: SDL
- Website: www.elbe-havel-land.de

Wust-Fischbeck (German pronunciation: [ˈvʊst ˈfɪʃbɛk]) is a municipality in the district of Stendal, in Saxony-Anhalt, Germany. It was formed on 1 January 2010 by the merger of the former municipalities Wust and Fischbeck.
