= Ryan Wuest =

South African-Swiss footballer (born 1981)

Ryan Wuest (born 27 February 1981) is a South African former soccer player who played as a goalkeeper, lastly for Bloemfontein Celtic in the Premier Soccer League. He also holds a Swiss passport.

- Joined Celtic: 2009
- Previous clubs: Bloemfontein Celtic, Kaizer Chiefs, APEP Kyperounda, Santos, Manning Rangers
