= Schollene =

- Municipality
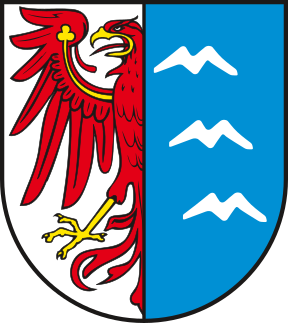
- Coat of arms

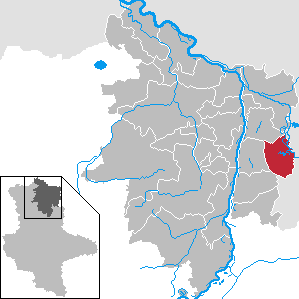
- Location of Schollene within Stendal district
- Interactive map of Schollene
- Location within Germany Location within Saxony-Anhalt
- Coordinates: 52°41′N 12°13′E
- Country: Germany
- State: Saxony-Anhalt
- District: Stendal
- Municipal assoc.: Elbe-Havel-Land

Government
  - Mayor (2024–31): Jörg Wartke (Ind.)

Area
  - Total: 65.33 km^{2} (25.22 sq mi)
- Elevation: 20 m (66 ft)

Population (2025-12-31)
  - Total: 1,056
  - Density: 16.16/km^{2} (41.86/sq mi)
- Time zone: UTC+01:00 (CET)
  - Summer (DST): UTC+02:00 (CEST)
- Postal codes: 14715
- Dialling codes: 039389
- Vehicle registration: SDL
- Website: www.schollene-land.de

Schollene (German pronunciation: [ʃɔˈleːnə]) is a municipality in the district of Stendal, in Saxony-Anhalt, Germany.

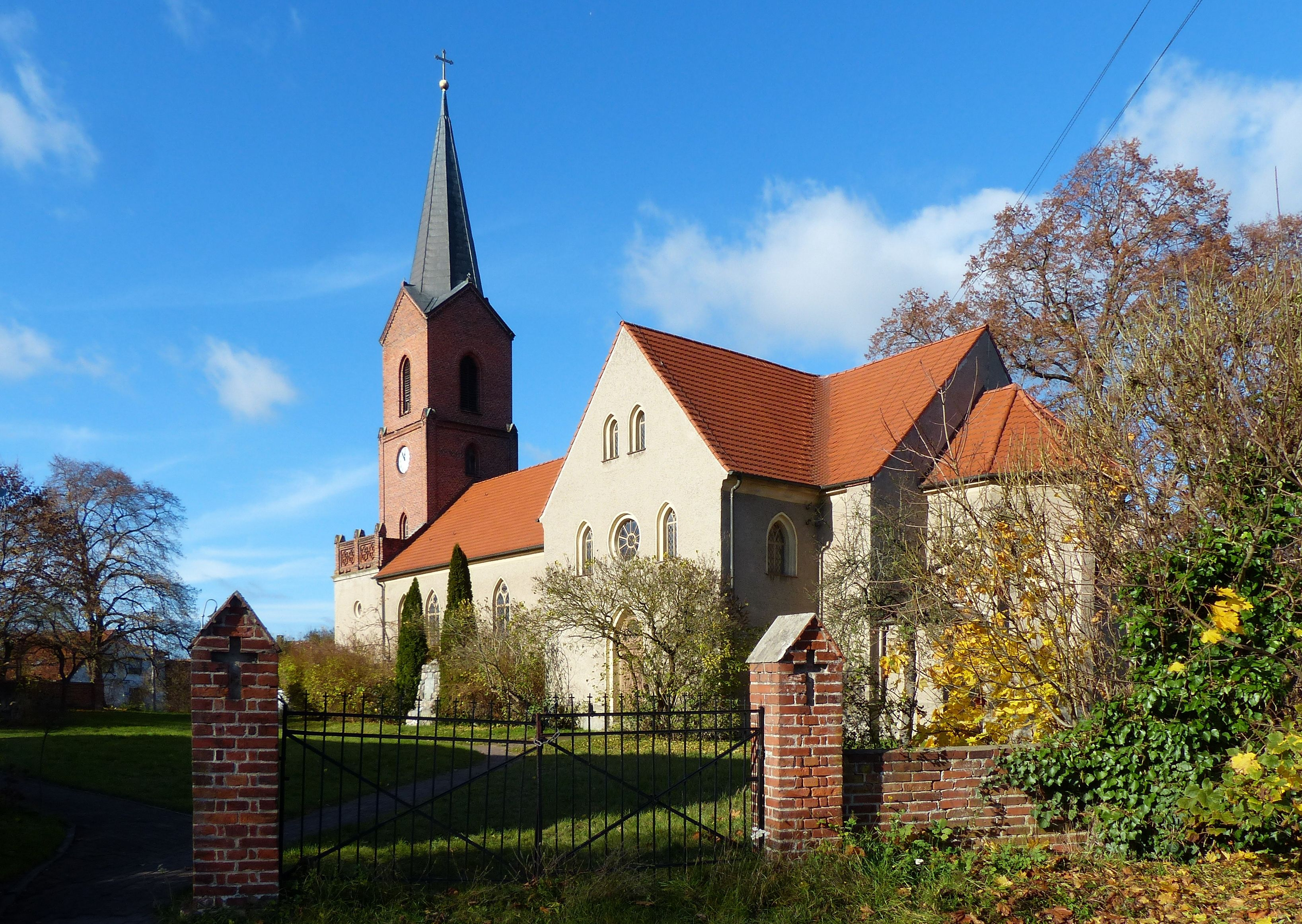
The Lutheran Church
