= Olbramovice (Znojmo District) =

- Market town
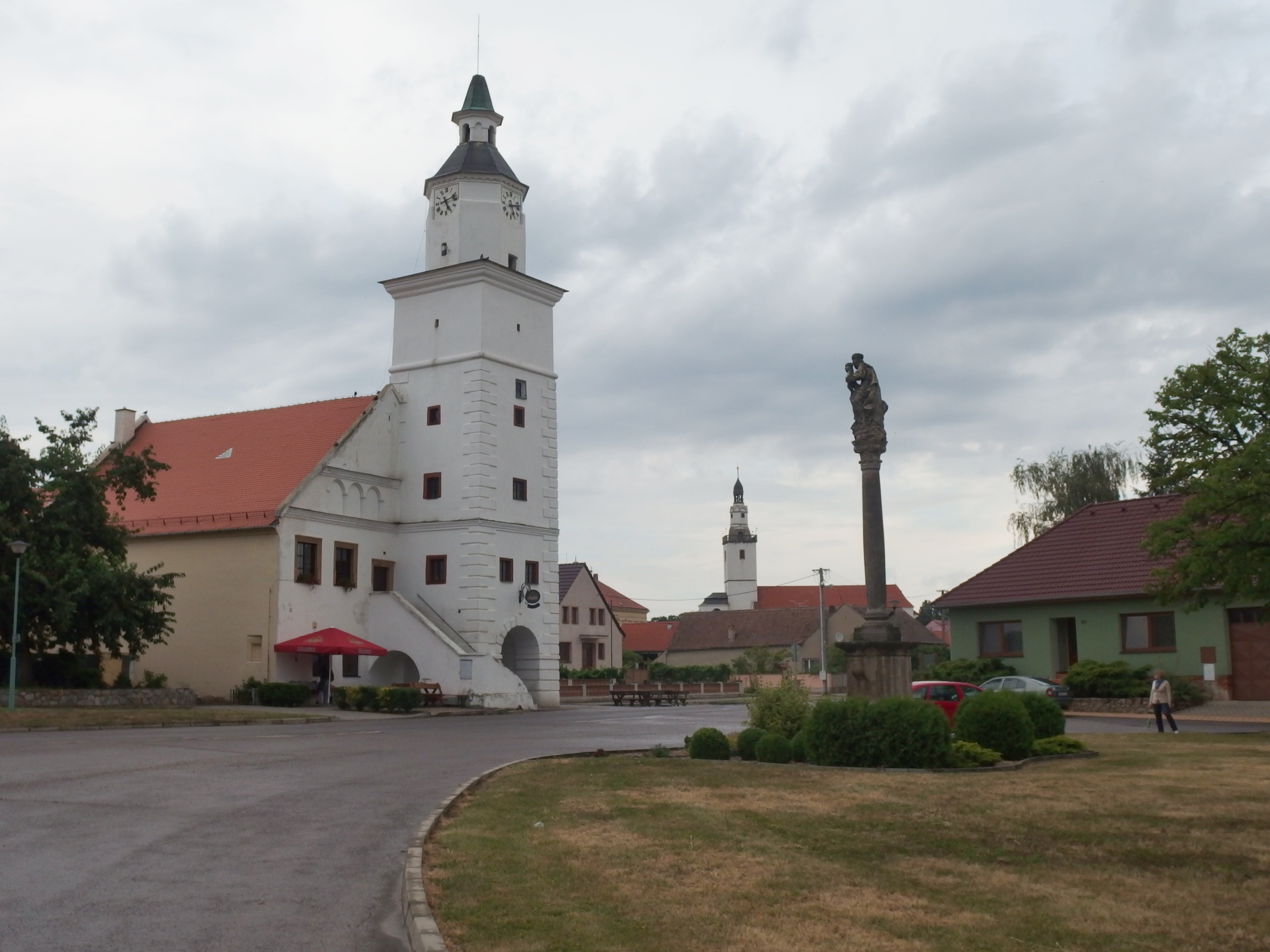
- Market square

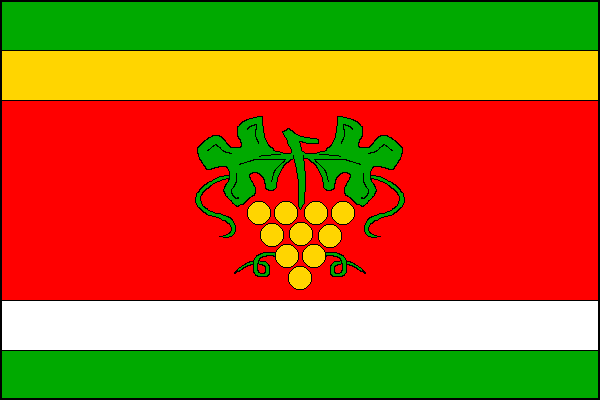
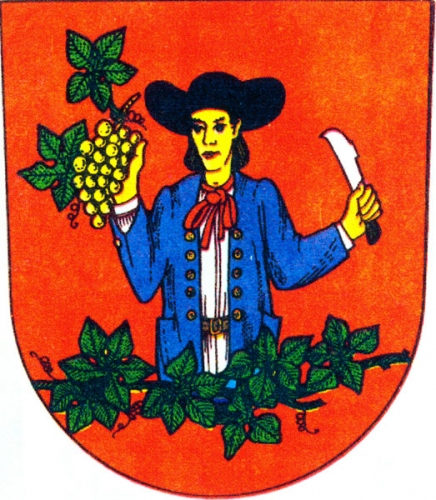
- Flag Coat of arms

- Location in the Czech Republic
- Coordinates: 48°59′20″N 16°23′51″E
- Country: Czech Republic
- Region: South Moravian
- District: Znojmo
- First mentioned: 1063

Area
  - Total: 17.12 km^{2} (6.61 sq mi)
- Elevation: 200 m (660 ft)

Population (2026-01-01)
  - Total: 1,177
  - Density: 68.75/km^{2} (178.1/sq mi)
- Time zone: UTC+1 (CET)
  - Summer (DST): UTC+2 (CEST)
- Postal code: 671 76
- Website: www.mestys-olbramovice.cz

Olbramovice (Czech pronunciation: [ˈolbramovɪtsɛ]; German: Wolframitz) is a market town in Znojmo District in the South Moravian Region of the Czech Republic. It has about 1,200 inhabitants.

== Geography ==
Olbramovice is located about 29 kilometres (18 mi) northeast of Znojmo and 27 km (17 mi) southwest of Brno. It lies mostly in a flat agricultural landscape in the Dyje–Svratka Valley, only the northwestern part of the municipal territory extends into the Bobrava Highlands. The highest point is at 342 m (1,122 ft) above sea level. The stream Olbramovický potok flows through the market town.

== History ==
The first written mention of Olbramovice is from 1063, when the village was listed as a property of the Olomouc bishopric. A fortress in Olbramovice was first documented in 1253. In 1436, Olbramovice was promoted to a market town. There were originally four settlements in the territory of today's Olbramovice, which gradually merged: Olbramovice, Babice, Lidměřice and Želovice. In 1947, they were administratively merged into one municipality.

== Demographics ==
Historical population

Year	Pop.	±%
1869	1,055	—
1880	1,167	+10.6%
1890	1,184	+1.5%
1900	1,112	−6.1%
1910	1,086	−2.3%

Year	Pop.	±%
1921	1,137	+4.7%
1930	1,098	−3.4%
1950	935	−14.8%
1961	919	−1.7%
1970	908	−1.2%

Year	Pop.	±%
1980	947	+4.3%
1991	1,000	+5.6%
2001	1,048	+4.8%
2011	1,064	+1.5%
2021	1,137	+6.9%

Source: Censuses

== Economy ==
Olbramovice is known for viticulture. It lies in the Znojemská wine subregion.

In the western part of the municipal territory is a stone quarry, owned by Heidelberg Materials.

== Transport ==
The railway line Brno–Hrušovany nad Jevišovkou passes through the municipal territory, but there is no train station. The municipality is served by the station in neighbouring Bohutice.

== Sights ==
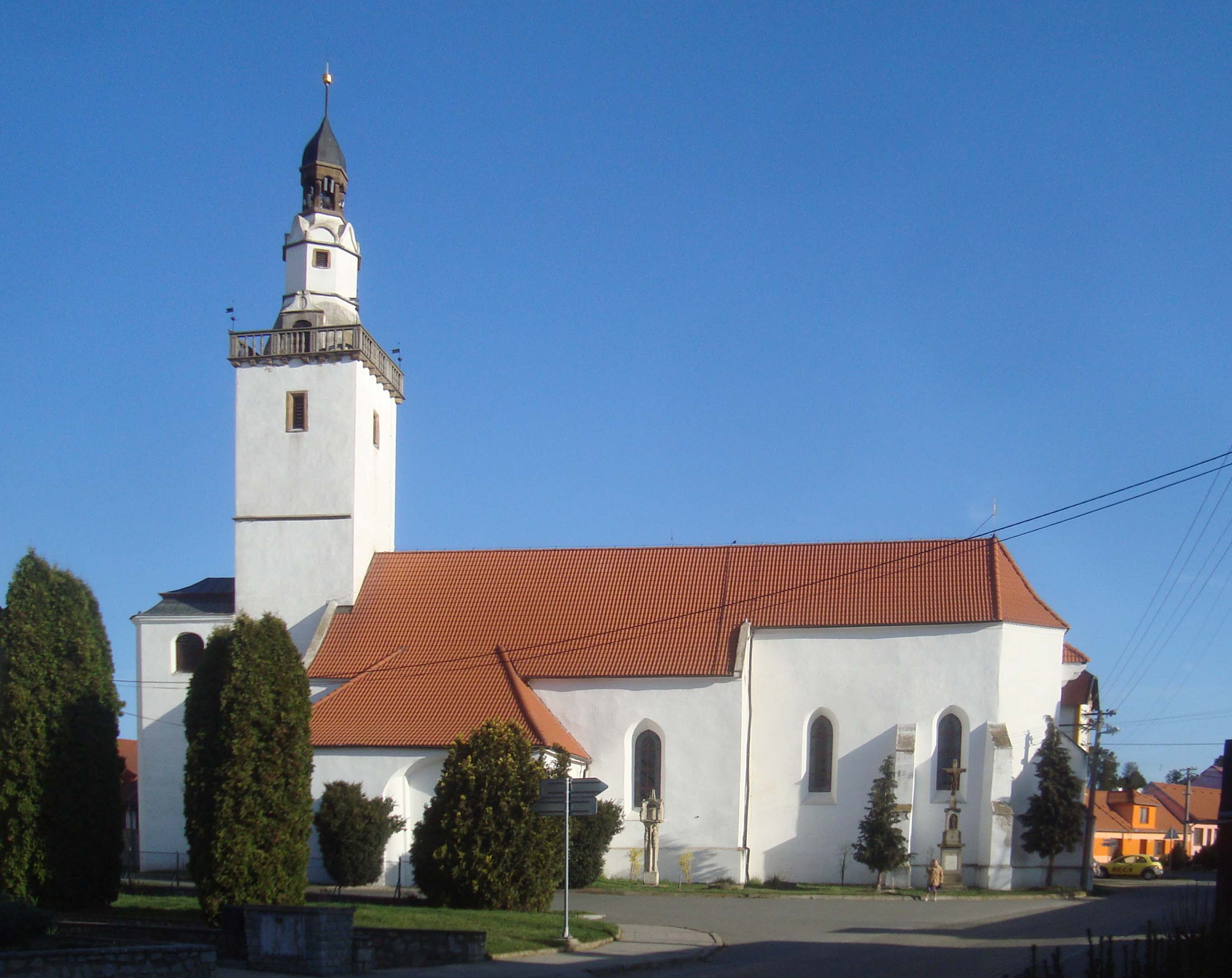
Church of Saint James the Great

The main landmark of Olbramovice is the Church of Saint James the Great. It was built in the late Gothic style in the 15th century and modified in the 16th century.

An architecturally valuable building is the town hall. It dates from the mid-16th century.

== Notable people ==
- Erhard Raus (1889–1956), German military leader
