= Vier Berge-Teucherner Land =

Coordinates: 51°07′N 12°01′E

Vier Berge-Teucherner Land was a Verwaltungsgemeinschaft ("collective municipality") in the district Burgenlandkreis in Saxony-Anhalt, Germany. It was situated south of Weißenfels. The seat of the Verwaltungsgemeinschaft was in Teuchern. It was disbanded in January 2011.

The Verwaltungsgemeinschaft Vier Berge-Teucherner Land consisted of the following municipalities:

1. Deuben
2. Gröben
3. Gröbitz
4. Krauschwitz
5. Nessa
6. Prittitz
7. Teuchern
8. Trebnitz
