= Burgenlandkreis (former district) =

Coordinates: 51°10′N 11°45′E

- District
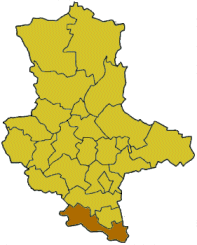
- Country: Germany
- State: Saxony-Anhalt
- Disbanded: 2007-07-01
- Capital: Naumburg

Area
  - Total: 1,040.91 km^{2} (401.90 sq mi)

Population (2000)
  - Total: 143,340
  - Density: 140/km^{2} (360/sq mi)
- Time zone: UTC+01:00 (CET)
  - Summer (DST): UTC+02:00 (CEST)
- Vehicle registration: BLK
- Website: burgenlandkreis.de

The Burgenlandkreis (German pronunciation: [ˈbʊʁɡn̩lantˌkʁaɪs]) was a district (Kreis) in the south of Saxony-Anhalt, Germany. Neighboring districts are (from north clockwise) Merseburg-Querfurt, Weißenfels, Leipziger Land, Aschersleben-Staßfurt, Altenburger Land, Greiz, district-free Gera, Saale-Holzland, Weimarer Land, Sömmerda and the Kyffhäuserkreis.

== History ==
The district was created in 1994 when the districts Naumburg, Nebra and Zeitz were merged.

== Geography ==
Main rivers in the district are the Saale and its affluent Unstrut, and also in the south of the district the White Elster. The highest elevation is the Seeligenbornberg (355 m), the lowest elevation is in the Saale valley near Gosek (97.8m).

== Coat of arms ==
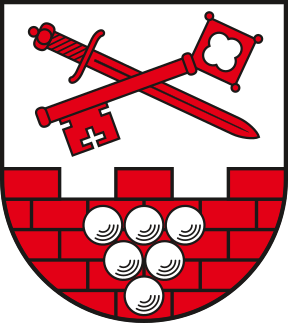
The coat of arms show a city wall in the bottom part, symbolizing the many castles in the district which also gave it its name. The six grapes symbolize the viticulture in the area around Freyburg, one of the northernmost wine areas of Europe. The sword and key in the top part are the symbols of St. Peter and Saint Paul, the patrons of the cathedrals in Naumburg and Zeitz. These two symbols were taken from the coat of arms of the Zeitz district when it was incorporated into the Burgenlandkreis.

== Towns and municipalities ==
Towns
1. Naumburg
Verwaltungsgemeinschaften
1. An der Finne (incl. towns Bad Bibra and Eckartsberga)
2. Bad Kösen (incl. town Bad Kösen)
3. Droyßiger-Zeitzer Forst
4. Unstruttal (incl. towns Freyburg, Laucha and Nebra)
5. Wethautal (incl. towns Osterfeld and Stößen)
6. Zeitzer Land (incl. town Zeitz)
Free municipalities
1. Elsteraue
