= Kruschwitz =

Kruschwitz may refer to:

- German name of Kruszwica, town in central Poland, Kuyavian-Pomeranian Voivodeship
  - Treaty of Kruschwitz (German: Vertrag von Kruschwitz)

== People with the surname ==
- Dr. Peter Kruschwitz
- Dr. Mitchel Linhart Kruschwitz

== See also ==
- Krauschwitz
- Krauschwitz, Saxony-Anhalt
