= Halle (region) =

Halle Regierungsbezirk Halle
- Regierungsbezirk
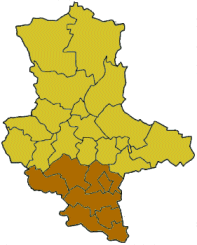
- Map of Saxony-Anhalt highlighting the former Regierungsbezirk of Halle
- Coordinates: 51.4667°N 11.9667°E
- Country: Germany
- State: Saxony-Anhalt
- Disestablished: 2004-01-01
- Region seat: Halle

Area
  - Total: 4,430 km^{2} (1,710 sq mi)

Population (1999)
  - Total: 876,132
  - Density: 198/km^{2} (512/sq mi)

Halle was one of the three Regierungsbezirke of Saxony-Anhalt, Germany, located in the south of the country.

== History ==
It was founded in 1952 while part of East Germany. Becoming effective on January 1, 2004, the Regierungsbezirk was disbanded. Its functions were taken over by the Landesverwaltungsamt, which has three offices at the former seats of the Bezirksregierungen.

== Subdivisions ==
Kreise
(districts)
- Burgenlandkreis
- Mansfelder Land
- Merseburg-Querfurt
- Saalkreis
- Sangerhausen
- Weißenfels
Kreisfreie Städte
(district-free towns)
- Halle

== See also ==
- Bezirk Halle
