= Schellbach =

- Ortsteil of Gutenborn
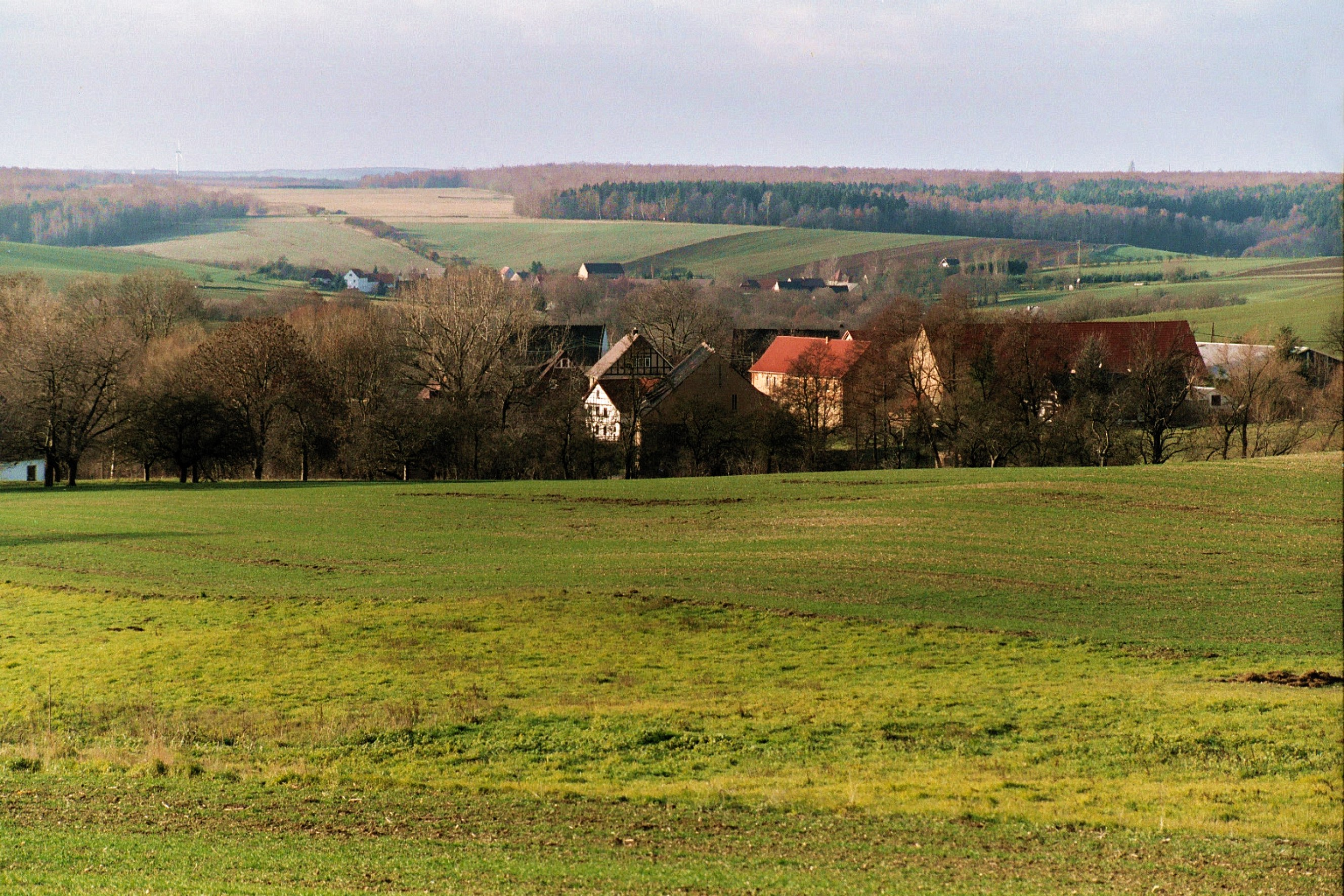
- Interactive map of Schellbach
- Location within Germany Location within Saxony-Anhalt
- Coordinates: 50°58′38″N 12°7′3″E
- Country: Germany
- State: Saxony-Anhalt
- District: Burgenlandkreis
- Municipality: Gutenborn

Area
  - Total: 10.39 km^{2} (4.01 sq mi)
- Elevation: 277 m (909 ft)

Population (2006-12-31)
  - Total: 511
  - Density: 49.2/km^{2} (127/sq mi)
- Time zone: UTC+01:00 (CET)
  - Summer (DST): UTC+02:00 (CEST)
- Postal codes: 06712
- Dialling codes: 034423
- Vehicle registration: BLK
- Website: www.vgem-dzf.de

Schellbach is a village and a former municipality in the Burgenlandkreis district, in Saxony-Anhalt, Germany.

Since 1 January 2010, it is part of the municipality Gutenborn.
