= Heidegrund =

- Stadtteil of Osterfeld
- Interactive map of Heidegrund
- Location within Germany Location within Saxony-Anhalt
- Coordinates: 51°2′N 12°0′E
- Country: Germany
- State: Saxony-Anhalt
- District: Burgenlandkreis
- Town: Osterfeld

Area
  - Total: 9.88 km^{2} (3.81 sq mi)
- Elevation: 289 m (948 ft)

Population (2006-12-31)
  - Total: 672
  - Density: 68.0/km^{2} (176/sq mi)
- Time zone: UTC+01:00 (CET)
  - Summer (DST): UTC+02:00 (CEST)
- Postal codes: 06722
- Dialling codes: 034422

Heidegrund is a village and a former municipality in the Burgenlandkreis district, in Saxony-Anhalt, Germany.

Since 1 January 2010, it is part of the town Osterfeld.
