= Weißenborn, Saxony-Anhalt =

Weißenborn
- Ortsteil of Droyßig
- Interactive map of Weißenborn
- Location within Germany Location within Saxony-Anhalt
- Coordinates: 51°2′N 12°0′E
- Country: Germany
- State: Saxony-Anhalt
- District: Burgenlandkreis
- Municipality: Droyßig

Area
  - Total: 9.55 km^{2} (3.69 sq mi)
- Elevation: 278 m (912 ft)

Population (2008)
  - Total: 363
  - Density: 38.0/km^{2} (98.4/sq mi)
- Time zone: UTC+01:00 (CET)
  - Summer (DST): UTC+02:00 (CEST)
- Postal codes: 06722
- Dialling codes: 034425

Weißenborn (German pronunciation: [ˈvaɪsn̩bɔʁn]) is a village and a former municipality in the Burgenlandkreis district, in Saxony-Anhalt, Germany. Since 1 January 2010, it is part of the municipality Droyßig.
