= Edward Dalby =

English judge (c.1615–1672)

Edward Dalby (c. 1616/1615 – 30 March 1672) was a Recorder of Reading.

Dalby is buried in the graveyard of St. Laurence Church, Reading, where his gravestone, translated from the Latin by Peter Kruschwitz, reads:

"In the hope of resurrection, here are deposited the ashes of Edward Dalby, armiger, who died 30th March, AD 1672, aged 56. Also of Frances, his wife, surviving daughter and heir of Charles Holloway, serjeant-at-law: she died on 17th of August, AD 1717, aged 90. Also of Elizabeth, their daughter, who died on 8th of February, A.D. 1686, aged 23."
