= Kahlwinkel =

- Ortsteil of Finneland
- Interactive map of Kahlwinkel
- Location within Germany Location within Saxony-Anhalt
- Coordinates: 51°13′N 11°29′E
- Country: Germany
- State: Saxony-Anhalt
- District: Burgenlandkreis
- Town: Finneland

Area
  - Total: 6.80 km^{2} (2.63 sq mi)
- Elevation: 274 m (899 ft)

Population (2006-12-31)
  - Total: 358
  - Density: 52.6/km^{2} (136/sq mi)
- Time zone: UTC+01:00 (CET)
  - Summer (DST): UTC+02:00 (CEST)
- Postal codes: 06647
- Dialling codes: 034465

Kahlwinkel is a village and a former municipality in the Burgenlandkreis district, in Saxony-Anhalt, Germany. Since 1 July 2009, it is part of the municipality Finneland.
