= Waldau (Osterfeld) =

- Stadtteil of Osterfeld
- Interactive map of Waldau
- Location within Germany Location within Saxony-Anhalt
- Coordinates: 51°4′N 11°56′E
- Country: Germany
- State: Saxony-Anhalt
- District: Burgenlandkreis
- Town: Osterfeld

Area
  - Total: 5.55 km^{2} (2.14 sq mi)
- Elevation: 250 m (820 ft)

Population (2008)
  - Total: 492
  - Density: 88.6/km^{2} (230/sq mi)
- Time zone: UTC+01:00 (CET)
  - Summer (DST): UTC+02:00 (CEST)
- Postal codes: 06721
- Dialling codes: 034422

Waldau is a village and a former municipality in the Burgenlandkreis district, in Saxony-Anhalt, Germany.

Since 1 January 2010, it is part of the town Osterfeld.
