= Gieckau =

- Ortsteil of Wethau
- Interactive map of Gieckau
- Location within Germany Location within Saxony-Anhalt
- Coordinates: 51°08′N 11°53′E
- Country: Germany
- State: Saxony-Anhalt
- District: Burgenlandkreis
- Municipality: Wethau

Area
  - Total: 3.23 km^{2} (1.25 sq mi)
- Elevation: 174 m (571 ft)

Population (2006-12-31)
  - Total: 343
  - Density: 106/km^{2} (275/sq mi)
- Time zone: UTC+01:00 (CET)
  - Summer (DST): UTC+02:00 (CEST)
- Postal codes: 06618
- Dialling codes: 034445
- Website: www.vgem-wethautal.de

Gieckau is a village and a former municipality in the Burgenlandkreis district, in Saxony-Anhalt, Germany. Since 1 January 2010, it is part of the municipality Wethau.
