= Taugwitz =

- Ortsteil of Lanitz-Hassel-Tal
- Interactive map of Taugwitz
- Location within Germany Location within Saxony-Anhalt
- Coordinates: 51°7′N 11°38′E
- Country: Germany
- State: Saxony-Anhalt
- District: Burgenlandkreis
- Town: Lanitz-Hassel-Tal

Area
  - Total: 10.00 km^{2} (3.86 sq mi)
- Elevation: 216 m (709 ft)

Population (2006-12-31)
  - Total: 914
  - Density: 91.4/km^{2} (237/sq mi)
- Time zone: UTC+01:00 (CET)
  - Summer (DST): UTC+02:00 (CEST)
- Postal codes: 06628
- Dialling codes: 034463

Taugwitz is a village and a former municipality in the Burgenlandkreis district, in Saxony-Anhalt, Germany. Since 1 July 2009, it is part of the municipality Lanitz-Hassel-Tal.
