= Droßdorf =

- Ortsteil of Gutenborn
- Interactive map of Droßdorf
- Location within Germany Location within Saxony-Anhalt
- Coordinates: 51°0′N 12°7′E
- Country: Germany
- State: Saxony-Anhalt
- District: Burgenlandkreis
- Municipality: Gutenborn

Area
  - Total: 10.36 km^{2} (4.00 sq mi)
- Elevation: 270 m (890 ft)

Population (2006-12-31)
  - Total: 691
  - Density: 66.7/km^{2} (173/sq mi)
- Time zone: UTC+01:00 (CET)
  - Summer (DST): UTC+02:00 (CEST)
- Postal codes: 06712
- Dialling codes: 03441
- Website: www.vgem-dzf.de

Droßdorf is a village and a former municipality in the Burgenlandkreis district, in Saxony-Anhalt, Germany.

Since 1 January 2010, it is part of the municipality Gutenborn.
