= Kritzinger =

Kritzinger is a surname. Notable people with the surname include:

- Friedrich Wilhelm Kritzinger (1816–1890) German theologian, teacher and songwriter
- Friedrich Wilhelm Kritzinger (1890–1947), German official
- Klippies Kritzinger (1948–2016), South African rugby union player
- Pieter Hendrik Kritzinger (1870–1930), South African general
- Wessel Kritzinger (born 1944), South African Army general
