= Goldschau =

- Stadtteil of Osterfeld
- Coat of arms
- Interactive map of Goldschau
- Location within Germany Location within Saxony-Anhalt
- Coordinates: 51°4′N 11°54′E
- Country: Germany
- State: Saxony-Anhalt
- District: Burgenlandkreis
- Town: Osterfeld

Area
  - Total: 5.11 km^{2} (1.97 sq mi)
- Elevation: 244 m (801 ft)

Population (2006-12-31)
  - Total: 317
  - Density: 62.0/km^{2} (161/sq mi)
- Time zone: UTC+01:00 (CET)
  - Summer (DST): UTC+02:00 (CEST)
- Postal codes: 06721
- Dialling codes: 034422
- Website: www.vgem-wethautal.de

Goldschau is a village and a former municipality in the Burgenlandkreis district, in Saxony-Anhalt, Germany. Since 1 January 2010, it is part of the town Osterfeld.
