= Pretzsch =

Pretzsch may refer to:

- Pretzsch, Burgenlandkreis, a former municipality in the Burgenlandkreis in Saxony-Anhalt, Germany
- Pretzsch, Wittenberg, a former municipality in the Wittenberg district in Saxony-Anhalt, Germany
