= Steinburg, Saxony-Anhalt =

Steinburg
- Ortsteil of Finneland
- Interactive map of Steinburg
- Location within Germany Location within Saxony-Anhalt
- Coordinates: 51°11′N 11°31′E
- Country: Germany
- State: Saxony-Anhalt
- District: Burgenlandkreis
- Town: Finneland

Area
  - Total: 9.62 km^{2} (3.71 sq mi)
- Elevation: 209 m (686 ft)

Population (2012)
  - Total: 101
  - Density: 10.5/km^{2} (27.2/sq mi)
- Time zone: UTC+01:00 (CET)
  - Summer (DST): UTC+02:00 (CEST)
- Postal codes: 06647
- Dialling codes: 034465

Steinburg is a village and a former municipality in the Burgenlandkreis district, in Saxony-Anhalt, Germany. Since 1 July 2009, it is part of the municipality Finneland.
