= Unterkaka =

- Ortsteil of Meineweh
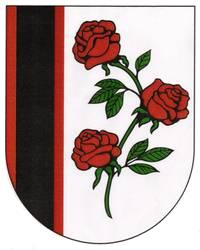
- Coat of arms
- Interactive map of Unterkaka
- Location within Germany Location within Saxony-Anhalt
- Coordinates: 51°5′26″N 11°58′4″E
- Country: Germany
- State: Saxony-Anhalt
- District: Burgenlandkreis
- Municipality: Meineweh

Area
  - Total: 7.07 km^{2} (2.73 sq mi)
- Elevation: 263 m (863 ft)

Population (2006-12-31)
  - Total: 308
  - Density: 43.6/km^{2} (113/sq mi)
- Time zone: UTC+01:00 (CET)
  - Summer (DST): UTC+02:00 (CEST)
- Postal codes: 06721
- Dialling codes: 034422
- Vehicle registration: BLK
- Website: www.gemeinde-unterkaka.de

Unterkaka is a village and a former municipality in the Burgenlandkreis district, in Saxony-Anhalt, Germany.

Since 1 January 2010, it is part of the municipality Meineweh.
