= Süßer die Glocken nie klingen =

German Christmas carol

- Christmas carol
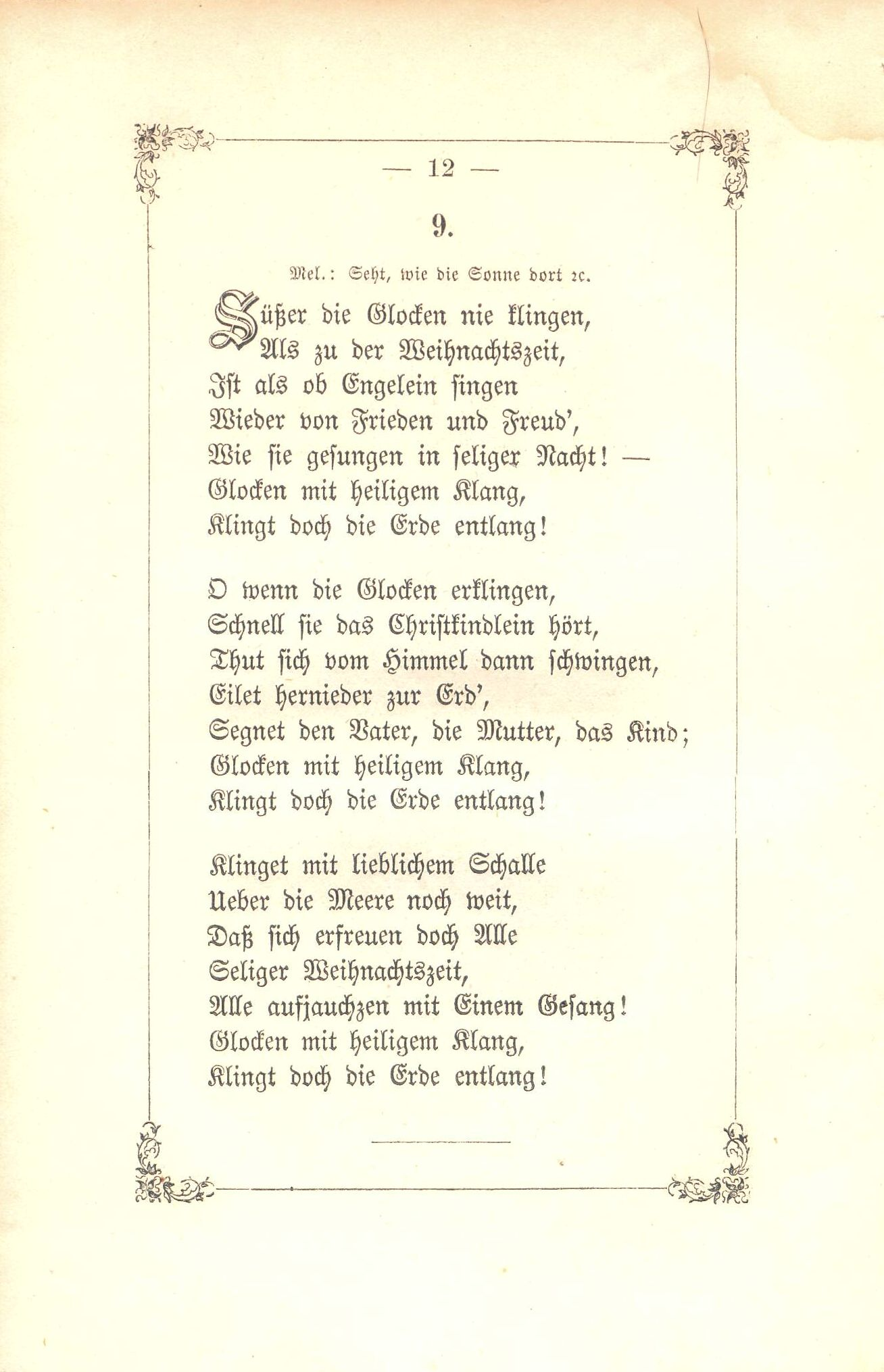
- Text in Weihnachtsbüchlein für Schule und Haus (1866)
- Text: by Friedrich Wilhelm Kritzinger
- Language: German
- Melody: "Seht, wie die Sonne dort sinket"
- Published: 1860

"Süßer die Glocken nie klingen" (Sweeter the bells never sound) is a popular German Christmas carol with text by Friedrich Wilhelm Kritzinger to a traditional Volkslied melody, first printed in 1860. It has remained popular and is part of many song books and Christmas recordings, evoking the sound of bells as a symbol of peace and joy.

== History ==
The theologian and pedagogue Friedrich Wilhelm Kritzinger wrote the text when he was the director of a seminary for women teachers in Droyßig, matching a well-known Volkslied melody, of the evening song "Seht, wie die Sonne dort sinket" (Look how the sun is setting there)", which was documented in Thuringia from 1841 and in Silesia from 1847. It was first printed in 1860 in the collection Liederstrauß (Song bouquet) by Bernhard Brähmig, who was a music teacher at the teachers' school.

Some historians assume that "Seht, wie die Sonne dort sinket" was written before 1826. Karl Kummerel (1822–1857) paraphrased the text in 1847, and is therefore sometimes credited as the author. The popular art song "Dort sinket die Sonne im Westen" is regarded as a source for "Seht, wie die Sonne dort sinket", with a text by Ernst Heinrich Schwabe (1787–1818), a teacher from Zittau, to which August Harder published a melody 1808, different from "Seht, wie die Sonne dort sinket". The melody of "Seht, wie die Sonne dort sinket" was popular in several variants, including "Das Liebchen im Grabe". Some of the earlier songs mention bells, which may have inspired Kritzinger.

From the late 1890s, the song has appeared frequently in song books. The song establishes a pleasant mood in hope for peace and joy.

== Text and music ==
"Süßer die Glocken nie klingen"
Höxter Glockenspiel

The following text is Kritzinger's original:

Süßer die Glocken nie klingen,
Als zu der Weihnachtszeit,
Ist, als ob Engelein singen
Wieder von Frieden und Freud',
𝄆 Wie sie gesungen in seliger Nacht! 𝄇
Glocken mit heiligem Klang,
Klingt doch die Erde entlang!

O wenn die Glocken erklingen,
Schnell sie das Christkindlein hört:
Thut sich vom Himmel dann schwingen,
Eilet hernieder zur Erd'.
𝄆 Segnet den Vater, die Mutter, das Kind; 𝄇
Glocken mit heiligem Klang,
Klingt doch die Erde entlang!

Klinget mit lieblichem Schalle
Ueber die Meere noch weit,
Daß sich erfreuen doch Alle
Seliger Weihnachtszeit,
𝄆 Alle aufjauchzen mit einem Gesang! 𝄇
Glocken mit heiligem Klang,
Klingt doch die Erde entlang!

Sweeter the bells never sound
Than at Christmas time
It's as if angels are singing
Again of peace and joy
𝄆 As they sang on the blessed night 𝄇
Bells with a holy sound
The earth rings in harmony!

Oh, when the bells ring out
Quickly the Christ Child hears them
Then swings down from heaven
Hurries down to earth
𝄆 Blesses the father, the mother, the child 𝄇
Bells with a holy sound
The earth rings in harmony!

Ring with lovely sounds
Very far over the seas
So that all may rejoice
In the blessed Christmas time
𝄆 All shout out in glorious song 𝄇
Bells with a holy sound
The earth rings in harmony!

== Recordings ==
"Süßer die Glocken nie klingen" has been included in many collections of Christmas carols, by popular singers including Peter Alexander, Rondò Veneziano, Roy Black, Helene Fischer, Heintje, Vicky Leandros, Ivan Rebroff, Die Flippers, Nana Mouskouri and Roger Whittaker.

== See also ==
- List of Christmas carols
