= Möllern =

- Ortsteil of Lanitz-Hassel-Tal
- Interactive map of Möllern
- Location within Germany Location within Saxony-Anhalt
- Coordinates: 51°09′N 11°42′E
- Country: Germany
- State: Saxony-Anhalt
- District: Burgenlandkreis
- Town: Lanitz-Hassel-Tal

Area
  - Total: 12.45 km^{2} (4.81 sq mi)
- Elevation: 230 m (750 ft)

Population (2006-12-31)
  - Total: 363
  - Density: 29.2/km^{2} (75.5/sq mi)
- Time zone: UTC+01:00 (CET)
  - Summer (DST): UTC+02:00 (CEST)
- Postal codes: 06628
- Dialling codes: 034463

Möllern is a village and a former municipality in the Burgenlandkreis district, in Saxony-Anhalt, Germany. Since 1 July 2009, it is part of the municipality Lanitz-Hassel-Tal.
