= Grana, Germany =

Grana
- Ortsteil of Kretzschau
- Interactive map of Grana
- Location within Germany Location within Saxony-Anhalt
- Coordinates: 51°3′N 12°7′E
- Country: Germany
- State: Saxony-Anhalt
- District: Burgenlandkreis
- Municipality: Kretzschau

Area
  - Total: 7.99 km^{2} (3.08 sq mi)
- Elevation: 174 m (571 ft)

Population (2006-12-31)
  - Total: 755
  - Density: 94.5/km^{2} (245/sq mi)
- Time zone: UTC+01:00 (CET)
  - Summer (DST): UTC+02:00 (CEST)
- Postal codes: 06712
- Dialling codes: 03441
- Website: www.vgem-dzf.de

Grana is a village and a former municipality in the Burgenlandkreis district, in Saxony-Anhalt, Germany. Since 1 January 2010, it is part of the municipality Kretzschau.

== People ==
- Johann Friedrich Winckler (1856-1943), politician, member of Reichstag DNVP
