= Bergisdorf =

- Ortsteil of Gutenborn
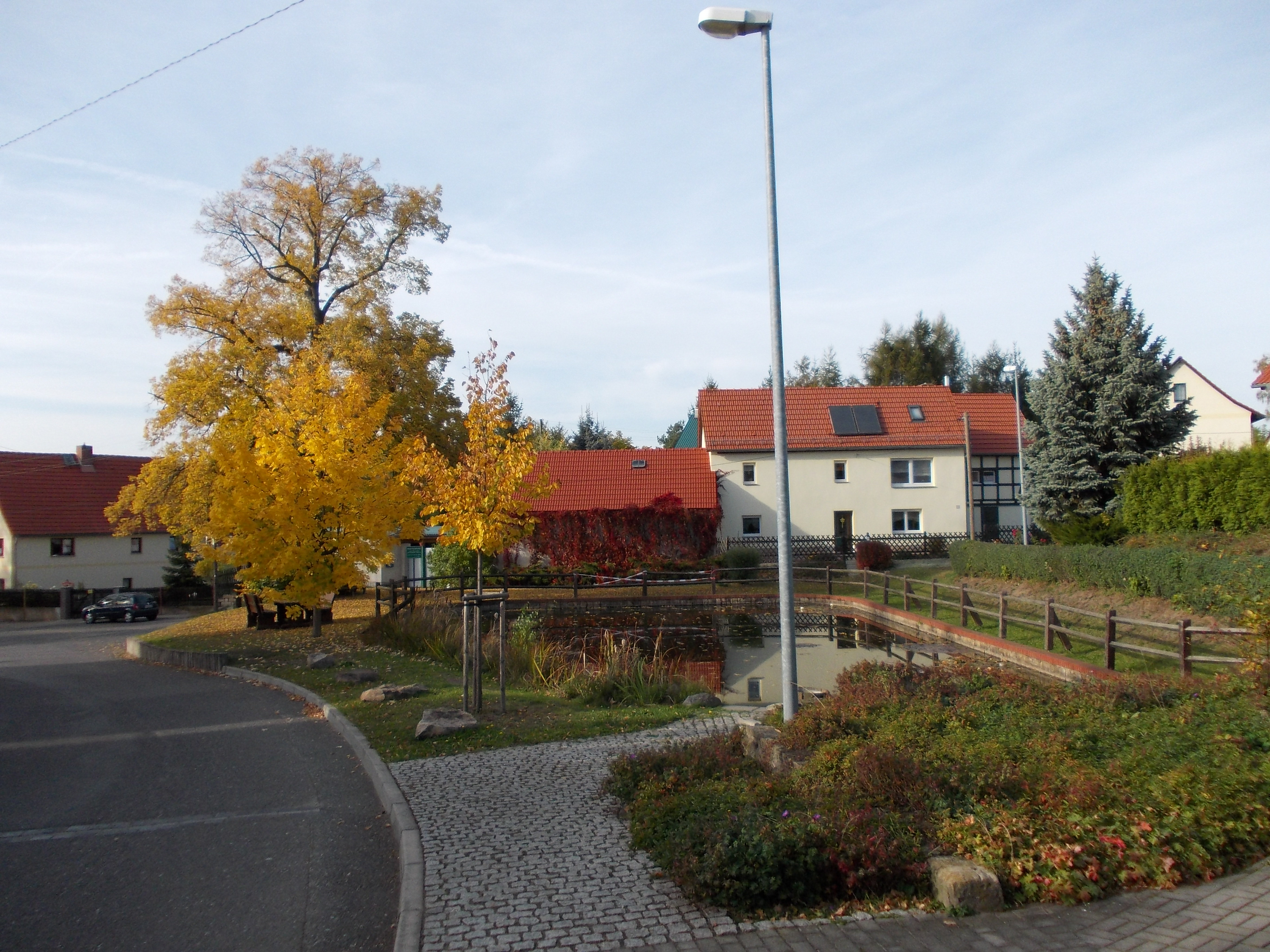
- A pond in Bergisdorf
- Interactive map of Bergisdorf
- Location within Germany Location within Saxony-Anhalt
- Coordinates: 51°01′55″N 12°07′05″E
- Country: Germany
- State: Saxony-Anhalt
- District: Burgenlandkreis
- Municipality: Gutenborn

Area
  - Total: 6.63 km^{2} (2.56 sq mi)
- Elevation: 235 m (771 ft)

Population (2006-12-31)
  - Total: 412
  - Density: 62.1/km^{2} (161/sq mi)
- Time zone: UTC+01:00 (CET)
  - Summer (DST): UTC+02:00 (CEST)
- Postal codes: 06712
- Dialling codes: 03441
- Vehicle registration: BLK
- Website: www.vgem-dzf.de

Bergisdorf is a village and a former municipality in the Burgenlandkreis district, in Saxony-Anhalt, Germany. Since 1 January 2010, it is part of the municipality Gutenborn.
