= Heuckewalde =

- Ortsteil of Gutenborn
- Interactive map of Heuckewalde
- Location within Germany Location within Saxony-Anhalt
- Coordinates: 50°58′N 12°10′E
- Country: Germany
- State: Saxony-Anhalt
- District: Burgenlandkreis
- Municipality: Gutenborn

Area
  - Total: 6.55 km^{2} (2.53 sq mi)
- Elevation: 285 m (935 ft)

Population (2006-12-31)
  - Total: 441
  - Density: 67.3/km^{2} (174/sq mi)
- Time zone: UTC+01:00 (CET)
  - Summer (DST): UTC+02:00 (CEST)
- Postal codes: 06712
- Dialling codes: 034423
- Website: www.vgem-dzf.de

Heuckewalde is a village and a former municipality in the Burgenlandkreis district, in Saxony-Anhalt, Germany.

Since 1 January 2010, it has been part of the Gutenborn municipality.
