= Theobald Fischer =

German geographer

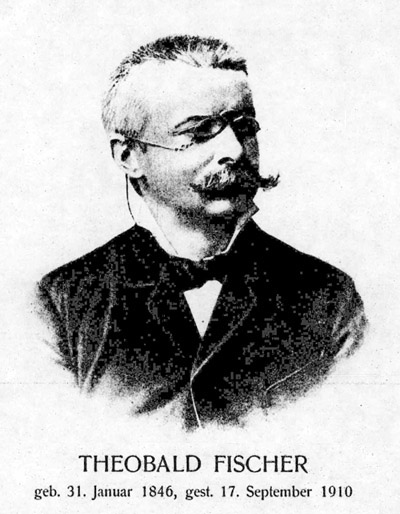
Theobald Fischer.

Theobald Fischer (31 January 1846 Kirchsteitz – 17 September 1910) was a German geographer.

== Biography ==
He was educated at the universities of Heidelberg, Halle, Bonn and Vienna and at first devoted himself to history. A traveling tutorship directed his attention to geography, and he visited many parts of Europe in the pursuit of this study, but especially the Mediterranean lands, including North Africa (Atlas lands), e.g. the Tunisian Sahara (1886), Morocco and Algeria (1888). The “Mediterranean region,” an example in the study of regional geography, is a conception the world owes to Fischer: his thesis for the rank of Privatdozent in the University of Bonn (1876) was entitled Beiträge zur physischen Geographie der Mittelmeerländer (Contributions to the physical geography of the lands of the Mediterranean), and his most important publications are a collection of Mittelmeerbilder (Mediterranean pictures) and his work on the Mediterranean peninsulas of Europe in Alfred Kirchhoff's Allgemeine Länderkunde.

He held professorships of geography at the University of Kiel (1879-1883) and at University of Marburg from 1883 until his death. In addition to numerous contributions to scientific periodicals, and the works mentioned above, he also published Raccolta dei mappemondi e carte nautiche del XIII. al XVI. secolo (10 atlases, containing 79 leaves, 1881).

== Notes ==
This article incorporates text from 1922 Encyclopædia Britannica, a publication from 1922, now in the public domain in the United States.

- Chisholm, Hugh, ed. (1922). "Fischer, Theobald" . Encyclopædia Britannica (12th ed.). London & New York: The Encyclopædia Britannica Company.
- Gilman, D. C.; Peck, H. T.; Colby, F. M., eds. (1905). "Fischer, Theobald" . New International Encyclopedia (1st ed.). New York: Dodd, Mead.
- Balkanologie Footnote [10] gives a very complete citation of Fischer's contribution to Kirchoff's work (visited 26 October 2010).
