= Breitenbach, Burgenlandkreis =

Breitenbach
- Ortsteil of Wetterzeube
- Interactive map of Breitenbach
- Location within Germany Location within Saxony-Anhalt
- Coordinates: 51°0′N 12°4′E
- Country: Germany
- State: Saxony-Anhalt
- District: Burgenlandkreis
- Municipality: Wetterzeube

Area
  - Total: 19.39 km^{2} (7.49 sq mi)
- Elevation: 262 m (860 ft)

Population (2006-12-31)
  - Total: 343
  - Density: 17.7/km^{2} (45.8/sq mi)
- Time zone: UTC+01:00 (CET)
  - Summer (DST): UTC+02:00 (CEST)
- Postal codes: 06712
- Dialling codes: 034425
- Website: www.vgem-dzf.de

Breitenbach (German pronunciation: [ˈbʁaɪtn̩bax]) is a village and a former municipality in the Burgenlandkreis district, in Saxony-Anhalt, Germany. Since 1 January 2010, it is part of the municipality Wetterzeube. An archaeological site dating to the Upper Palaeolithic was discovered near Breitenbach in 1925.
