= Haynsburg =

- Ortsteil of Wetterzeube
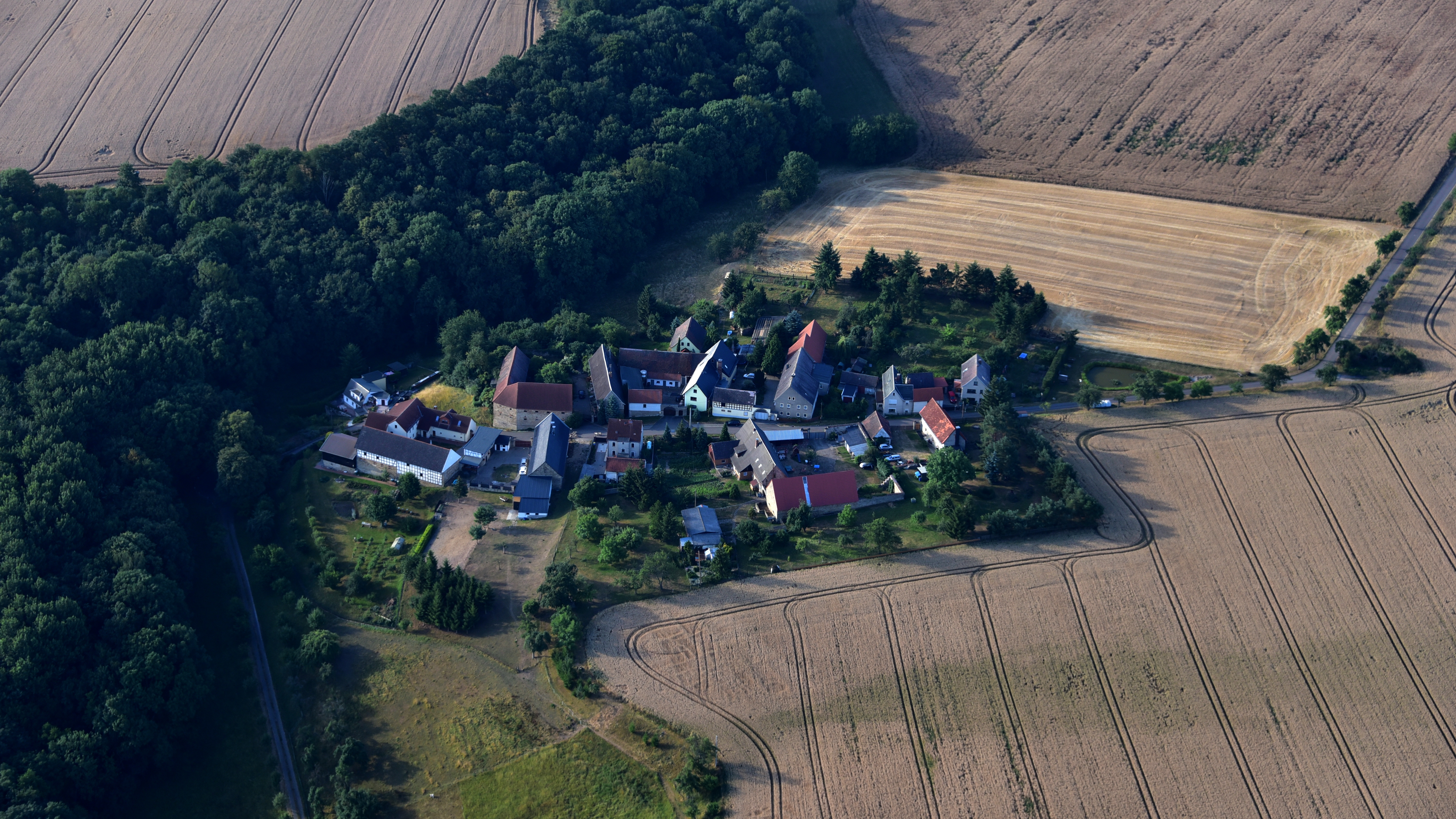
- Interactive map of Haynsburg
- Location within Germany Location within Saxony-Anhalt
- Coordinates: 51°1′N 12°4′E
- Country: Germany
- State: Saxony-Anhalt
- District: Burgenlandkreis
- Municipality: Wetterzeube

Area
  - Total: 7.97 km^{2} (3.08 sq mi)
- Elevation: 216 m (709 ft)

Population (2006-12-31)
  - Total: 547
  - Density: 68.6/km^{2} (178/sq mi)
- Time zone: UTC+01:00 (CET)
  - Summer (DST): UTC+02:00 (CEST)
- Postal codes: 06712
- Dialling codes: 034425
- Website: www.vgem-dzf.de

Haynsburg is a village and a former municipality in the Burgenlandkreis district, in Saxony-Anhalt, Germany. Since 1 January 2010, it is part of the municipality Wetterzeube.
