= Breitenbach (archaeological site) =

Archaeological site near Saxony-Anhalt, Germany

Breitenbach archaeological site
- Location within Germany
- 51°00′28″N 12°05′06″E
- Type: Settlement
- Periods: Upper Paleolithic, Neolithic
- Cultures: Aurignacian, Linear Pottery culture
- Location: Breitenbach, Saxony-Anhalt, Germany

Site notes
- Area: Between 8,000 m^{2} (86,000 sq ft) and 10,000 m^{2} (110,000 sq ft)
- Excavation dates: 1925, 1927, 1962, 2004, 2009–present

The archaeological site near the village of Breitenbach in Saxony-Anhalt, Germany is an important open-air settlement that dates to the period of initial colonization of Europe by anatomically modern humans. The occupations date to the early Upper Palaeolithic and more specifically belong to the Aurignacian cultural complex. Breitenbach is currently the biggest open-air settlement site in western Eurasia dating to this time period. Overlying the Palaleolithic deposits are the remains of a younger settlement that has been dated to the Neolithic.

== Palaeolithic settlement ==
=== Significance ===
The open-air site Breitenbach is located at the northern boundary of the Aurignacian oikumene, from which only few sites are currently known. It is also one of the few Aurignacian open-air sites known from Central Europe – knowledge about modern human spatial behaviour and subsistence practices during the Aurignacian derives primarily from cave sites. The extent of the settlement is estimated between 8,000 and 10,000 square meters – this is very unusual for this period and foreshadows the large open-air settlements of the Gravettian known from eastern Europe. As a late representative of the Aurignacian, Breitenbach is of supra-regional interest in understanding the dynamics of the Aurignacian-Gravettian transition. It also promises insight to spatial organisation and subsistence practices of hunter-gatherer groups during the time of the initial occurrence of the “complete set” of behaviourally modern characteristics.

=== Location ===
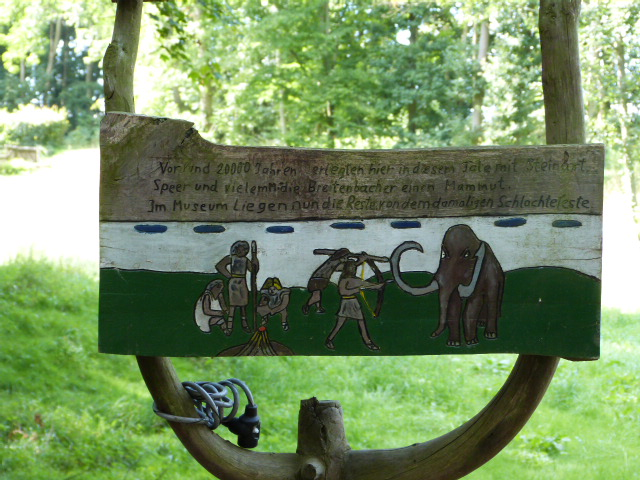
Local signpost near the archaeological site. It reads: Approximately 20,000 years ago in this valley, ancient Breitenbachers killed a mammoth using spear and axe. The leftovers of the meal are now stored in a museum. Note: the information is factually incorrect (see article below).

The village Breitenbach is part of Wetterzeube municipality and is located approximately 6 km south of the town of Zeitz. The archaeological site near the old cutting mill (“Schneidemühle”) is situated along the eastern bank of the river Aga, a small tributary of the White Elster river. The site is located on the slopes of a gentle promontory that, coming from a north-westerly direction peters out in a south-easterly direction.

=== Discovery and excavations ===
The site was discovered in the spring of 1925 by the local school teacher E. Thiersch. In the process of extending an existing storage yard adjacent to the mill, large numbers of bones had already been discovered and discarded since the autumn of 1924. First sondages by H. Hess von Wichdorff and A. Götze took place in 1925 and large scale archaeological excavations exposing 400 square meters were conducted by N. Niklasson and F. Wiegers in 1927. Unusual for the time, Niklasson and Wiegers employed a grid system, which allows for a reconstruction of the horizontal find distribution. A smaller geological sondage took place in 1962, followed by a small archaeological campaign in 2004. Since 2009 a collaborative effort headed by the MONREPOS Archaeological Research Center and Museum for Human Behavioral Evolution of the Römisch-Germanisches Zentralmuseum Mainz, the State Office for Heritage Management and Archaeology of Saxony-Anhalt and Leiden University has resumed large scale excavations.

=== Chronometric dates ===
Several 14C dates (AMS) place the occupations at Breitenbach between 23,990±180 (OxA-11964) and 28,380±170 (OxA-11889) years ago. Using the calpal software, these dates translate into 26,883±401 to 30,824±338 calendar years ago. This renders Breitenbach a very late representative of the Aurignacian tradition, as the Gravettian is well represented in Central and Eastern Europe at this time (see above).

=== Site organization and structures ===
At Breitenbach there is evidence for spatially differentiated activity zones, with foci of specific activities. This is suggested by the presence of large stone manuports, imported and intentionally arranged sandstone slabs, pits and hearths. The sandstone slabs in particular hint at repeated longer-term occupations. Four high-lithic concentrations were tentatively labelled as “lithic workshops”. Burned bone and lithics occur in large numbers. The find horizon is well-pronounced and appears quite distinct from the over/underlying layers. These characteristics suggest a repeated, more permanent settlement behaviour that hitherto was only known from the Gravettian.

=== Finds ===
Aurignacian artefact production is characterised by an increasing inclusion of bone and antler as raw materials and also the production of non-utilitarian objects. The Breitenbach lithic inventory (n=737) is made exclusively of Baltic flint and shows a high prevalence of keeled, simple and nosed scrapers, as well as various types of burins. In addition to the lithic implements a small number of worked bone tools, as well as non-utilitarian objects in the form of several perforated Arctic fox canines, an incised rib fragment and a piece of worked ivory have also been described.

=== Faunal remains ===
Since well-preserved faunal remains from Aurignacian open-air sites are rare, the relatively good preservation of the faunal materials is noteworthy. Together with the open-air site Lommersum, Breitenbach is the only Aurignacian open-air site in northern Central Europe known to have a faunal inventory. The Breitenbach faunal remains have to date only been partially described and are currently undergoing more detailed analysis. The site is primarily known for its mammoth remains, which initially alerted Thiersch to the presence of an archaeological site. Also occurring in numbers at the site are the remains of horse, reindeer and to a lesser extent those of woolly rhinoceros, hyena, wolf, lion, Arctic fox and Arctic hare.

== Neolithic settlement ==
A Neolithic settlement, belonging to the Linear Pottery Culture (c. between 7.500–5.500 years ago) overlying the Palaeolithic layer was first recognized during geological sondages by Hess von Wichdorff in 1927(3). He noted surface finds and the outlines of several living structures. During the course of the investigation, large numbers of pottery shards and several lithic axes were recovered. The Neolithic settlement is currently excavated by the State Office for Heritage Management and Archaeology Saxony-Anhalt.

== Literature ==
- Groiß, J.T. 1987. Fossilfunde aus dem Aurignacien von Breitenbach, Kreis Zeitz, Bez. Halle. Quartär 37/38: 97–100.
- Grünberg, J. 2006. New AMS Dates for Palaeolithic and Mesolithic Camp Sites and Single Finds in Saxony-Anhalt and Thuringia (Germany). Proc. Prehist. Soc. 72: 95–112.
- Von Wichdorff, H. H. 1932. Ein bedeutsames geologischvorgeschichtliches Profil im Bereich der paläolithischen Freilandstation an der Schneidemühle bei Zeitz (Prov. Sachsen). Mannus 24: 60–463.
- Jöris, O. & L. Morau. 2010. Vom Ende des Aurignacien – zur chronologischen Stellung des Freilandfundplatzes Breitenbach (Burgenlandkr.) im Kontext des Frühen und Mittleren Jungpaläolithikums in Mitteleuropa. Archäologisches Korrespondenzblatt 40: 1–20.
- Moreau, L. 2012. The Aurignacian of Breitenbach (Sachsen-Anhalt, Germany): The state of flake production. In: Pastoors, A and M Peresani (eds) Flakes not Blades - The role of flake production at the onset of the Upper Palaeolithic. Wissenschaftliche Schriften des Neandertal Museums 5: 181-197.
- Niklasson, N. 1928. Die paläolithische Station bei der Schneidemühle bei Breitenbach im Kreise Zeitz. Tagungsber. Dt. Anthr. Ges. Köln 49, 1927:89–90.
- Porr, M. 2004. Menschen wie wir. Die Aurignacien-Fundstelle von Breitenbach. In: H. Meller (Hrsg.), Paläolithikum und Mesolithikum. Kataloge zur Dauerausstellung im Landesmuseum. Halle.
- Richter, J. 1987. Jungpaläolithische Funde aus Breitenbach/Kr. Zeitz im Germanischen Nationalmuseum Nürnberg. Quartär 37/38: 63–96.
- Street, M & T. Terberger. 2003. New Evidence for the Chronology of the Aurignacian and the Question of Pleniglacial Settlement in Western Central Europe. In: F. d’Errico /J. Zilhao (eds.), The Chronology of the Aurignacian and of the Transitional Technocomplexes. Dating, Stratigraphies, Cultural Implications. Proceedings of Symposium 6.I of the XIVth Congress of the UISPP, Liege 2001. Trabalhos Arqu. 33 (Lissabon 2003) 213–221.
