= Lanitz =

Lanitz may refer to:

- Lanitz Aviation, a German aircraft manufacturer, based in Leipzig
- Lanitz-Hassel-Tal, a municipality in the Burgenlandkreis district of Saxony-Anhalt, Germany
