= Gröbitz =

- Ortsteil of Teuchern
- Interactive map of Gröbitz
- Location within Germany Location within Saxony-Anhalt
- Coordinates: 51°8′N 11°56′E
- Country: Germany
- State: Saxony-Anhalt
- District: Burgenlandkreis
- Town: Teuchern

Area
  - Total: 7.56 km^{2} (2.92 sq mi)
- Elevation: 214 m (702 ft)

Population (2009-12-31)
  - Total: 495
  - Density: 65.5/km^{2} (170/sq mi)
- Time zone: UTC+01:00 (CET)
  - Summer (DST): UTC+02:00 (CEST)
- Postal codes: 06667
- Dialling codes: 034445
- Vehicle registration: BLK
- Website: www.teucherner-land.de

Gröbitz is a village and a former municipality in the district Burgenlandkreis, in Saxony-Anhalt, Germany. Since 1 January 2011, it is part of the town Teuchern.

== History ==
The village was first mentioned in a document on February 28, 1135. Various secular and spiritual rulers owned the place. According to a description in a document from Margrave Dietrich von Landsberg from 1278, part of the place belonged to the Naumburg ward of Schönburg Castle, from which the office of Schönburg developed in the late Middle Ages.
