= Prittitz =

- Ortsteil of Teuchern
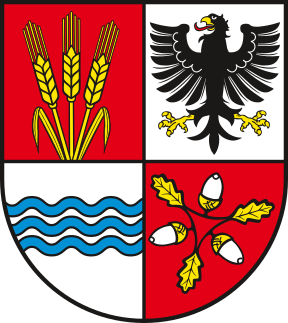
- Coat of arms
- Interactive map of Prittitz
- Location within Germany Location within Saxony-Anhalt
- Coordinates: 51°9′N 11°56′E
- Country: Germany
- State: Saxony-Anhalt
- District: Burgenlandkreis
- Town: Teuchern

Area
  - Total: 11.33 km^{2} (4.37 sq mi)
- Elevation: 196 m (643 ft)

Population (2009-12-31)
  - Total: 995
  - Density: 87.8/km^{2} (227/sq mi)
- Time zone: UTC+01:00 (CET)
  - Summer (DST): UTC+02:00 (CEST)
- Postal codes: 06667
- Dialling codes: 034445
- Vehicle registration: BLK
- Website: www.teucherner-land.de

Prittitz is a village and a former municipality in the district Burgenlandkreis, in Saxony-Anhalt, Germany. Since 1 January 2011, it is part of the town Teuchern.
