= Wethau =

- Municipality
- Location of Wethau within Burgenlandkreis district
- Interactive map of Wethau
- Location within Germany Location within Saxony-Anhalt
- Coordinates: 51°8′N 11°52′E
- Country: Germany
- State: Saxony-Anhalt
- District: Burgenlandkreis
- Municipal assoc.: Wethautal

Government
  - Mayor (2018–25): Benjamin Ritter

Area
  - Total: 7.44 km^{2} (2.87 sq mi)
- Elevation: 168 m (551 ft)

Population (2025-12-31)
  - Total: 806
  - Density: 108/km^{2} (281/sq mi)
- Time zone: UTC+01:00 (CET)
  - Summer (DST): UTC+02:00 (CEST)
- Postal codes: 06618
- Dialling codes: 03445
- Vehicle registration: BLK

Wethau is a municipality in the Burgenlandkreis district, in Saxony-Anhalt, Germany. Since 1 January 2010 it has included the former municipality of Gieckau.
