= Ernst Ortlepp =

German poet

Ernst Ortlepp (August 1, 1800 - June 14, 1864) was a German poet.

Ortlepp was born in Droyßig near Zeitz as the son of a Lutheran priest. He went to school in Pforta until he was 19 years old and then studied theology and philosophy in Leipzig. He left the university in 1824 without taking a degree.

Ortlepp returned to Leipzig during the 1830s and became famous for his political poems. Some of them were dedicated to Poland and its struggle for independence. Around this time he became an acquaintance of the young Richard Wagner (Ortlepp also met Johann Wolfgang von Goethe a few years before). His critical statements in Fieschi alarmed the Austrian statesman Metternich, who used his power to forbid the further publishment of this poem. Ortlepp finally became Leipzig's persona non grata in 1836.

He went to Württemberg, where he lived since 1837. In this period he made a living by translating the works of other poets like Lord Byron. Ortlepp tried to create a national poem, which he called Germania, during the Revolution of 1848. His financial situation worsened and he was thrown out of Württemberg in 1853. He then returned to his homeland.

Ortlepp's life became even more unstable, after his failed attempt to become a college-teacher in 1856. He got into some trouble, probably caused by alcoholism, and was imprisoned twice at Zeitz. That didn't terminate his poetical career as he was still published in a newspaper of Naumburg. He also wrote verses for private customers.

During the last years of his life, he spent a lot of time at his old school, where several teachers and students became his friends. Among them was Friedrich Nietzsche. Some biographers believe that Ortlepp was Nietzsche's mentor and deeply influenced him.

Ernst Ortlepp died near Pforta on June 14, 1864. The circumstances of his death remain mysterious. Nietzsche wrote the following words in a letter: Der alte Ortlepp ist übrigens todt. Zwischen Pforta und Almrich fiel er in einen Graben und brach den Nacken. In Pforta wurde er früh morgends bei düsterem Regen begraben; vier Arbeiter trugen den rohen Sarg; Prof. Keil folgte mit einem Regenschirm. Kein Geistlicher. Wir sprachen ihn am Todestag in Almrich. Er sagte, er gienge sich ein Logis im Saalthale zu miethen. Wir wollen ihm einen kleinen Denkstein setzen; wir haben gesammelt; wir haben an 40 Thl.

(Translation: Old Ortlepp is dead, by the way. Between Pforta and Almrich, he fell in a roadside ditch and broke his neck. They buried him at Pforta under dusky rain in the early morning; four workers carried the crude coffin; Professor Keil followed with an umbrella. There was no priest. We talked to him at Almrich on the day of his death. He said he was going to rent an accommodation in the Saale valley. We want to erect a small monument for him; we have collected money, about 40 Thaler.)

== Literature ==
- Der alte Ortlepp war's wohl doch by Hermann J. Schmidt. Alibri Verlag Aschaffenburg, 2004, ISBN 978-3-932710-69-8
- Tatsachen und Mutmaßungen über Ernst Ortlepp by Manfred Neuhaus. Books on Demand GmbH, Norderstedt 2005, ISBN 978-3-8334-2303-1
