= Deuben =

- Ortsteil of Teuchern
- Coat of arms
- Interactive map of Deuben
- Location within Germany Location within Saxony-Anhalt
- Coordinates: 51°7′N 12°4′E
- Country: Germany
- State: Saxony-Anhalt
- District: Burgenlandkreis
- Town: Teuchern

Area
  - Total: 8.78 km^{2} (3.39 sq mi)
- Elevation: 179 m (587 ft)

Population (2009-12-31)
  - Total: 1,099
  - Density: 125/km^{2} (324/sq mi)
- Time zone: UTC+01:00 (CET)
  - Summer (DST): UTC+02:00 (CEST)
- Postal codes: 06682
- Dialling codes: 034441
- Vehicle registration: BLK
- Website: www.teucherner-land.de

Deuben is a village and a former municipality in the district Burgenlandkreis, in Saxony-Anhalt, Germany. Since 1 January 2011, it has been part of the town of Teuchern.
