= Kretzschau =

- Municipality
- Coat of arms

- Location of Kretzschau within Burgenlandkreis district
- Interactive map of Kretzschau
- Location within Germany Location within Saxony-Anhalt
- Coordinates: 51°3′N 12°4′E
- Country: Germany
- State: Saxony-Anhalt
- District: Burgenlandkreis
- Municipal assoc.: Droyßiger-Zeitzer Forst

Government
  - Mayor (2021–28): Anemone Just

Area
  - Total: 27.76 km^{2} (10.72 sq mi)
- Elevation: 197 m (646 ft)

Population (2025-12-31)
  - Total: 2,279
  - Density: 82.10/km^{2} (212.6/sq mi)
- Time zone: UTC+01:00 (CET)
  - Summer (DST): UTC+02:00 (CEST)
- Postal codes: 06712
- Dialling codes: 03441, 034425
- Vehicle registration: BLK
- Website: www.vgem-dzf.de

Kretzschau (German pronunciation: [ˈkʁɛtʃaʊ]) is a municipality in the Burgenlandkreis district, in southern Saxony-Anhalt, Germany. It is part of the Verbandsgemeinde Droyßiger-Zeitzer Forst. As of December 2020, its population is 2,409. On 1 January 2010 it absorbed the former municipalities Döschwitz and Grana.
