= Gutenborn =

- Municipality
- Location of Gutenborn within Burgenlandkreis district
- Interactive map of Gutenborn
- Location within Germany Location within Saxony-Anhalt
- Coordinates: 51°0′N 12°7′E
- Country: Germany
- State: Saxony-Anhalt
- District: Burgenlandkreis
- Municipal assoc.: Droyßiger-Zeitzer Forst

Government
  - Mayor (2023–30): Karsten Beyer (CDU)

Area
  - Total: 33.93 km^{2} (13.10 sq mi)

Population (2025-12-31)
  - Total: 1,707
  - Density: 50.31/km^{2} (130.3/sq mi)
- Time zone: UTC+01:00 (CET)
  - Summer (DST): UTC+02:00 (CEST)
- Postal codes: 06712
- Dialling codes: 03441, 034423
- Vehicle registration: BLK
- Website: www.vgem-dzf.de

Gutenborn is a municipality in the Burgenlandkreis district, in Saxony-Anhalt, Germany. It was formed on 1 January 2010 by the merger of the former municipalities Bergisdorf, Droßdorf, Heuckewalde and Schellbach.
