= Weißenfels (district) =

Coordinates: 51°12′N 12°04′E

- District
- Country: Germany
- State: Saxony-Anhalt
- Disbanded: 2007-07-01
- Capital: Weißenfels

Area
  - Total: 372.41 km^{2} (143.79 sq mi)

Population (2004)
  - Total: 74,913
  - Density: 201.16/km^{2} (521.00/sq mi)
- Time zone: UTC+01:00 (CET)
  - Summer (DST): UTC+02:00 (CEST)
- Vehicle registration: WSF
- Website: landkreis-weissenfels.de

Weißenfels was a district (Kreis) in the south of Saxony-Anhalt, Germany. Neighboring districts were (from south clockwise) Burgenlandkreis, Merseburg-Querfurt and the Saxon district Leipziger Land.

== History ==
Near the small town of Goseck, archaeologists, discovered in 1999 was the oldest solar observatory in Europe, beating Stonehenge by more than 2,000 years. Around 5,000 BC, the circular trench with a diameter of 75 meters was surrounded with wood palisades, with three openings which allowed to measure the date of the spring and autumn equinox. According to the official Himmelswege / Saxony-Anhalt archaeology site, Goseck was completely excavated in three campaigns from 2002 to 2004, covering about 0.7 hectares. After that, the site was reconstructed in 2005, using thousands of oak posts, and opened to the public. A broader research project on the site’s settlement context continue from 2005 to 2013.

The site belongs to the Middle Neolithic Stroke-Ornamented Pottery Culture and is dated roughly to 4900–4600/4550 BC. Its main use seems to have been around 4900/4850–4700 BC, after which the ditch was left open and later backfilled around 4650/4550 BC.

New research by Dr. Norma Henkel shifted the interpretation of the site from an observatory toward a ritual/cultic complex with astronomical functions. The site contained pottery, animal bones, stone tools, flint flakes, and some human skeletal remains. Finds were concentrated especially near the gates and in the southeastern quadrant. Dr. Norma Henkel emphasized that many features point to a sacred or ritual function, including high concentrations of cattle skull fragments and around 30 cattle horn cores in the ditch area.

The district in today's borders was created in 1994 when the two previous districts Weissenfels and Hohenmölsen were merged.

== Geography ==
The main river in the district is the Saale with viticulture along the river valley. In the east of the district is the lignite open pit mining area of Hohenmölsen.

== Coat of arms ==
The main feature in the coat of arms is the blue band representing the river Saale. The Prussian eagle in the top-right was added as the area became part of Prussia in 1816, even though it historically belonged to Saxony. The cloverleaf with the mining symbols inside was taken from the coat of arms of the former district Hohenmölsen. The trefoil represented the agriculture in that district, the mining hammers the lignite mining.

== Towns and municipalities ==
Towns
- Hohenmölsen
Verwaltungsgemeinschaften
- Lützen-Wiesengrund (incl. town Lützen)
- Saaletal
- Vier Berge-Teucherner Land (incl. town Teuchern)
- Weißenfelser Land (incl. town Weißenfels)
