= Finneland =

- Municipality
- Location of Finneland within Burgenlandkreis district
- Interactive map of Finneland
- Location within Germany Location within Saxony-Anhalt
- Coordinates: 51°12′N 11°30′E
- Country: Germany
- State: Saxony-Anhalt
- District: Burgenlandkreis
- Municipal assoc.: An der Finne
- Subdivisions: 5

Government
  - Mayor (2022–29): Steffi Einecke

Area
  - Total: 29.43 km^{2} (11.36 sq mi)

Population (2025-12-31)
  - Total: 1,009
  - Density: 34.28/km^{2} (88.80/sq mi)
- Time zone: UTC+01:00 (CET)
  - Summer (DST): UTC+02:00 (CEST)
- Postal codes: 06647
- Dialling codes: 034465
- Vehicle registration: BLK, HHM, NEB, NMB, WSF, ZZ

Finneland (German pronunciation: [ˈfɪnəlant]) is a municipality in the Burgenlandkreis district, in Saxony-Anhalt, Germany. It was formed by the merger of the previously independent municipalities Kahlwinkel, Saubach and Steinburg, on 1 July 2009. It was named after the Finne, a range of low hills situated between Heldrungen and Bad Sulza.

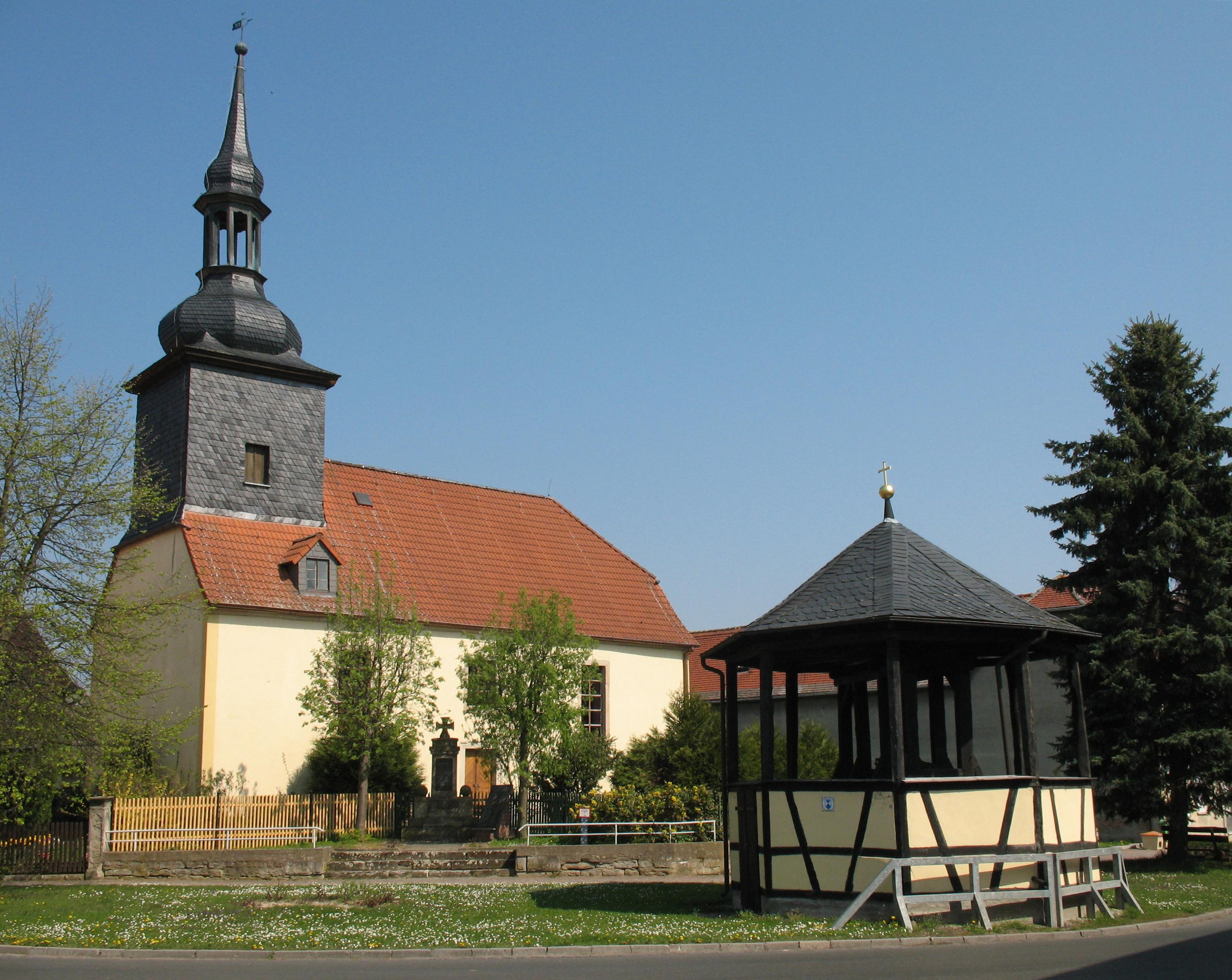
Church and bell tower in Kahlwinkel
