= Meineweh =

- Municipality
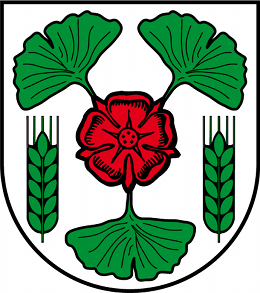
- Coat of arms

- Location of Meineweh within Burgenlandkreis district
- Interactive map of Meineweh
- Location within Germany Location within Saxony-Anhalt
- Coordinates: 51°5′N 11°58′E
- Country: Germany
- State: Saxony-Anhalt
- District: Burgenlandkreis
- Municipal assoc.: Wethautal
- Subdivisions: 2

Government
  - Mayor (2024–31): Frank Krieg

Area
  - Total: 25.25 km^{2} (9.75 sq mi)

Population (2025-12-31)
  - Total: 960
  - Density: 38/km^{2} (98/sq mi)
- Time zone: UTC+01:00 (CET)
  - Summer (DST): UTC+02:00 (CEST)
- Postal codes: 06721, 06667
- Dialling codes: 034422, 034425, 034445
- Vehicle registration: BLK
- Website: www.vgem-wethautal.de

Meineweh (German pronunciation: [ˈmaɪnəveː]) is a municipality in the Burgenlandkreis district, in Saxony-Anhalt, Germany. It was formed on 1 January 2010 as Anhalt Süd by the merger of the former municipalities Meineweh, Pretzsch and Unterkaka, and was renamed on 1 August 2011 to Meineweh.
