= Döschwitz =

- Ortsteil of Kretzschau
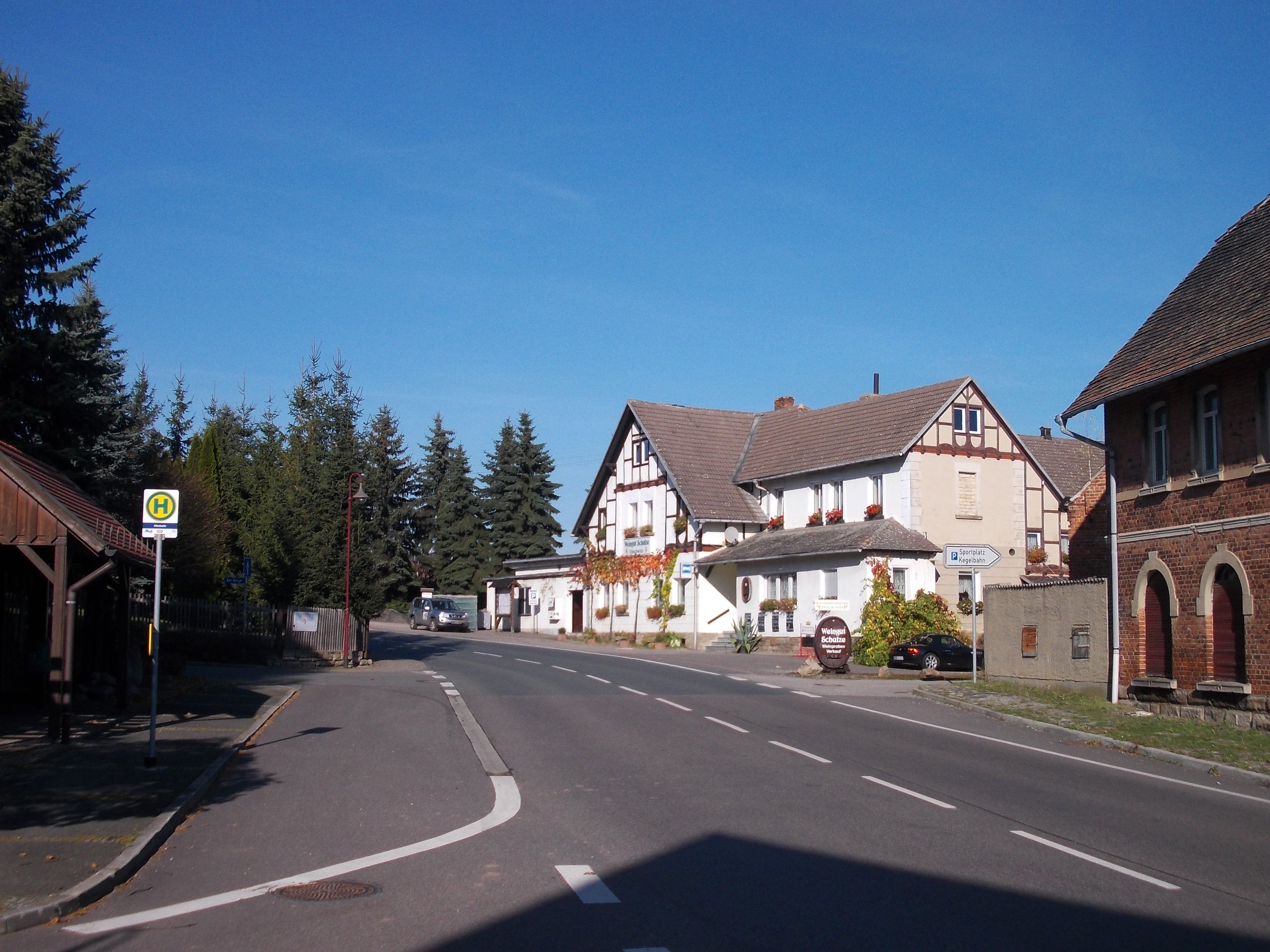
- Schultze's winery in Döschwitz
- Interactive map of Döschwitz
- Location within Germany Location within Saxony-Anhalt
- Coordinates: 51°4′N 12°3′E
- Country: Germany
- State: Saxony-Anhalt
- District: Burgenlandkreis
- Municipality: Kretzschau

Area
  - Total: 10.84 km^{2} (4.19 sq mi)
- Elevation: 189 m (620 ft)

Population (2006-12-31)
  - Total: 884
  - Density: 81.5/km^{2} (211/sq mi)
- Time zone: UTC+01:00 (CET)
  - Summer (DST): UTC+02:00 (CEST)
- Postal codes: 06712
- Dialling codes: 034425
- Website: www.vgem-dzf.de

Döschwitz is a village and a former municipality in the Burgenlandkreis district, in Saxony-Anhalt, Germany. Since 1 January 2010, it is part of the municipality Kretzschau. It is situated at Federal Road B 180 between Zeitz and Naumburg. The road is there part of the Romanic Road (German: Straße der Romanik), the most important scenic and cultural holiday road in the German state of Saxony-Anhalt.

The municipality consists of four villages:

- Döschwitz
- Gladitz
- Hollsteitz
- Kirchsteitz

Döschwitz is regionally well known for its sports club "Grün-Weiß Döschwitz". The club has five soccer teams: two for women, two for men and one for seniors. Further two teams play skittles.
