= Trebnitz =

- Ortsteil of Teuchern
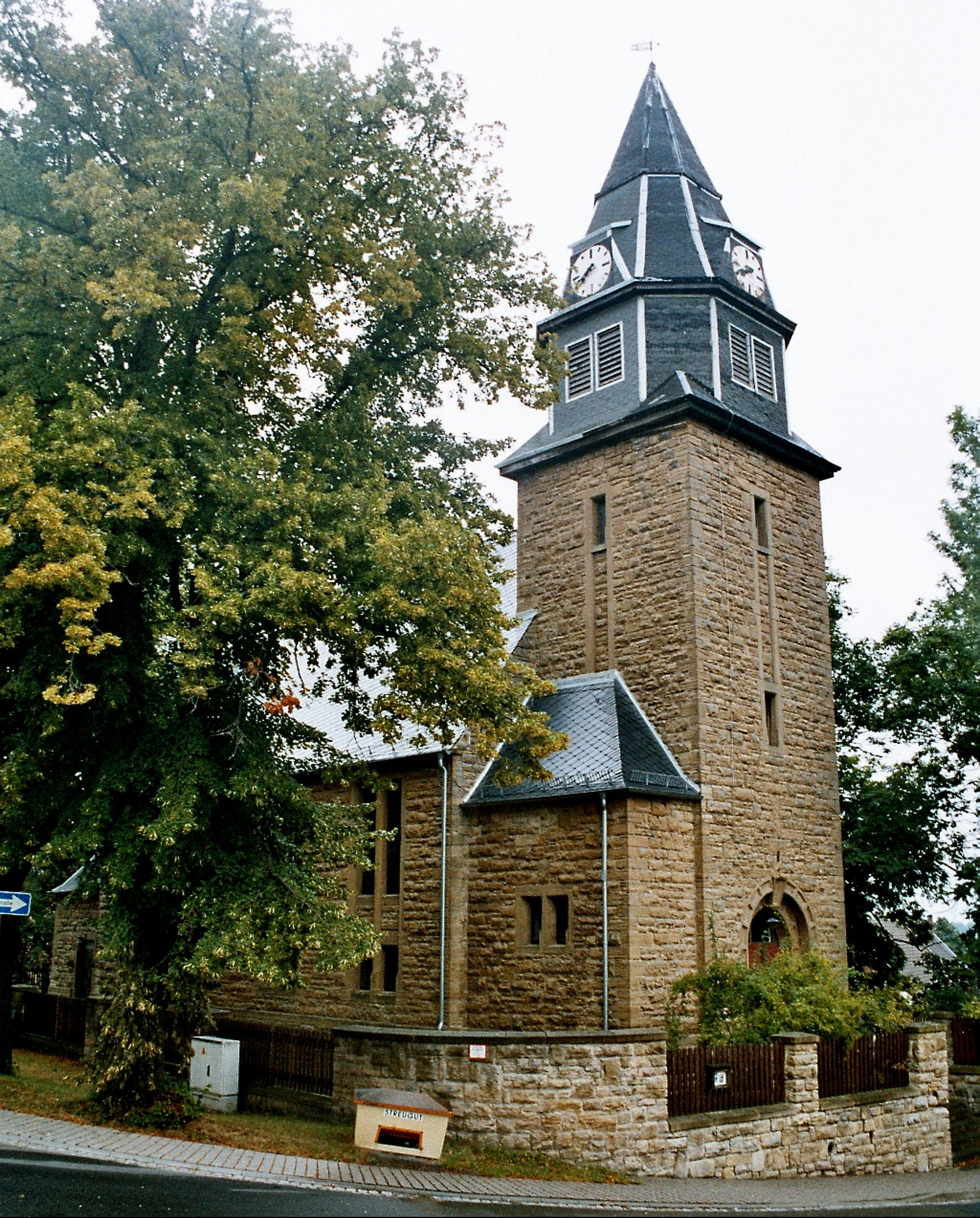
- Protestant church
- Interactive map of Trebnitz
- Location within Germany Location within Saxony-Anhalt
- Coordinates: 51°6′N 12°4′E
- Country: Germany
- State: Saxony-Anhalt
- District: Burgenlandkreis
- Town: Teuchern

Area
  - Total: 6.71 km^{2} (2.59 sq mi)
- Elevation: 182 m (597 ft)

Population (2009-12-31)
  - Total: 845
  - Density: 126/km^{2} (326/sq mi)
- Time zone: UTC+01:00 (CET)
  - Summer (DST): UTC+02:00 (CEST)
- Postal codes: 06682
- Dialling codes: 034443
- Vehicle registration: WSF
- Website: www.teucherner-land.de

Trebnitz is a village and a former municipality in the district Burgenlandkreis, in Saxony-Anhalt, Germany. Since 1 January 2011, it is part of the town Teuchern.

== People ==
- Wilhelm von Rauchhaupt (1828–1894), politician, member of Reichstag
