= Pretzsch, Burgenlandkreis =

Pretzsch
- Ortsteil of Meineweh
- Interactive map of Pretzsch
- Location within Germany Location within Saxony-Anhalt
- Coordinates: 51°05′N 11°57′E
- Country: Germany
- State: Saxony-Anhalt
- District: Burgenlandkreis
- Municipality: Meineweh

Area
  - Total: 2.38 km^{2} (0.92 sq mi)
- Elevation: 270 m (890 ft)

Population (2006-12-31)
  - Total: 171
  - Density: 71.8/km^{2} (186/sq mi)
- Time zone: UTC+01:00 (CET)
  - Summer (DST): UTC+02:00 (CEST)
- Postal codes: 06667
- Dialling codes: 034445
- Website: www.vgem-wethautal.de

Pretzsch (German pronunciation: [pʁɛtʃ]) is a village and a former municipality in the Burgenlandkreis district, in Saxony-Anhalt, Germany. Since 1 January 2010, it is part of the municipality Meineweh.
