= Gröben =

- Ortsteil of Teuchern
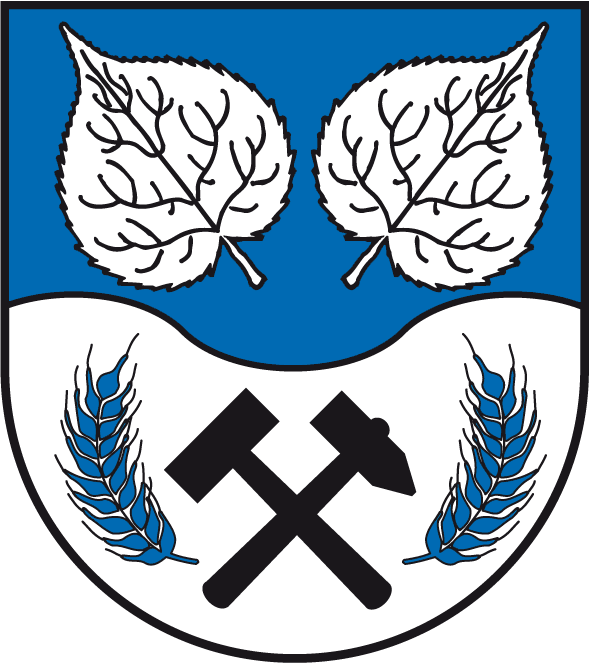
- Coat of arms
- Interactive map of Gröben
- Location within Germany Location within Saxony-Anhalt
- Coordinates: 51°7′N 12°2′E
- Country: Germany
- State: Saxony-Anhalt
- District: Burgenlandkreis
- Town: Teuchern

Area
  - Total: 3.94 km^{2} (1.52 sq mi)
- Elevation: 193 m (633 ft)

Population (2009-12-31)
  - Total: 693
  - Density: 176/km^{2} (456/sq mi)
- Time zone: UTC+01:00 (CET)
  - Summer (DST): UTC+02:00 (CEST)
- Postal codes: 06682
- Dialling codes: 034443
- Vehicle registration: WSF
- Website: www.teucherner-land.de

Gröben is a village and a former municipality in the district of Burgenlandkreis, in Saxony-Anhalt, Germany. It has been part of the town Teuchern since 1 January 2022.
