= Schönburg Castle =

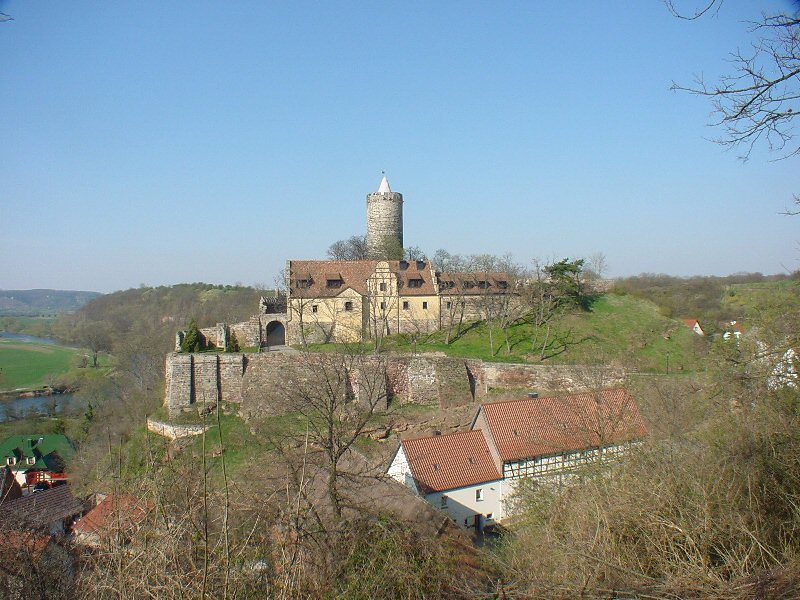

- Location within Saxony-Anhalt Schönburg Castle (Germany)

General information
- Type: Castle
- Location: Saxony-Anhalt, Germany
- Coordinates: 51°9′38″N 11°52′6″E

Schönburg Castle (German: Burg Schönburg), is in the municipality of Schönburg, Saxony-Anhalt, Germany. It has been proposed by Germany as a World Heritage Site.

== Location ==
The Late Romanesque ruins of Schönburg Castle are on top of a mottled sandstone cliff by the Saale River, which is 40 metres high and declines sharply in the west. The castle was built with the local mottled sandstone.

== History ==
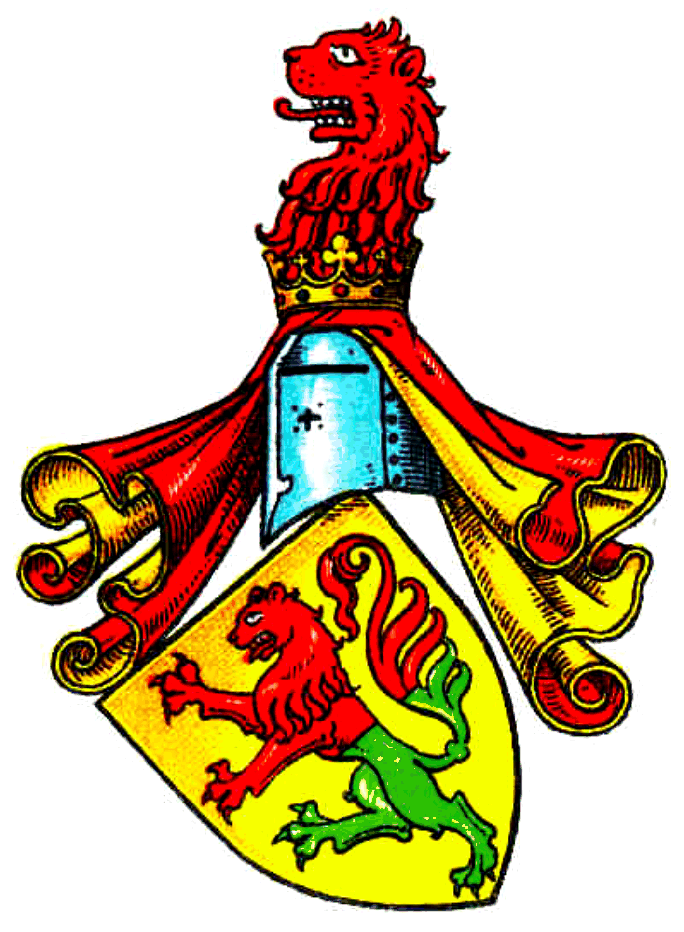
Coat of arms of the Schönberg family

The castle on top of the southern slopes of the Saale was erected as the most important castle in the 12th century on commission by the bishops of Naumburg. The bishops owned several castles within their territory to secure their assets. From 1158 at the latest, a free Schönberg noble family that owned property around Naumburg named itself after the castle. It was first documented in 1157. Schönburg has been preserved to this day and is an example from the time of classical castle construction.

== Architecture ==
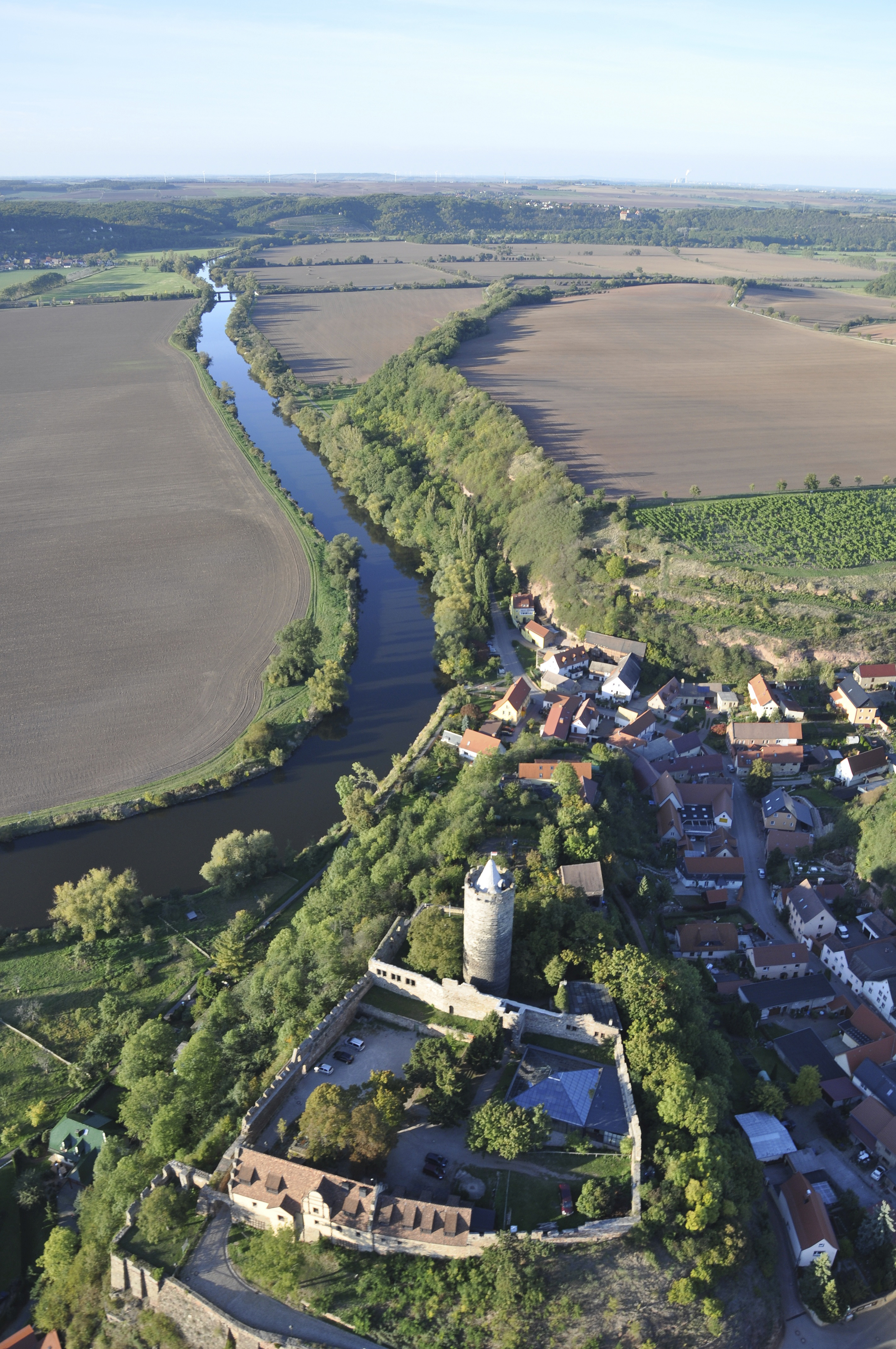
Schönburg Castle

All the walls, gates and parts of the Palas have retained their original substance from the High Middle Ages, as have parts of the interior like visible chimneys dated to 1220 and decorated windows. The architecture and decorations found here correspond to other monuments in the World Heritage nomination.

== World Heritage Nomination ==
Schönburg Castle is one of the eleven components of the cultural landscape “Naumburg Cathedral and the High Medieval Cultural Landscape of the Rivers Saale and Unstrut”. As a landmark the castle is an important part of the lines of sight connecting the cultural landscape as a whole. (Note: The Förderverein Welterbe an Saale und Unstrut e.V. is the coordinating body for this nomination: http://www.naumburg-cathedral.de/.) The World Heritage nomination is representative for the processes that shaped the continent during the High Middle Ages between 1000 and 1300: Christianization, the so-called “Landesausbau” and the dynamics of cultural exchange and transfer characteristic for this very period.

== See also ==
- World Heritage Site
- World Heritage Committee
- High Middle Ages
- Cultural Landscape
