= Nessa, Saxony-Anhalt =

Nessa
- Ortsteil of Teuchern
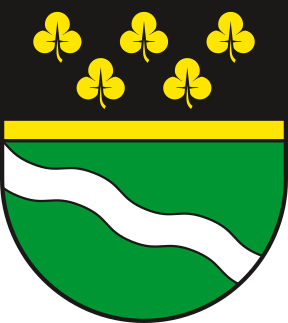
- Coat of arms
- Interactive map of Nessa
- Location within Germany Location within Saxony-Anhalt
- Coordinates: 51°9′N 12°1′E
- Country: Germany
- State: Saxony-Anhalt
- District: Burgenlandkreis
- Town: Teuchern

Area
  - Total: 14.03 km^{2} (5.42 sq mi)
- Elevation: 178 m (584 ft)

Population (2009-12-31)
  - Total: 911
  - Density: 64.9/km^{2} (168/sq mi)
- Time zone: UTC+01:00 (CET)
  - Summer (DST): UTC+02:00 (CEST)
- Postal codes: 06682
- Dialling codes: 034443
- Vehicle registration: BLK
- Website: www.teucherner-land.de

Nessa is a village and a former municipality in the district Burgenlandkreis, in Saxony-Anhalt, Germany. Since 1 January 2011, it is part of the town Teuchern.
