= Osterfeld =

- Town
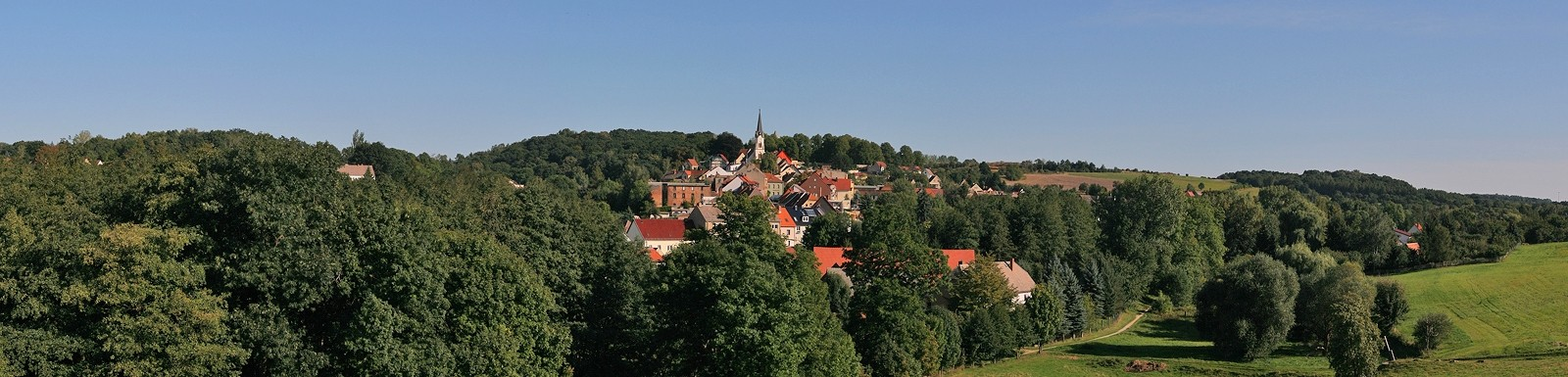
- Panoramic picture of Osterfeld

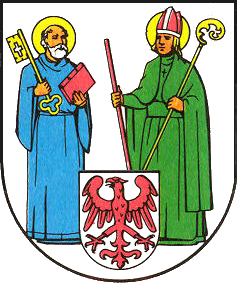
- Coat of arms

- Location of Osterfeld within Burgenlandkreis district
- Interactive map of Osterfeld
- Location within Germany Location within Saxony-Anhalt
- Coordinates: 51°4′36″N 11°55′59″E
- Country: Germany
- State: Saxony-Anhalt
- District: Burgenlandkreis
- Municipal assoc.: Wethautal

Government
  - Mayor (2023–30): Hans-Peter Binder

Area
  - Total: 27.61 km^{2} (10.66 sq mi)
- Elevation: 250 m (820 ft)

Population (2025-12-31)
  - Total: 2,336
  - Density: 84.61/km^{2} (219.1/sq mi)
- Time zone: UTC+01:00 (CET)
  - Summer (DST): UTC+02:00 (CEST)
- Postal codes: 06721, 06722
- Dialling codes: 034422
- Vehicle registration: BLK
- Website: www.vgem-wethautal.de

Osterfeld (German pronunciation: [ˈoːstɐˌfɛlt]) is a town in the Burgenlandkreis district, in Saxony-Anhalt, Germany. It is situated southeast of Naumburg. It is part of the Verbandsgemeinde ("collective municipality") Wethautal. On 1 January 2010 it absorbed the former municipalities Goldschau, Heidegrund and Waldau.

== Climate ==
Climate data for Osterfeld (1991–2020 normals)
| Month | Jan | Feb | Mar | Apr | May | Jun | Jul | Aug | Sep | Oct | Nov | Dec | Year |
|---|---|---|---|---|---|---|---|---|---|---|---|---|---|
| Mean daily maximum °C (°F) | 3.4 (38.1) | 4.8 (40.6) | 9.3 (48.7) | 14.3 (57.7) | 18.2 (64.8) | 21.8 (71.2) | 24.8 (76.6) | 24.4 (75.9) | 19.4 (66.9) | 14.0 (57.2) | 7.9 (46.2) | 4.3 (39.7) | 14.2 (57.6) |
| Daily mean °C (°F) | 2.1 (35.8) | 2.1 (35.8) | 4.3 (39.7) | 7.8 (46.0) | 12.1 (53.8) | 15.7 (60.3) | 18.0 (64.4) | 18.0 (64.4) | 14.9 (58.8) | 10.8 (51.4) | 6.5 (43.7) | 3.6 (38.5) | 9.7 (49.5) |
| Mean daily minimum °C (°F) | −1.6 (29.1) | −1.3 (29.7) | 1.3 (34.3) | 4.2 (39.6) | 8.1 (46.6) | 11.4 (52.5) | 13.6 (56.5) | 13.7 (56.7) | 10.0 (50.0) | 6.5 (43.7) | 2.4 (36.3) | −0.4 (31.3) | 5.8 (42.4) |
| Average precipitation mm (inches) | 32.2 (1.27) | 24.8 (0.98) | 36.5 (1.44) | 31.6 (1.24) | 58.8 (2.31) | 58.4 (2.30) | 79.9 (3.15) | 65.1 (2.56) | 59.4 (2.34) | 39.8 (1.57) | 45.3 (1.78) | 37.4 (1.47) | 581.7 (22.90) |
| Average precipitation days (≥ 1.0 mm) | 16.6 | 13.3 | 15.2 | 10.2 | 13.9 | 13.9 | 13.9 | 13.5 | 12.4 | 13.6 | 14.5 | 17.3 | 169.2 |
| Average relative humidity (%) | 83.7 | 79.9 | 76.0 | 69.0 | 72.4 | 72.7 | 69.2 | 69.0 | 74.1 | 80.9 | 84.9 | 85.2 | 76.4 |
| Mean monthly sunshine hours | 64.3 | 82.7 | 133.7 | 197.7 | 218.6 | 226.0 | 232.0 | 216.9 | 164.5 | 117.9 | 67.7 | 54.9 | 1,822.2 |
Source: World Meteorological Organization

== Notable people ==
- Günther Prien (1908-1941), World War II U-boat commander
