= Droyßig =

- Municipality
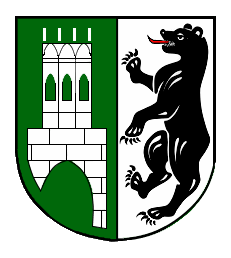
- Coat of arms

- Location of Droyßig within Burgenlandkreis district
- Interactive map of Droyßig
- Location within Germany Location within Saxony-Anhalt
- Coordinates: 51°3′N 12°2′E
- Country: Germany
- State: Saxony-Anhalt
- District: Burgenlandkreis
- Municipal assoc.: Droyßiger-Zeitzer Forst

Government
  - Mayor (2023–30): Evelyn Billing

Area
  - Total: 20.32 km^{2} (7.85 sq mi)
- Elevation: 234 m (768 ft)

Population (2025-12-31)
  - Total: 1,830
  - Density: 90.1/km^{2} (233/sq mi)
- Time zone: UTC+01:00 (CET)
  - Summer (DST): UTC+02:00 (CEST)
- Postal codes: 06722
- Dialling codes: 034425
- Vehicle registration: BLK

Droyßig (German pronunciation: [ˈdʁɔʏsɪç]) is a municipality in the Burgenlandkreis district, in Saxony-Anhalt, Germany. On 1 January 2010 it absorbed the former municipality Weißenborn.

== Geography ==
Droyßig is located about 8 km west of Zeitz.

== Politics ==
The council is composed of Droyßig from 12 Ratsfrauen and councilors. Evelyn Billing has been mayor of Droyßig since 2016.

== Culture and sightseeing ==
=== Structures ===
The Castle Droyßig was at the beginning of the 13th Century as an imperial castle built. Today's impressive living quarters the town its character.

=== Monuments ===
A memorial stone in the park (for DDR-time "Ernst-Thalmann-Park") commemorates the victims of fascism. The Thalmann bust situated there was removed after 1989.

=== Regular events ===
The Castle Festival is always the beginning of June and Others organized with a medieval market. Well known in the surrounding municipalities is also the annual Christmas market takes place, which takes place just one day in December, around the historic castle. Also an annual event with a large regional reputation is established in the city of Stiftungsfest Christophorus Gymnasium of CJD in May each year, recalls that at the foundation of Droyßiger institutions and attracts mainly families of pupils at school.

== Economy and infrastructure ==
=== Transport ===
The railroad Zeitz-Camburg was set aside in 2000. Adjacent municipalities like Droyßig have spoken out on political grounds for a bus (in the whole region bus (in parallel) transport and railway lines to set the agenda), the (very small and often congested) bus service is made public, business and traffic point of view not much longer so portable, it is an association for the promotion of the railway line to be established. Connects to highway 180 to Zeitz and Naumburg (Saale), it is 4 km in a northerly direction.

== Personalities ==
=== Sons and daughters of the town ===
- Catarina Fitztuhm née Binau to Dresig (Droyßig) (c. 1496–1558), buried in St Martin's Church, Apolda
- Ludwig Gebhard von Hoym (1631–1711), Royal Saxon Elector and Polish real Privy Council, crag, chamber president and chief tax district in Thuringia, hereditary chamberlain of the Principality of Halberstadt and landlord to Droyßig, ways of life, and Burgscheidungen Kirchscheidungen
- Adolph Magnus Hoym (1668–1723), Royal Saxon Elector and Polish real Privy Council, cabinet ministers, general excise tax inspector, senior tax manager and entrepreneur
- Ernst Ortlepp (1800–1864), poet of the pre
- Johann Karl Zeune (1736–1788), German philologist

=== People who have worked on site ===
- Michael Ranft (1700–1774), theologian scholar who wrote many works, including a famous work on vampirism. Was a pastor in the city 1739/44-1749
- Friedrich Wilhelm Kritzinger, (1816–1890) theologian, teacher and songwriter, first director of Droyßiger institutions
- Hildegard Scholz (23 January 1894 in Leipzig – 6 December 6 1991 in Brunswick), a painter and a freelance artist for three decades working as an art teacher for young women and girls in institutions Droyßiger
- Petra Pau (born 1963), Vice-President of the German Parliament (The Left), 1979 training at the Central Institute of the pioneer organization in Droyßig
