= Stößen =

- Town
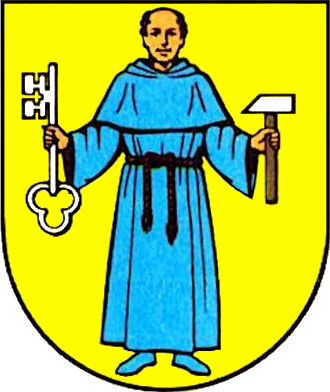
- Coat of arms

- Location of Stößen within Burgenlandkreis district
- Interactive map of Stößen
- Location within Germany Location within Saxony-Anhalt
- Coordinates: 51°6′35″N 11°55′59″E
- Country: Germany
- State: Saxony-Anhalt
- District: Burgenlandkreis
- Municipal assoc.: Wethautal

Government
  - Mayor (2020–27): Horst Schubert

Area
  - Total: 7.29 km^{2} (2.81 sq mi)
- Elevation: 245 m (804 ft)

Population (2025-12-31)
  - Total: 865
  - Density: 119/km^{2} (307/sq mi)
- Time zone: UTC+01:00 (CET)
  - Summer (DST): UTC+02:00 (CEST)
- Postal codes: 06667
- Dialling codes: 034445
- Vehicle registration: BLK
- Website: Stadt Stößen

Stößen (German pronunciation: [ˈʃtøːsn̩]) is a town in the Burgenlandkreis district, in Saxony-Anhalt, Germany. It is situated southeast of Naumburg. It is part of the Verbandsgemeinde ("collective municipality") Wethautal.

== Windpark ==
Since 2010, there are at 51°07′06″N 11°57′01″E a wind park consisting of 3 Enercon E-126 wind turbines, the most powerful wind turbine in the world. Each of these turbines has a rotor with 126 metres diameter mounted in a height of 135 metres and can generate 7.5 MW.
