= Lanitz-Hassel-Tal =

- Municipality
- Location of Lanitz-Hassel-Tal within Burgenlandkreis district
- Interactive map of Lanitz-Hassel-Tal
- Location within Germany Location within Saxony-Anhalt
- Coordinates: 51°09′N 11°40′E
- Country: Germany
- State: Saxony-Anhalt
- District: Burgenlandkreis
- Municipal assoc.: An der Finne
- Subdivisions: 12

Government
  - Mayor (2024–31): Manuela Hartung

Area
  - Total: 31.5 km^{2} (12.2 sq mi)

Population (2025-12-31)
  - Total: 1,002
  - Density: 31.8/km^{2} (82.4/sq mi)
- Time zone: UTC+01:00 (CET)
  - Summer (DST): UTC+02:00 (CEST)
- Postal codes: 06628
- Dialling codes: 034463
- Vehicle registration: BLK

Lanitz-Hassel-Tal is a municipality in the Burgenlandkreis district, in Saxony-Anhalt, Germany. It was formed by the merger of the previously independent municipalities Möllern and Taugwitz, on 1 July 2009.
