= Schönburg (Saale) =

- Municipality
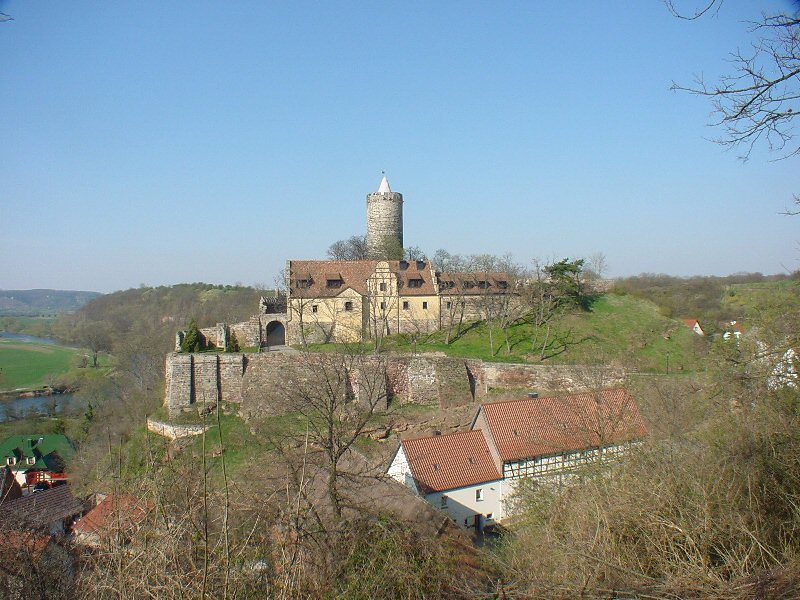

- Location of Schönburg within Burgenlandkreis district
- Interactive map of Schönburg
- Location within Germany Location within Saxony-Anhalt
- Coordinates: 51°10′N 11°52′E
- Country: Germany
- State: Saxony-Anhalt
- District: Burgenlandkreis
- Municipal assoc.: Wethautal

Government
  - Mayor (2022–29): Karsten Stützer

Area
  - Total: 14.6 km^{2} (5.6 sq mi)
- Elevation: 151 m (495 ft)

Population (2025-12-31)
  - Total: 953
  - Density: 65.3/km^{2} (169/sq mi)
- Time zone: UTC+01:00 (CET)
  - Summer (DST): UTC+02:00 (CEST)
- Postal codes: 06618
- Dialling codes: 03445
- Vehicle registration: BLK

Schönburg (German pronunciation: [ˈʃøːnbʊʁk]) is a municipality in the Burgenlandkreis district, in Saxony-Anhalt, Germany. It is situated 5 km east of Naumburg, on the river Saale. It is part of the Verbandsgemeinde ("collective municipality") Wethautal.

The castle was built by the House of Schönburg around 1120 and came into the ownership of the Bishopric of Naumburg-Zeitz during the following century.
