= Wetterzeube =

- Municipality
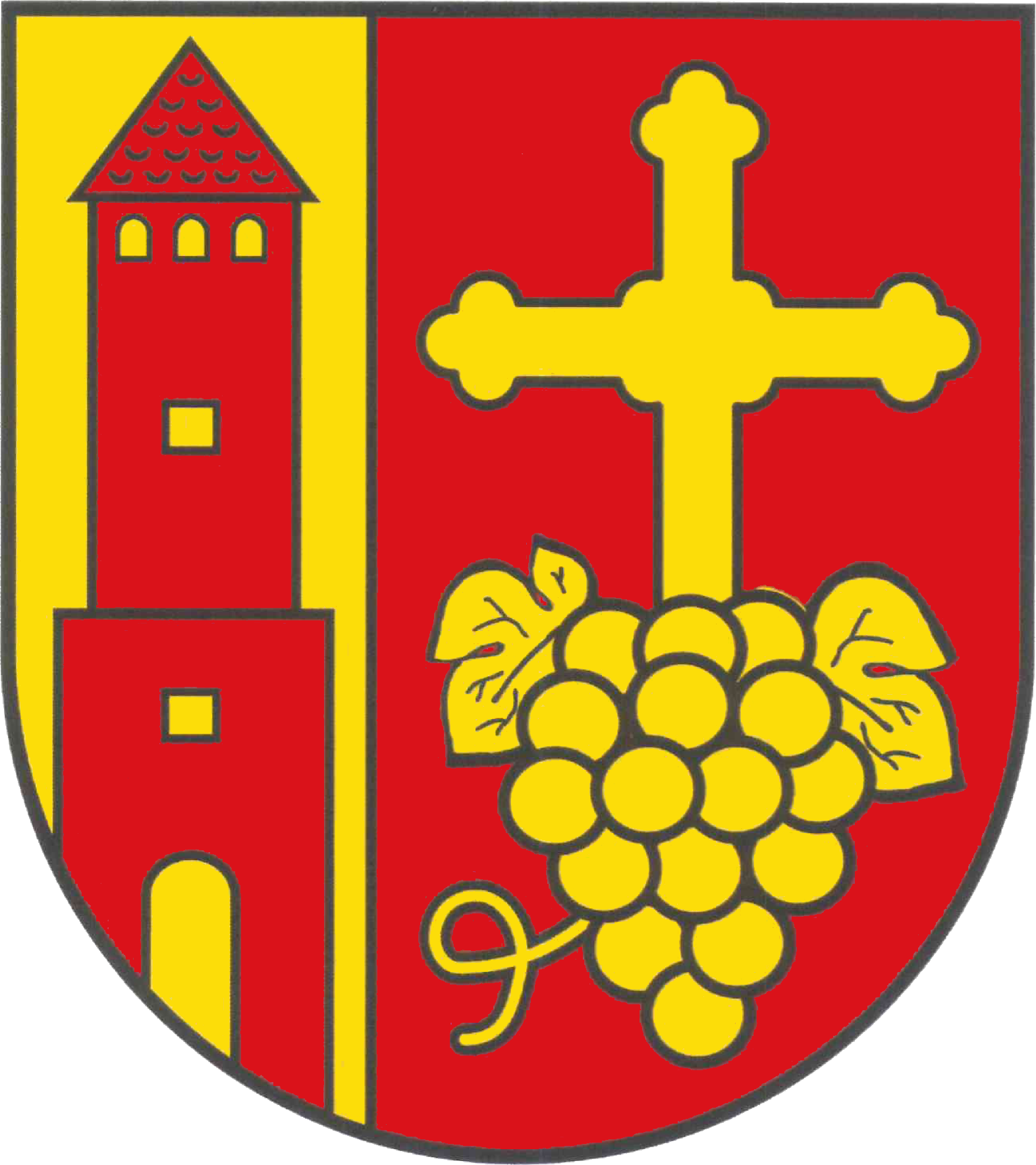
- Coat of arms

- Location of Wetterzeube within Burgenlandkreis district
- Interactive map of Wetterzeube
- Location within Germany Location within Saxony-Anhalt
- Coordinates: 51°0′N 12°1′E
- Country: Germany
- State: Saxony-Anhalt
- District: Burgenlandkreis
- Municipal assoc.: Droyßiger-Zeitzer Forst

Government
  - Mayor (2023–30): Frank Jacob (Left)

Area
  - Total: 41.44 km^{2} (16.00 sq mi)
- Elevation: 264 m (866 ft)

Population (2025-12-31)
  - Total: 1,608
  - Density: 38.80/km^{2} (100.5/sq mi)
- Time zone: UTC+01:00 (CET)
  - Summer (DST): UTC+02:00 (CEST)
- Postal codes: 06722
- Dialling codes: 036693, 034425
- Vehicle registration: BLK, HHM, NEB, NMB, WSF, ZZ
- Website: www.vgem-dzf.de

Wetterzeube is a municipality in the Burgenlandkreis district, in Saxony-Anhalt, Germany. On 1 January 2010 it absorbed the former municipalities Breitenbach and Haynsburg.
