= Droyßiger-Zeitzer Forst =

- Verbandsgemeinde
- Map of Burgenlandkreis highlighting Droyßiger-Zeitzer Forst
- Interactive map of Droyßiger-Zeitzer Forst
- Location within Germany Location within Saxony-Anhalt
- Country: Germany
- State: Saxony-Anhalt
- District: Burgenlandkreis
- Seat: Droyßig
- Subdivisions: 5 municipalities

Area
  - Total: 144.19 km^{2} (55.67 sq mi)

Population (2025-12-31)
  - Total: 8,287
  - Density: 57.47/km^{2} (148.9/sq mi)
- Time zone: UTC+01:00 (CET)
  - Summer (DST): UTC+02:00 (CEST)
- Website: www.vgem-dzf.de

Droyßiger-Zeitzer Forst is a Verbandsgemeinde ("collective municipality") in the Burgenlandkreis district, in Saxony-Anhalt, Germany. Before 1 January 2010, it was a Verwaltungsgemeinschaft. It is situated west of Zeitz. The seat of the Verbandsgemeinde is in Droyßig.

The Verbandsgemeinde Droyßiger-Zeitzer Forst consists of the following municipalities:

1. Droyßig
2. Gutenborn
3. Kretzschau
4. Schnaudertal
5. Wetterzeube
