= Wethautal =

Municipality in Saxony-Anhalt, Germany

- Verbandsgemeinde
- Map of Burgenlandkreis highlighting Wethautal
- Interactive map of Wethautal
- Location within Germany Location within Saxony-Anhalt
- Coordinates: 51°05′N 11°56′E
- Country: Germany
- State: Saxony-Anhalt
- District: Burgenlandkreis
- Seat: Osterfeld
- Subdivisions: 7 municipalities

Area
  - Total: 148.87 km^{2} (57.48 sq mi)

Population (2025-12-31)
  - Total: 8,393
  - Density: 56.38/km^{2} (146.0/sq mi)
- Time zone: UTC+01:00 (CET)
  - Summer (DST): UTC+02:00 (CEST)
- Website: www.vgem-wethautal.de

Wethautal is a Verbandsgemeinde ("collective municipality") in the Burgenlandkreis district in Saxony-Anhalt, Germany. Before 1 January 2010, it was a Verwaltungsgemeinschaft. It is situated along the small river Wethau, a tributary of the Saale, southeast of Naumburg. The seat of the Verbandsgemeinde is in Osterfeld.

The Verbandsgemeinde Wethautal consists of the following municipalities:

1. Meineweh
2. Mertendorf
3. Molauer Land
4. Osterfeld
5. Schönburg
6. Stößen
7. Wethau
