= Friedrich Wilhelm Kritzinger (theologian) =

- Born: 24 January 1816; Lehnin
- Died: 12 July 1890 (aged 74); Naumburg
- Occupations: Theologian; Pedagogue; Poet; Hymnwriter
- Organization: Lehrerinnenbildungsanstalt in Droyßig
- Awards: House Order of Hohenzollern; Order of the Red Eagle

Friedrich Wilhelm Kritzinger (24 January 1816 – 12 July 1890) was a German Protestant theologian, pedagogue, poet and hymnwriter. He was for 38 years the director of a newly founded educational institution for women teachers in Droyßig. His Christmas carol "Süßer die Glocken nie klingen", written to the melody of a popular Volkslied, has remained a favourite.

== Life ==
Born in Lehnin, Kritzinger attended the abbey school (Klosterschule) in Lehnin and the gymnasium of the Ritterakademie in Dom (now part of Brandenburg an der Havel). He studied theology in Berlin with August Neander. He directed a private educational institution in Pyritz, Pomerania, from 1847 to 1850. He was then appointed Rektor of the municipal school (Stadtschule) in Naugard. On a recommendation by Friedrich Eichhorn, the Prussian minister of culture, Otto Victor I von Schönburg called Kritzinger to be the first director of the Lehrerinnenbildungsanstalt in Droyßig, a seminar to teach women educators, from 8 July 1852. Kritzinger held the position for 38 years.

He wrote poems and hymns, to be used first of all in the daily morning devotions (Morgenandacht) that he held, and further for high religious holidays. His Christmas carol Süßer die Glocken nie klingen, which he wrote to the melody of a popular Volkslied from Thuringia, "Dort sinket die Sonne im Westen", achieved lasting popularity. His poem "Der Wald" (The woods), beginning "Wald, du bist so wunderschön" (Woods, you are so very beautiful) was set as choral music several times, including versions by Michael Eduard Surläuly and Karl Attenhofer.

Due to ill health, he requested retirement for 1 July 1890. He moved with his family to Naumburg where he died shortly afterwards. He was buried on the cemetery of Droyßig opposite the graves of the Prince's family, as Hugo zu Schönburg-Waldenburg requested.

== Awards ==
Kritzinger was awarded the knighthood of the House Order of Hohenzollern in 1875. He received the title Königlicher Schulrat (Royal school counselor) in 1885. He was awarded the Order of the Red Eagle class IV in 1888, and class III in 1890. The Wilhelm-Kritzinger-Straße in Droyßig is named after him. In his birth town, a street is named Kritzinger-Gasse in honour of him and his brother Ludwig Kritzinger.

== Work ==
Kritzinger's published works include, according to contemporary lists:

- Lebensblüthen in Liedern. Duncker, Berlin 1857 (Digital link).
- Liederbüchlein für Kinder. Streiber, Zeitz 1857.
- Eichenblätter zu Preußens jüngstem Ehrenkranze. Heinicke, Berlin 1864, OCLC 246779683.
- Samenkörner aus Gottes Wort. Kay, Kassel 1866, OCLC 179922494.
- Weihnachtsbüchlein für Schule und Haus. Webel, Zeitz 1866, OCLC 246776240.
- Weihnachtsstrauß für Haus und Schule. Huch, Zeitz 1869.
- Vaterlands-Lieder. Huch, Zeitz 1876.
- Pilgerklänge. Gedichte. Huch, Zeitz 1885, OCLC 246930296.

=== "Süßer die Glocken nie klingen" ===
Kritzinger is remembered for the lyrics of one song, the Christmas carol "Süßer die Glocken nie klingen" (Sweeter the bells never sound). He wrote it to go with a popular Volkslied melody, of the evening song "Seht, wie die Sonne dort sinket" (Look how the sun is setting there), which was documented from 1841. Kritzinger's song was first printed in 1860 in the collection Liederstrauß (Song bouquet) by Bernhard Brähmig. The earlier song mentions bells, which may have inspired Kritzinger to write about bells ringing throughout the world as a symbol of peace and joy.
