= Krauschwitz, Saxony-Anhalt =

Krauschwitz
- Ortsteil of Teuchern
- Interactive map of Krauschwitz
- Location within Germany Location within Saxony-Anhalt
- Coordinates: 51°7′N 11°58′E
- Country: Germany
- State: Saxony-Anhalt
- District: Burgenlandkreis
- Town: Teuchern

Area
  - Total: 12.39 km^{2} (4.78 sq mi)
- Elevation: 219 m (719 ft)

Population (2009-12-31)
  - Total: 565
  - Density: 45.6/km^{2} (118/sq mi)
- Time zone: UTC+01:00 (CET)
  - Summer (DST): UTC+02:00 (CEST)
- Postal codes: 06682
- Dialling codes: 034443
- Vehicle registration: BLK
- Website: www.teucherner-land.de

Krauschwitz is a village and a former municipality in the district Burgenlandkreis, in Saxony-Anhalt, Germany. Since 1 January 2011, it is part of the town Teuchern.
