= Teuchern =

- Town
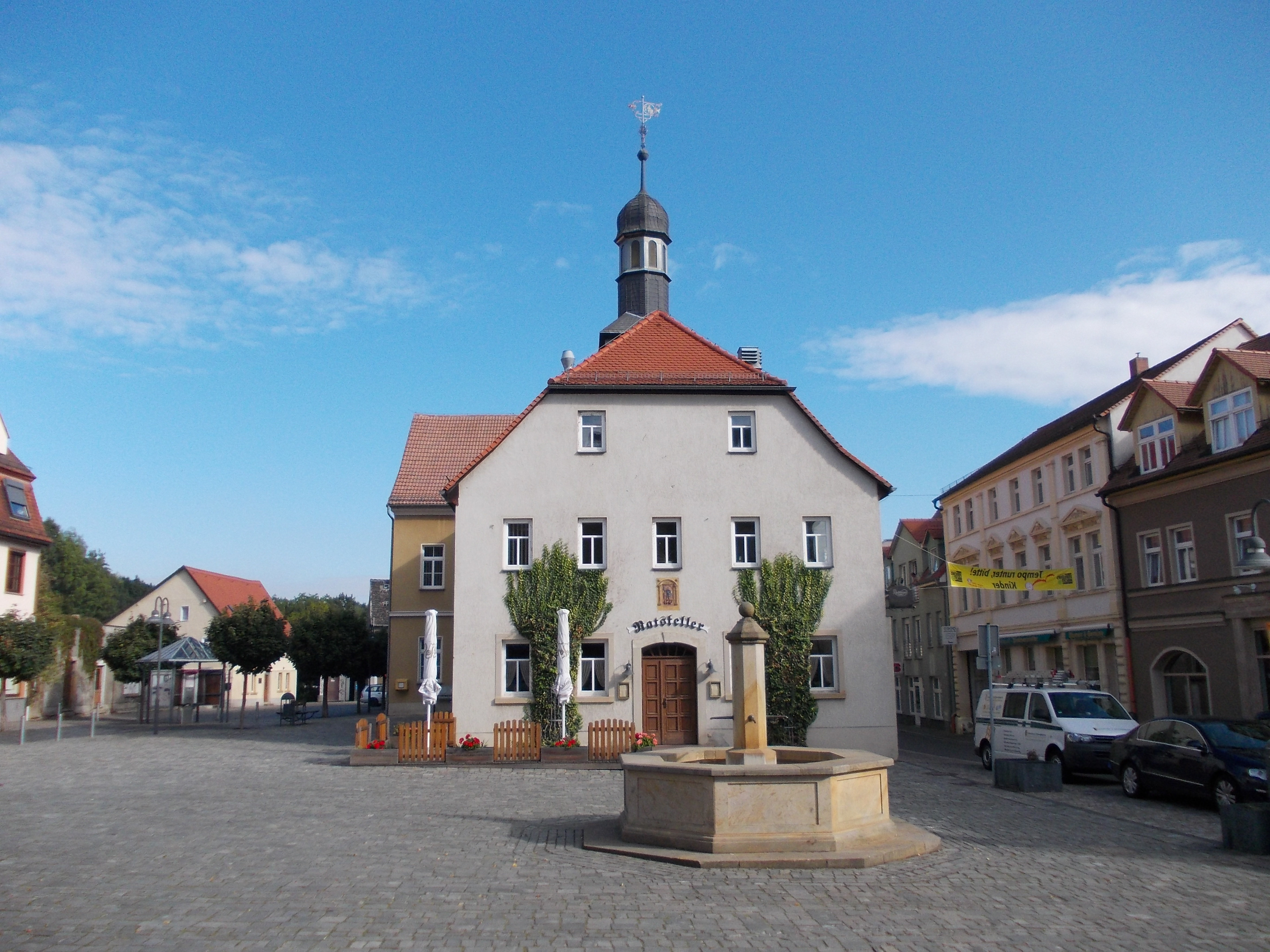
- Market square with the town hall

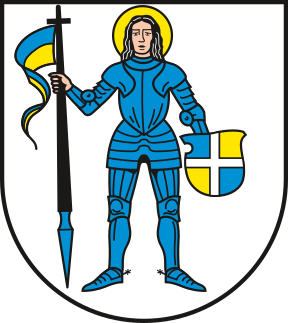
- Coat of arms

- Location of Teuchern within Burgenlandkreis district
- Interactive map of Teuchern
- Location within Germany Location within Saxony-Anhalt
- Coordinates: 51°7′N 12°1′E
- Country: Germany
- State: Saxony-Anhalt
- District: Burgenlandkreis
- Subdivisions: 6

Government
  - Mayor (2017–24): Marcel Schneider (Ind.)

Area
  - Total: 81.36 km^{2} (31.41 sq mi)
- Elevation: 175 m (574 ft)

Population (2025-12-31)
  - Total: 7,645
  - Density: 93.97/km^{2} (243.4/sq mi)
- Time zone: UTC+01:00 (CET)
  - Summer (DST): UTC+02:00 (CEST)
- Postal codes: 06680–06682
- Dialling codes: 034443
- Vehicle registration: BLK
- Website: www.stadt-teuchern.de

Teuchern (German pronunciation: [ˈtɔʏçɐn]) is a town in the Burgenlandkreis district, in Saxony-Anhalt, Germany. It is situated approximately 10 km southeast of Weißenfels. On 1 January 2011 it absorbed the former municipalities Deuben, Gröben, Gröbitz, Krauschwitz, Nessa, Prittitz and Trebnitz. These 7 former municipalities and Teuchern proper are now Ortschaften or municipal divisions of the town Teuchern.

== Sons and daughters of the town ==
- Reinhard Keiser, composer, (1674-1739)
- Johann Christian Schieferdecker, organist and composer, (1679-1732)
- Peter Meyer, keyboardist and saxophonist of the Puhdys, (born 1940 in Wildschütz)
- Jürgen Pahl, football goalkeeper, (born 1956)
