= Peter Kruschwitz =

German classical scholar

Peter Kruschwitz FHEA FRHistS M.A.E. (born 1973) is Professor of Ancient Cultural History at the University of Vienna. He specialises in Roman poetic culture and song culture with a particular focus on Latin verse inscriptions (Carmina Latina Epigraphica) and non-elite cultural practice. He has published widely on Roman comedy (most notably Plautus and Terence), Latin linguistics and Roman linguistic discourse, the wall inscriptions of Pompeii and Herculaneum, and Roman metre.

== Education ==
Kruschwitz studied Classical Philology at the Freie Universität Berlin, where he was awarded his PhD in 1999. His doctoral thesis, supervised by Gabriele Thome, was entitled 'Carmina Saturnia Epigraphica: Einleitung, Text und Kommentar zu den saturnischen Versinschriften' (Carmina Saturnia Epigraphica: Introduction, Text and Commentary on the Saturnian verse inscriptions).

== Career ==
Already during his doctoral studies Kruschwitz began to work as a member of research staff of the Corpus Inscriptionum Latinarum at the Berlin-Brandenburg Academy of Sciences and Humanities. In 2007 Kruschwitz was appointed Lecturer in Classics at the University of Reading, where he was promoted to Reader in Classics in 2009 and to Professor of Classics in 2011.

Kruschwitz has been awarded numerous fellowships, visiting positions, and research grants. In 2005, Kruschwitz was awarded a two-year Emmy Noether postdoctoral fellowship of the Deutsche Forschungsgemeinschaft which he spent at the University of Oxford. In 2007, Kruschwitz was a Visiting Fellow of All Souls College, Oxford. In 2014, Kruschwitz was awarded a British Academy Mid-Career Fellowship. In 2018 Kruschwitz was a visiting professor at the University of Seville. Kruschwitz is academician of the Pontifical Academy for Latin and a full member of the Academia Europaea. In 2019, Kruschwitz was awarded a European Research Council Advanced Grant for a project on 'Mapping out the poetic landscape(s) of the Roman empire'.

Kruschwitz is member of the editorial board of Bryn Mawr Classical Review and Habis.

Kruschwitz was appointed Professor of Ancient Cultural History at the University of Vienna in 2019.

== Bibliography (selection) ==
=== Monographs and edited volumes ===
- The writing on the wall: Reading’s Latin inscriptions. Two Rivers Press: Reading 2015.
- Die metrischen Inschriften der römischen Republik. W. de Gruyter: Berlin/New York 2007.
- Terentius Poeta. Beck: München 2007 (in collaboration with W.W. Ehlers and Fritz Felgentreu).
- Das vorklassische Lehrgedicht der Römer. Winter: Heidelberg 2005 (in collaboration with Matthias Schumacher).
- Römische Inschriften und Wackernagels Gesetz. Untersuchungen zur Syntax epigraphischer Texte aus republikanischer Zeit. Winter: Heidelberg 2004.
- Terenz. Olms-Verlag: Hildesheim 2004.
- Carmina Saturnia Epigraphica. Einleitung, Text und Kommentar zu den saturnischen Versinschriften. Steiner Verlag: Stuttgart 2002 (= PhD thesis, Freie Universität Berlin 1999).
- Terenz: Phormio. Lateinisch / Deutsch. Reclam: Stuttgart 1999.

=== Articles ===
- “Dichterische Freiheit und sklavische Unterordnung: Überlegungen zur Poetik der Sklaverei in den Carmina Latina Epigraphica Germaniens”, Gymnasium. Zeitschrift für Kultur der Antike und Humanistische Bildung 125 (2018) 195–220.
- “Inhabiting a Lettered World. Exploring the Fringes of Roman Writing Habits”, Bulletin of the Institute of Classical Studies 59.1 (2016) 26–41.
- “Reading and writing in Pompeii: an outline of the local discourse”, Studj Romanzi n. s. 10 (2014) 245–279.
- “How to apologise in Latin: a case study”, in: Bochumer Altertumswissenschaftliches Colloquium 95, Trier 2013, 53–86 (with A. Cleary-Venables).
- “Memento mori: The Use(s) of the Future Imperative in the Carmina Latina Epigraphica”, in: J. Gómez Pallarès – J. del Hoyo – M. Limón – C. Fernández Martínez (edd.), Ex officina: literatura epigrafica en verso, Seville 2013, 193–216.
- “Language, Sex, and (Lack of) Power: Reassessing the Linguistic Discourse about Female Speech in Latin Sources”, Athenaeum 100 (2012) 197–229.
- “How to Avoid Profanity in Latin: An Exploratory Study”, in: Materiali e discussioni 68 (2012) 9–38.
- “Gallic War Songs: Furius Bibaculus’ Annales Belli Gallici”, Philologus. Zeitschrift für antike Literatur und ihre Rezeption 154 (2010) 285–305.
- “Attitudes towards wall inscriptions in the Roman Empire”, Zeitschrift für Papyrologie und Epigraphik 174 (2010) 207–218.
- "Tree Inscriptions: restoring a lost facet of the Graeco-Roman epigraphic habit”, Zeitschrift für Papyrologie und Epigraphik 173 (2010) 45–62.
- “Patterns of Text Layout in Pompeian Verse Inscriptions”, Studia Philologica Valentina 11 (n. s. 8) (2008) 225–264.
- “Carmina Latina Epigraphica Pompeiana: Ein Dossier”, Arctos. Acta philologica Fennica 38 (2004) 27–58.
- "Die antiken Quellen zum Saturnischen Vers”, Mnemosyne. A Journal of Classical Studies S. IV 55 (2002) 465–498.
- “Die antiken Wurzeln des Begriffs “Parasit””, in: Th. Hiepe – A. Aeschlimann – J. Eckert – R. Lucius (edd.), Parasitismus als Lebensform. Leopoldina-Symposium vom 16. bis 18. September 1999 in Halle (Saale) (Nova Acta Leopoldina N. F. 83, Nr. 316) 2000, 147–158 (with Th. Hiepe).
- “Römische Werbeinschriften”, Gymnasium. Zeitschrift für Kultur der Antike und Humanistische Bildung 106 (1999) 231–253.
- “Saturnier erkennen, ohne den Saturnier zu kennen?”, Epigraphica. Periodico internazionale di epigrafia 61 (1999) 27–35.
- “Daniel Bernoulli: Entwurf einer neuen Theorie zur Bewertung von Lotterien. “Specimen theoriae novae de mensura sortis”, Commentarii Academiae Scientiarum Imperialis Petropolitanae 1738, S. 175–192. Aus dem Lateinischen übersetzt”, Die Betriebswirtschaft 56 (1996) 733–742 (with L. Kruschwitz).
