= Burgenlandkreis =

District of Saxony-Anhalt, Germany

Coordinates: 51°9′N 11°52′E

- District
- Flag Coat of arms
- Country: Germany
- State: Saxony-Anhalt
- Capital: Naumburg

Government
  - District admin.: Götz Ulrich (CDU)

Area
  - Total: 1,414.0 km^{2} (545.9 sq mi)

Population (31 December 2022)
  - Total: 177,212
  - Density: 130/km^{2} (320/sq mi)
- Time zone: UTC+01:00 (CET)
  - Summer (DST): UTC+02:00 (CEST)
- Vehicle registration: BLK, HHM, NEB, NMB, WSF, ZZ
- Website: www.burgenlandkreis.de

Burgenlandkreis (German pronunciation: [ˈbʊʁɡn̩lantˌkʁaɪs]) is a district in Saxony-Anhalt, Germany. Its area is 1,414.0 km^{2} (545.9 sq mi).

== History ==
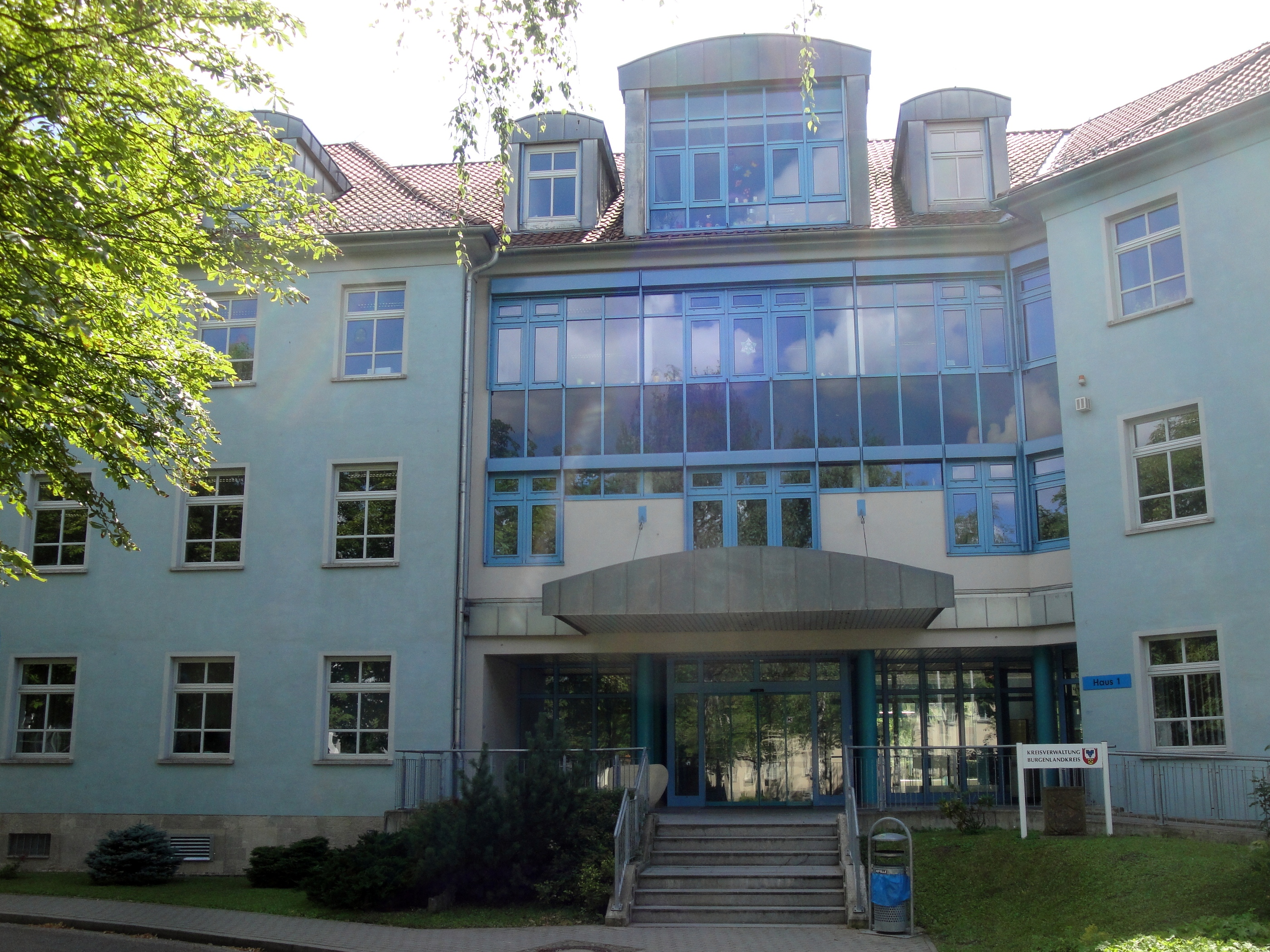
Naumburg Kreisverwaltung Burgenlandkreis

The district was established as Landkreis Burgenland by the merger of the former Burgenlandkreis and Landkreis Weißenfels as part of the reform of 2007. On 16 July 2007, the district parliament decided to change the name to Burgenlandkreis, which came into effect on 1 August 2007.

In 2015 the skeletal remains of an ancient inhabitant of Karsdorf dated from the Early Neolithic (7200 BP) were analyzed; he turned out to belong to the paternal T1a-M70 lineage and maternal lineage H1.

== Towns and municipalities ==
Clickable map of municipalities in the district

The Burgenlandkreis consists of the following subdivisions:

=== Free towns ===
The district's free towns are Hohenmölsen, Lützen, Naumburg, Teuchern, Weißenfels, and Zeitz.

=== Free municipalities ===
The only free municipality is Elsteraue.

=== Verbandsgemeinden ===
- An der Finne, consisting of the following municipalities:
  - An der Poststraße
  - Bad Bibra^{1, 2}
  - Eckartsberga^{2}
  - Finne
  - Finneland
  - Kaiserpfalz
  - Lanitz-Hassel-Tal
- Droyßiger-Zeitzer Forst, consisting of:
  - Droyßig^{1}
  - Gutenborn
  - Kretzschau
  - Schnaudertal
  - Wetterzeube
- Unstruttal, consisting of:
  - Balgstädt
  - Freyburg^{1, 2}
  - Gleina
  - Goseck
  - Karsdorf
  - Laucha an der Unstrut^{2}
  - Nebra^{2}
- Wethautal, consisting of:
  - Meineweh
  - Mertendorf
  - Molauer Land
  - Osterfeld^{1, 2}
  - Schönburg
  - Stößen^{2}
  - Wethau

^{1} seat of the Verbandsgemeinde ('association community'); ^{2} town
