= Zeune =

Zeune is a surname. Notable people with the surname include:

- August Zeune (1778–1853), German educator
- Johann Karl Zeune (1736–1788), German academic and philologist

== See also ==
- Zeuner
