= Balkans =

Region of southeastern Europe

- Geographical map of the Balkan Peninsula
- Interactive map of Balkans

Geography
- Location: Southeastern Europe
- Highest elevation: 2,925 m (9596 ft)
- Highest point: Musala (Bulgaria)

Administration
- See below

The Balkans (/ˈbɔːlkənz/ BAWL-kənz, /ˈbɒlkənz/ BOL-kənz), corresponding partially with the Balkan Peninsula, is a geographical area in southeastern Europe with various geographical and historical definitions. The region takes its name from the Balkan Mountains that stretch throughout the whole of Bulgaria. The Balkan Peninsula is bordered by the Adriatic Sea in the northwest, the Ionian Sea in the southwest, the Aegean Sea in the south, the Turkish Straits in the east, and the Black Sea in the northeast. The northern border of the peninsula is variously defined. The highest point of the Balkans is Musala, 2,925 metres (9,596 ft), in the Rila mountain range, Bulgaria.

The concept of the Balkan Peninsula was created by the German geographer August Zeune in 1808, who mistakenly considered the Balkan Mountains the dominant mountain system of southeastern Europe spanning from the Adriatic Sea to the Black Sea. In the 19th century the term Balkan Peninsula was a synonym for Rumelia, the parts of Europe that were provinces of the Ottoman Empire at the time. It had a geopolitical rather than a geographical definition, which was further promoted during the creation of Yugoslavia in the early 20th century. The definition of the Balkan Peninsula's natural borders does not coincide with the technical definition of a peninsula; hence modern geographers reject the idea of a Balkan Peninsula, while historical scholars usually discuss the Balkans as a region. The term has acquired a stigmatized and pejorative meaning related to the process of Balkanization. The region may alternatively be referred to as Southeast Europe.

The national borders of the Balkans are, due to many contrasting definitions, widely disputed, with no universal agreement on its components. By most definitions, the term encompasses Albania, Bosnia and Herzegovina, Bulgaria, Croatia (only the area south of the Sava and Kupa rivers), mainland Greece, Kosovo, Montenegro, North Macedonia, Romania (only Northern Dobruja), Serbia (only the area south of the Danube river), and East Thrace in Turkey. However, some broader definitions also include the remaining territories of Romania, Serbia, and Slovenia (in a limited or partial sense, though sources do not specify regions). Additionally, some definitions include Hungary and Moldova due to cultural and historical factors. The province of Trieste in northeastern Italy, whilst by some definitions on the geographical peninsula, is generally excluded from the Balkans in a regional context.

== Name ==
=== Etymology ===
The origin of the word Balkan is unknown; it may be related to Turkish bālk 'mud' (from Proto-Turkic *bal 'mud, clay; thick or gluey substance', cf. also Turkic bal 'honey'), and the Turkish suffix -an 'swampy forest' or Persian bālā-khāna 'big high house'. It was used mainly during the time of the Ottoman Empire. In both Ottoman Turkish and modern Turkish, balkan means 'chain of wooded mountains'.

=== Historical names and meaning ===
==== From antiquity to the early Middle Ages ====
The region that is presently known as the Balkans is largely the ancient (Europe's oldest) Danube civilisation, also referred to as the Old Europe civilization, which peaked between 5000 and 3500 BC.

From classical antiquity through the Middle Ages, the Balkan Mountains were called by the local Thracian name Haemus.

According to Greek mythology, the Thracian king Haemus was turned into a mountain by Zeus as a punishment, and the mountain has remained with his name. A reverse name scheme has also been suggested. The Bulgarian philologist Dimitar Dechev considered Haemus (Αἷμος) to be derived from the Thracian word *saimon 'mountain ridge'. A third possibility is that Haemus (Αἵμος) derives from the Greek word haima (αἷμα) 'blood'. The myth relates to a fight between Zeus and the monster/titan Typhon. Zeus injured Typhon with a thunderbolt, and Typhon's blood fell on the mountains, giving them their name.

==== Late Middle Ages and Ottoman period ====
The earliest mention of the name appears in an early 14th-century Arab map, in which the Haemus Mountains are referred to as Balkan. The first attested time the name "Balkan" was used in the West for the mountain range in Bulgaria was in a letter sent in 1490 to Pope Innocent VIII by Filippo Buonaccorsi, an Italian humanist, writer and diplomat. The Ottomans first mention it in a document dated from 1565. There has been no other documented usage of the word to refer to the region before that, although other Turkic tribes had already settled in or were passing through the region. There is also a claim about an earlier Bulgar Turkic origin of the word popular in Bulgaria, however it is only an unscholarly assertion. The word was used by the Ottomans in Rumelia in its general meaning of mountain, as in Kod̲j̲a-Balkan, Čatal-Balkan, and Ungurus-Balkani̊, but it was especially applied to the Haemus mountain. The name is still preserved in Central Asia with the Balkan Daglary (Balkan Mountains) and the Balkan Region of Turkmenistan. The English traveler John Bacon Sawrey Morritt introduced this term into English literature at the end of the 18th century, and other authors started applying the name to the wider area between the Adriatic and the Black Sea. The concept of the "Balkans" was created by the German geographer August Zeune in 1808, who mistakenly considered it as the dominant central mountain system of Southeast Europe spanning from the Adriatic Sea to the Black Sea. During the 1820s, "Balkan became the preferred although not yet exclusive term alongside Haemus among British travelers... Among Russian travelers not so burdened by classical toponymy, Balkan was the preferred term". In European books printed until late 1800s it was also known as the Illyrian Peninsula or Illyrische Halbinsel in German.

=== Evolution of meaning in the 19th and 20th centuries ===
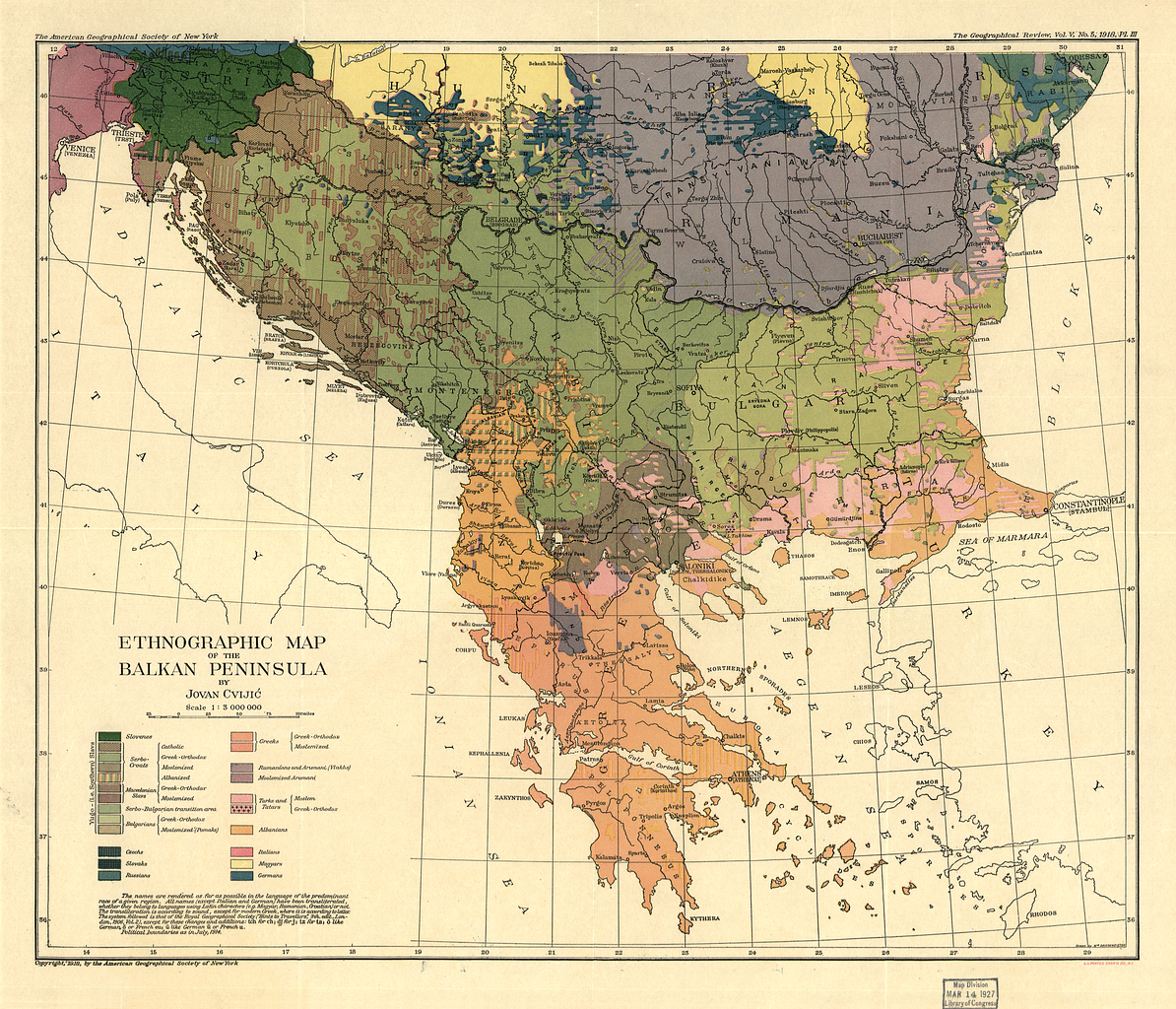
Map of the Balkan Peninsula from 1918 largely according to Jovan Cvijić

The term was not commonly used in geographical literature until the mid-19th century because, already then, scientists like Carl Ritter warned that only the part south of the Balkan Mountains could be considered as a peninsula and considered it to be renamed as "Greek peninsula". Other prominent geographers who did not agree with Zeune were Hermann Wagner, Theobald Fischer, Marion Newbigin, and Albrecht Penck, while Austrian diplomat Johann Georg von Hahn, in 1869, for the same territory, used the term Südosteuropäische Halbinsel ('Southeastern European peninsula'). Another reason it was not commonly accepted as the definition of then European Turkey had a similar land extent. However, after the Congress of Berlin (1878) there was a political need for a new term and gradually "the Balkans" was revitalized, but in many maps, the northern border was in Serbia and Montenegro and Greece was not included (it only depicted the then Ottoman-occupied parts of Europe), while Yugoslavian maps also included Croatia and Bosnia. At the time, the Balkan Peninsula was also understood as a synonym for Rumelia or European Turkey, and, in its broadest sense, encompassed the borders of all former Ottoman provinces in Europe.

The usage of the term changed in the very end of the 19th and beginning of the 20th century, when it was embraced by Serbian geographers, most prominently by Jovan Cvijić. It was done with political reasoning as affirmation for Serbian nationalism on the whole territory of the South Slavs, and also included anthropological and ethnological studies of the South Slavs through which were claimed various nationalistic and racialist theories. Through such policies and Yugoslavian maps the term was elevated to the modern status of a geographical region. The term acquired political nationalistic connotations far from its initial geographic meaning, arising from political changes from the late 19th century to the creation of post–World War I Yugoslavia (initially the Kingdom of Serbs, Croats and Slovenes in 1918). After the dissolution of Yugoslavia beginning in June 1991, the term Balkans acquired a negative political meaning, especially in Croatia and Slovenia, as well in worldwide casual usage for war conflicts and fragmentation of territory.

=== Southeast Europe ===
In part due to the historical and political connotations of the term Balkans, especially since the military conflicts of the 1990s in Yugoslavia in the western half of the region, the term Southeast Europe is becoming increasingly popular. A European Union (EU) initiative of 1999 is called the Stability Pact for Southeastern Europe. The online newspaper Balkan Times renamed itself Southeast European Times in 2003.

=== Current ===
In other languages of the Balkans, the region or peninsula are known as:

- Slavic languages:
  - Bulgarian and Macedonian: Балкански Полуостров, transliterated: Balkanski Poluostrov
  - Bosnian, Montenegrin and Serbian: Balkansko poluostrvo / Балканско полуострво
  - Bosnian and Croatian: Balkanski poluotok
  - Slovene: Balkanski polotok
- Romance languages:
  - Aromanian: Peninsula Balcanicã or Balcani
  - Romanian: Peninsula Balcanică or Balcani
  - Italian: Penisola balcanica or Balcani
- Other languages:
  - Albanian: Gadishulli Ballkanik and Siujdhesa e Ballkanit
  - Greek: Βαλκανική χερσόνησος, transliterated: Valkaniki chersonisos
  - Hungarian: Balkán-félsziget or Balkán
  - Turkish: Balkan Yarımadası or Balkanlar

== Definitions and boundaries ==
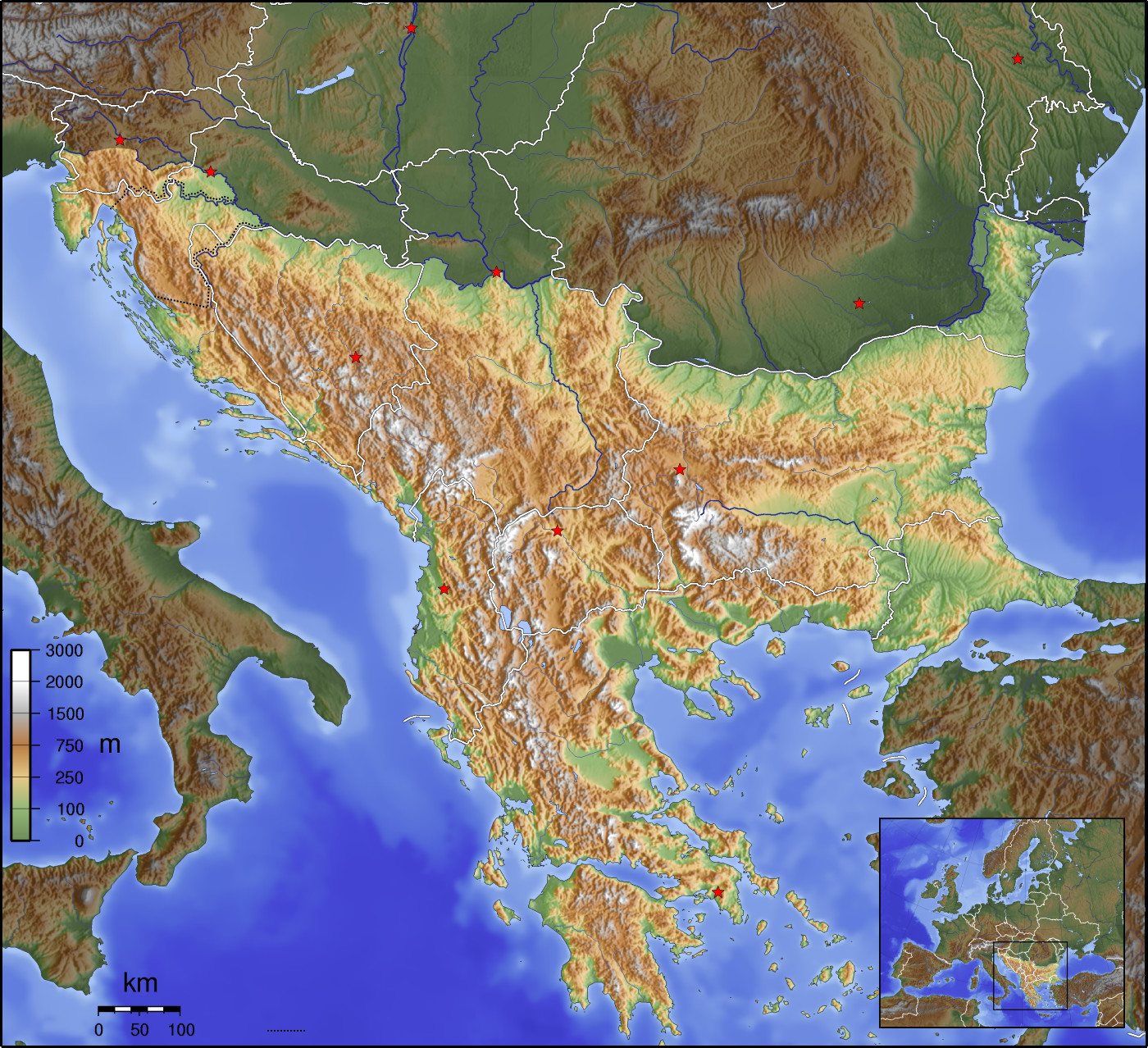
Topographic map of the Balkan Peninsula

=== Balkan Peninsula ===
The Balkan Peninsula is bounded by the Adriatic Sea to the west, the Mediterranean Sea (including the Ionian and Aegean seas) and the Sea of Marmara to the south and the Black Sea to the east. Its northern boundary is subject to varying interpretations, but is often given as the Danube, Sava and Kupa Rivers. The Balkan Peninsula has a combined area of about 470,000 km^{2} (181,000 sq mi). The peninsula is generally encompassed in the region known as Southeast Europe.

Italy currently holds a small area around Trieste that is by some older definitions considered a part of the Balkan Peninsula. However, the regions of Trieste and Istria are not usually considered part of the peninsula by Italian geographers, due to their definition limiting its western border to the Kupa River.

=== Balkans ===
The borders of the Balkans region are, due to a multitude of contrasting definitions, widely disputed, with no universal agreement on its components. By most definitions, it fully encompasses Albania, Bosnia and Herzegovina, Bulgaria, Croatia (only the area south of the Sava and Kupa rivers), mainland Greece, Kosovo, Montenegro, North Macedonia, Romania (only Northern Dobruja), Serbia (only the area south of the Danube river) and East Thrace in Turkey. However, some broader definitions also include the remaining territories of Romania, Serbia, and Slovenia (in a limited or partial sense, though sources do not specify regions) Additionally, some definitions include Hungary and Moldova due to cultural and historical factors. The Province of Trieste in northeastern Italy, whilst by some definitions on the geographical peninsula, is generally excluded from the Balkans in a regional context.

The term Southeast Europe may also be applied to the region, with various interpretations, although Balkan countries may alternatively be placed in Southern, Central or Eastern Europe. Turkey, including East Thrace, is generally placed in West Asia or the Middle East.

=== Western Balkans ===
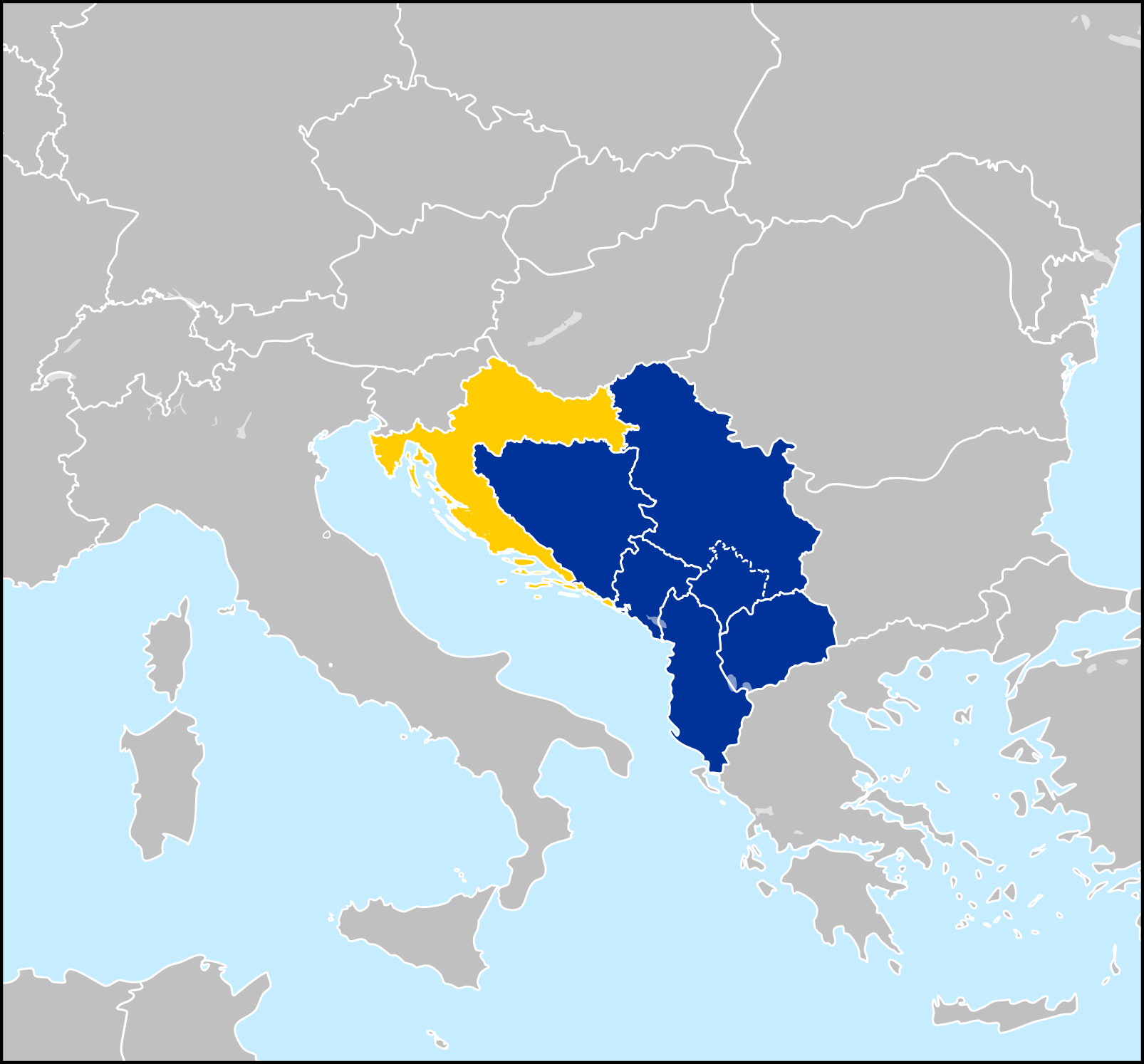
Western Balkan countries – Albania, Bosnia and Herzegovina, Croatia, Kosovo, Montenegro, North Macedonia, and Serbia. Croatia (yellow) joined the EU in 2013

The Western Balkans is a political neologism coined to refer to Albania and the territory of the former Yugoslavia, except Slovenia, since the early 1990s.^{[e]} The region of the Western Balkans, a coinage exclusively used in pan-European parlance, roughly corresponds to the Dinaric Alps territory.

The institutions of the EU have generally used the term Western Balkans to mean the Balkan area that includes countries that are not members of the EU, while others refer to the geographical aspects.^{[d]} Each of these countries aims to be part of the future enlargement of the EU and reach democracy and transmission scores but, until then, they will be strongly connected with the pre-EU waiting programme Central European Free Trade Agreement. Croatia, considered part of the Western Balkans, joined the EU in July 2013.

The region is sometimes alternatively referred to as Adria, to avoid the political nature of the term Western Balkans, mostly in business, and includes both EU members of Croatia and Slovenia.

=== Criticism as geographical definition ===
The term is scrutinised for having a geopolitical, rather than a geographical meaning and definition, as a multiethnic and political area in the southeastern part of Europe. The geographical term of a peninsula defines that the sea border must be longer than the land border, with the land side being the shortest in the triangle, but that is not the case for the Balkan Peninsula. Both the eastern and western sea catheti from Odesa to Cape Matapan (c. 1230–1350 km) and from Trieste to Cape Matapan (c. 1270–1285 km) are shorter than the land cathetus from Trieste to Odesa (c. 1330–1365 km). The land has too long a land border to qualify as a peninsula – Szczecin (920 km) and Rostock (950 km) at the Baltic Sea are closer to Trieste than Odesa yet it is not considered as another European peninsula. Since the late 19th and early 20th century no exact northern border has been clear, with an issue, whether the rivers are usable for its definition. In studies the Balkans' natural borders, especially the northern border, are often avoided to be addressed, considered as a problème fastidieux (delicate problem) by André Blanc in Géographie des Balkans (1965), while John Lampe and Marvin Jackman in Balkan Economic History (1971) noted that "modern geographers seem agreed in rejecting the old idea of a Balkan Peninsula". Another issue is the name: the Balkan Mountains, mostly in Northern Bulgaria, do not dominate the region by length and area as do the Dinaric Alps. An eventual Balkan peninsula can be considered a territory south of the Balkan Mountains, with a possible name "Greek-Albanian Peninsula". The term influenced the meaning of Southeast Europe which again is not properly defined by geographical factors.

Croatian geographers and academics are highly critical of inclusion of Croatia within the broad geographical, social-political and historical context of the Balkans, while the neologism Western Balkans is perceived as a humiliation of Croatia by the European political powers. According to M. S. Altić, the term has two different meanings, "geographical, ultimately undefined, and cultural, extremely negative, and recently strongly motivated by the contemporary political context". In 2018, President of Croatia Kolinda Grabar-Kitarović stated that the use of the term "Western Balkans" should be avoided because it does not imply only a geographic area, but also negative connotations, and instead must be perceived as and called Southeast Europe because it is part of Europe.

Slovenian philosopher Slavoj Žižek said of the definition,

This very alibi confronts us with the first of many paradoxes concerning Balkan: its geographic delimitation was never precise. It is as if one can never receive a definitive answer to the question, "Where does it begin?" For Serbs, it begins down there in Kosovo or Bosnia, and they defend the Christian civilization against this Europe's Other. For Croats, it begins with the Orthodox, despotic, Byzantine Serbia, against which Croatia defends the values of democratic Western civilization. For Slovenes, it begins with Croatia, and we Slovenes are the last outpost of the peaceful Mitteleuropa. For Italians and Austrians, it begins with Slovenia, where the reign of the Slavic hordes starts. For Germans, Austria itself, on account of its historic connections, is already tainted by Balkanic corruption and inefficiency. For some arrogant Frenchmen, Germany is associated with the Balkanian Eastern savagery—up to the extreme case of some conservative anti-European-Union Englishmen for whom, in an implicit way, it is ultimately the whole of continental Europe itself that functions as a kind of Balkan Turkish global empire with Brussels as the new Constantinople, the capricious despotic center threatening English freedom and sovereignty. So Balkan is always the Other: it lies somewhere else, always a little bit more to the southeast, with the paradox that, when we reach the very bottom of the Balkan peninsula, we again magically escape Balkan. Greece is no longer Balkan proper, but the cradle of our Western civilization.

== Nature and natural resources ==
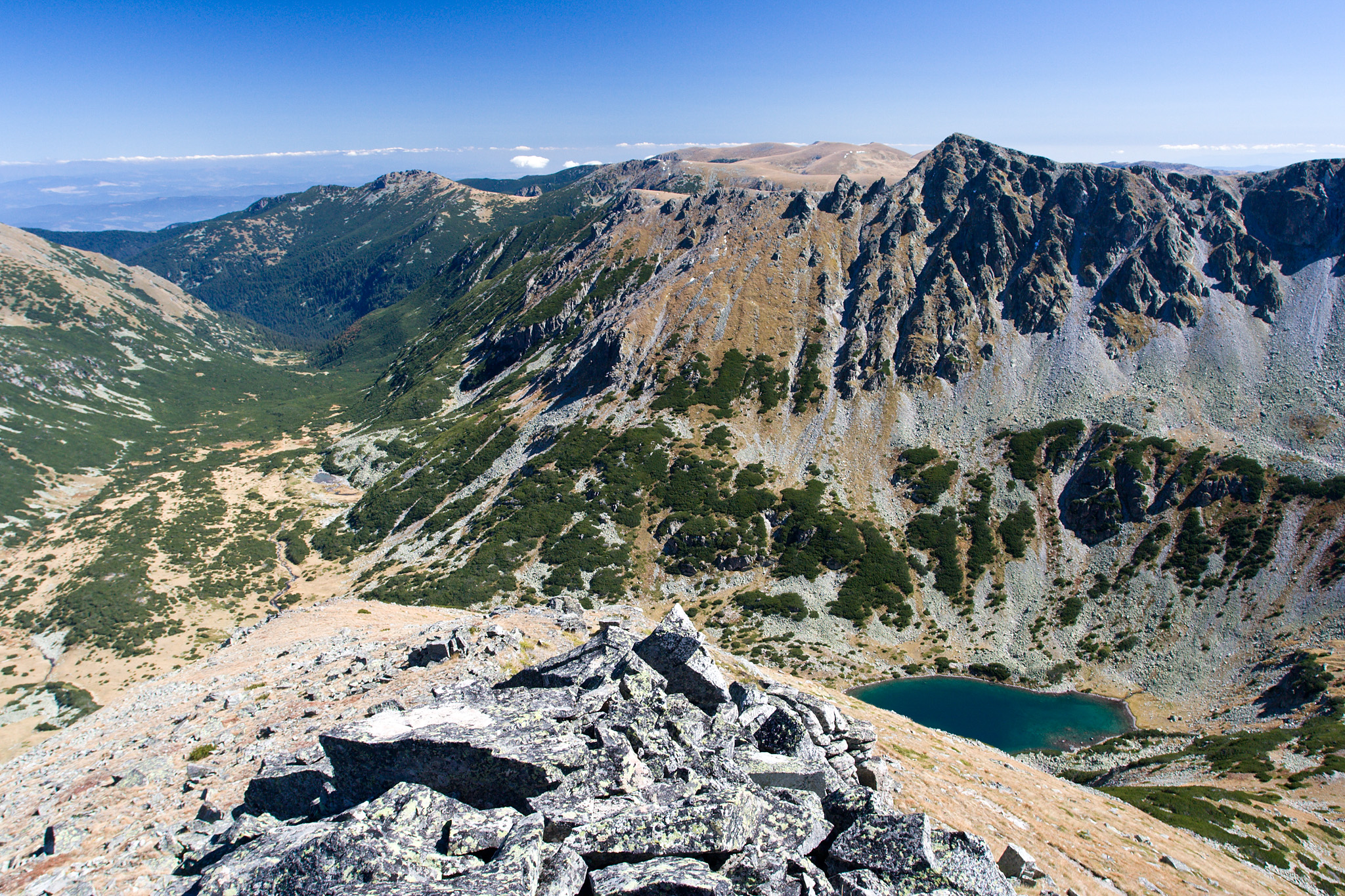
View toward Rila, the highest mountain range of the Balkans and Southeast Europe (2,925 m)

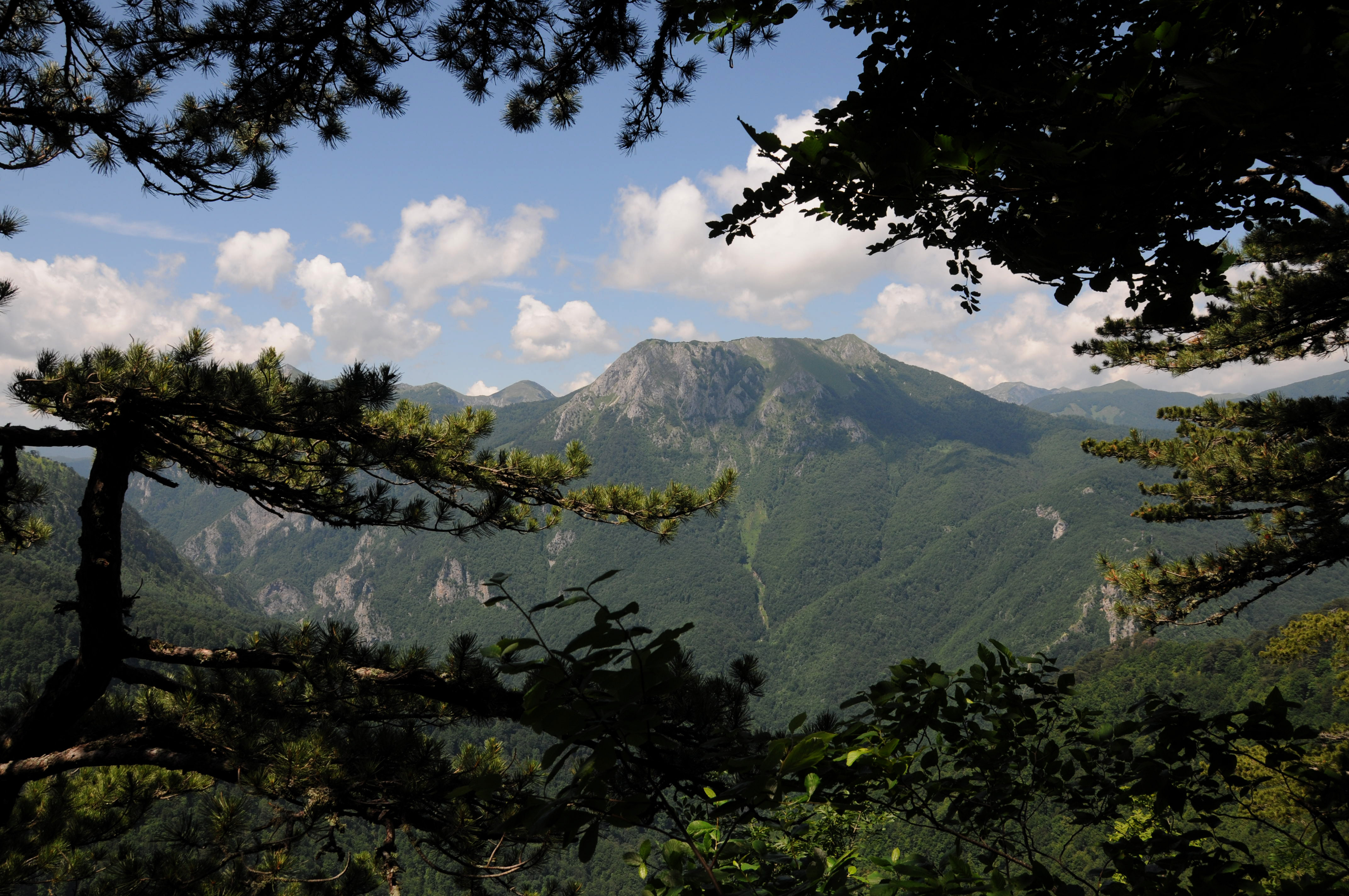
Sutjeska National Park contains Perućica, which is the largest primeval forest in the Balkans, and one of the last remaining in Europe

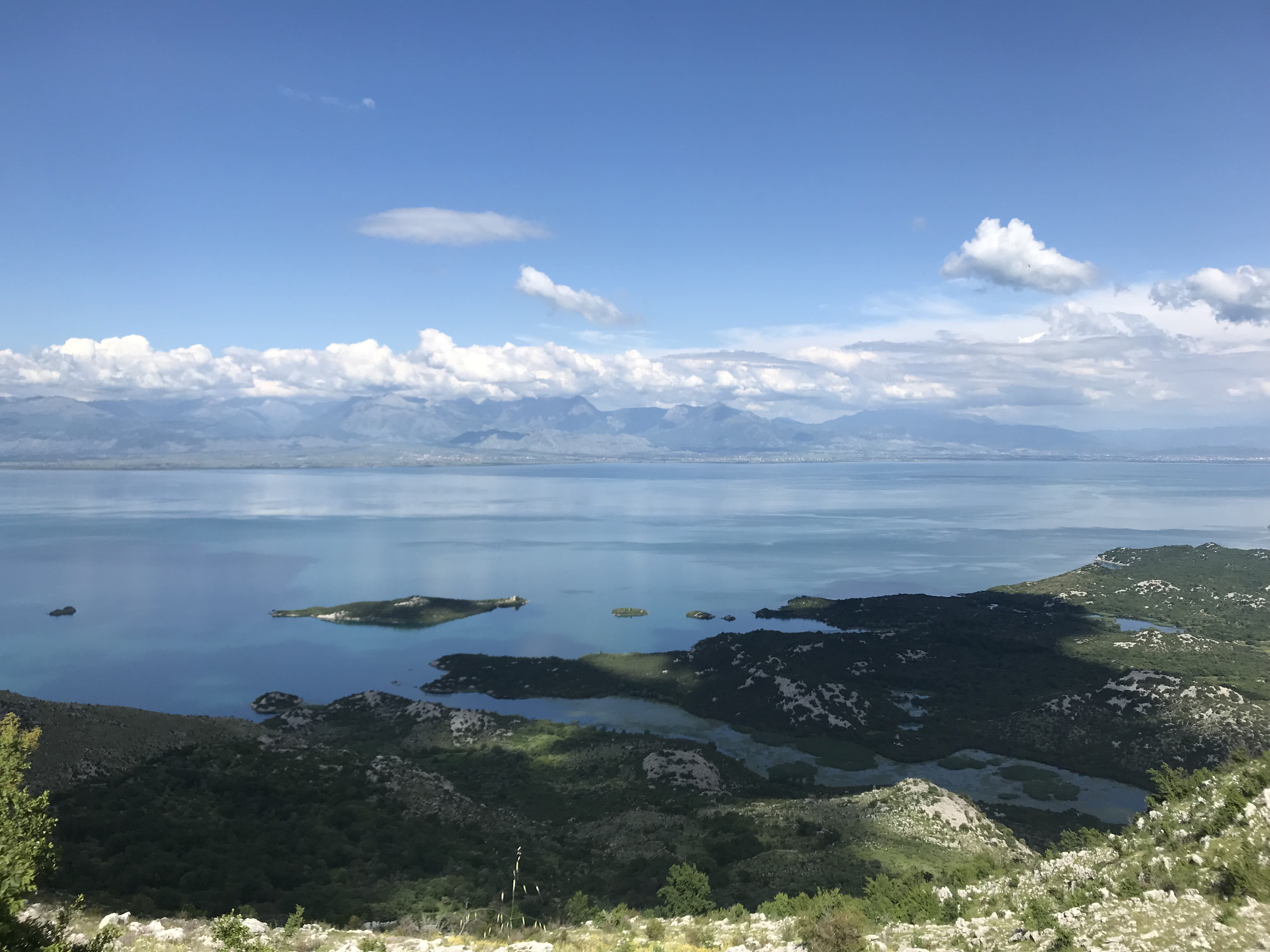
Lake Skadar is the largest lake in the Balkans and Southern Europe

Most of the area is covered by mountain ranges running from the northwest to southeast. The main ranges are the Balkan Mountains (Stara Planina in Bulgarian language), running from the Black Sea coast in Bulgaria to the border with Serbia, the Rila-Rhodope massif in southern Bulgaria, the Dinaric Alps in Bosnia and Herzegovina, Croatia and Montenegro, the Korab-Šar mountains which spreads from Kosovo to Albania and North Macedonia, and the Pindus range, spanning from southern Albania into central Greece and the Albanian Alps, and the Alps at the northwestern border. The highest mountain of the region is Rila in Bulgaria, with Musala at 2,925 m, second being Mount Olympus in Greece, with Mytikas at 2,917 m, and Pirin mountain with Vihren, also in Bulgaria, being the third at 2915 m. The karst field or polje is a common feature of the landscape.

On the Adriatic and Aegean coasts, the climate is Mediterranean, on the Black Sea coast the climate is humid subtropical and oceanic, and inland it is humid continental. In the northern part of the peninsula and on the mountains, winters are frosty and snowy, while summers are hot and dry. In the southern part, winters are milder. The humid continental climate is predominant in Bosnia and Herzegovina, northern Croatia, Bulgaria, Kosovo, northern Montenegro, the Republic of North Macedonia, and the interior of Albania and Serbia. Meanwhile, the other less common climates, the humid subtropical and oceanic climates, are seen on the Black Sea coast of Bulgaria and Balkan Turkey (European Turkey). The Mediterranean climate is seen on the Adriatic coasts of Albania, Croatia and Montenegro, as well as the Ionian coasts of Albania and Greece, in addition to the Aegean coasts of Greece and Balkan Turkey (European Turkey).

Over the centuries, forests have been cut down and replaced with bush. In the southern part and on the coast there is evergreen vegetation. Inland there are woods typical of Central Europe (oak and beech, and in the mountains, spruce, fir and pine). The tree line in the mountains lies at the height of 1,800–2,300 m. The land provides habitats for numerous endemic species, including extraordinarily abundant insects and reptiles that serve as food for a variety of birds of prey and rare vultures.

The soils are generally poor, except on the plains, where areas with natural grass, fertile soils and warm summers provide an opportunity for tillage. Elsewhere, land cultivation is mostly unsuccessful because of the mountains, hot summers and poor soils, although certain cultures such as olive and grape flourish.

Resources of energy are scarce, except in Kosovo, where considerable coal, lead, zinc, chromium and silver deposits are located. Other deposits of coal, especially in Bulgaria, Serbia and Bosnia, also exist. Lignite deposits are widespread in Greece. Petroleum scarce reserves exist in Greece, Serbia and Albania. Natural gas deposits are scarce. Hydropower is in wide use, from over 1,000 dams. The often relentless bora wind is also being harnessed for power generation.

Metal ores are more usual than other raw materials. Iron ore is rare, but in some countries there is a considerable amount of copper, zinc, tin, chromite, manganese, magnesite and bauxite. Some metals are exported.

== History and geopolitical significance ==
=== Antiquity ===
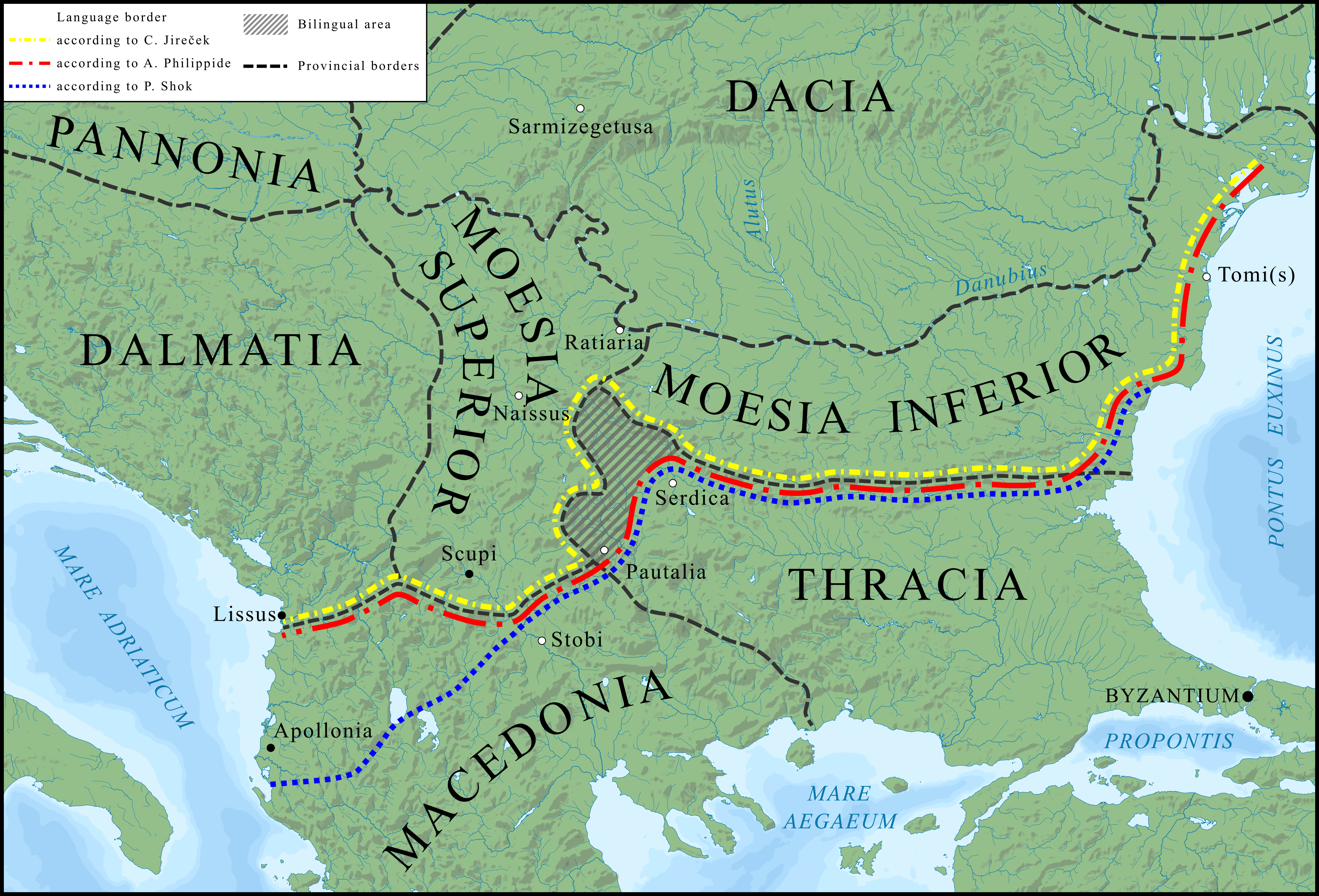
The Jireček Line

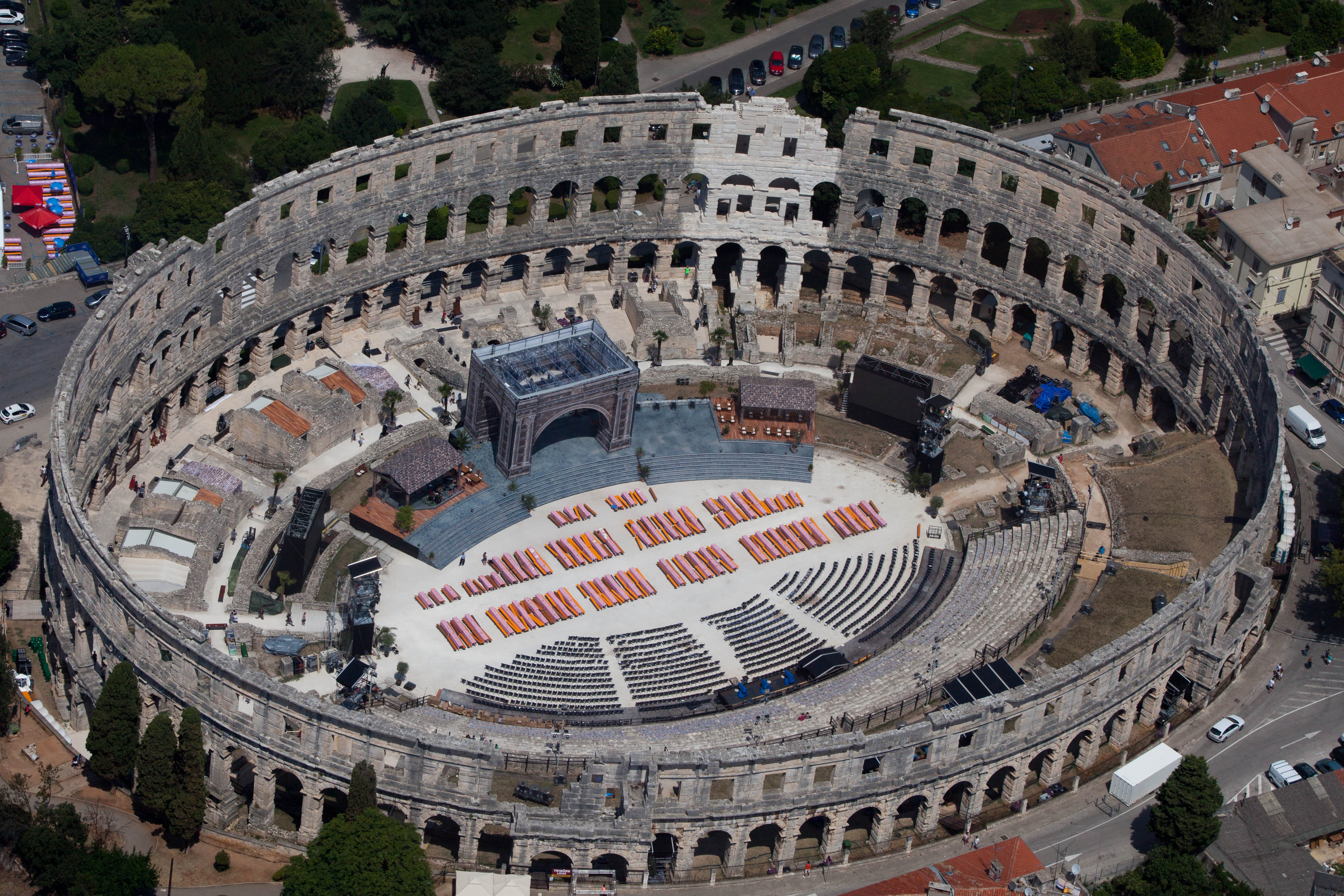
Pula Arena, the only remaining Roman amphitheatre to have four side towers and with all three Roman architectural orders entirely preserved

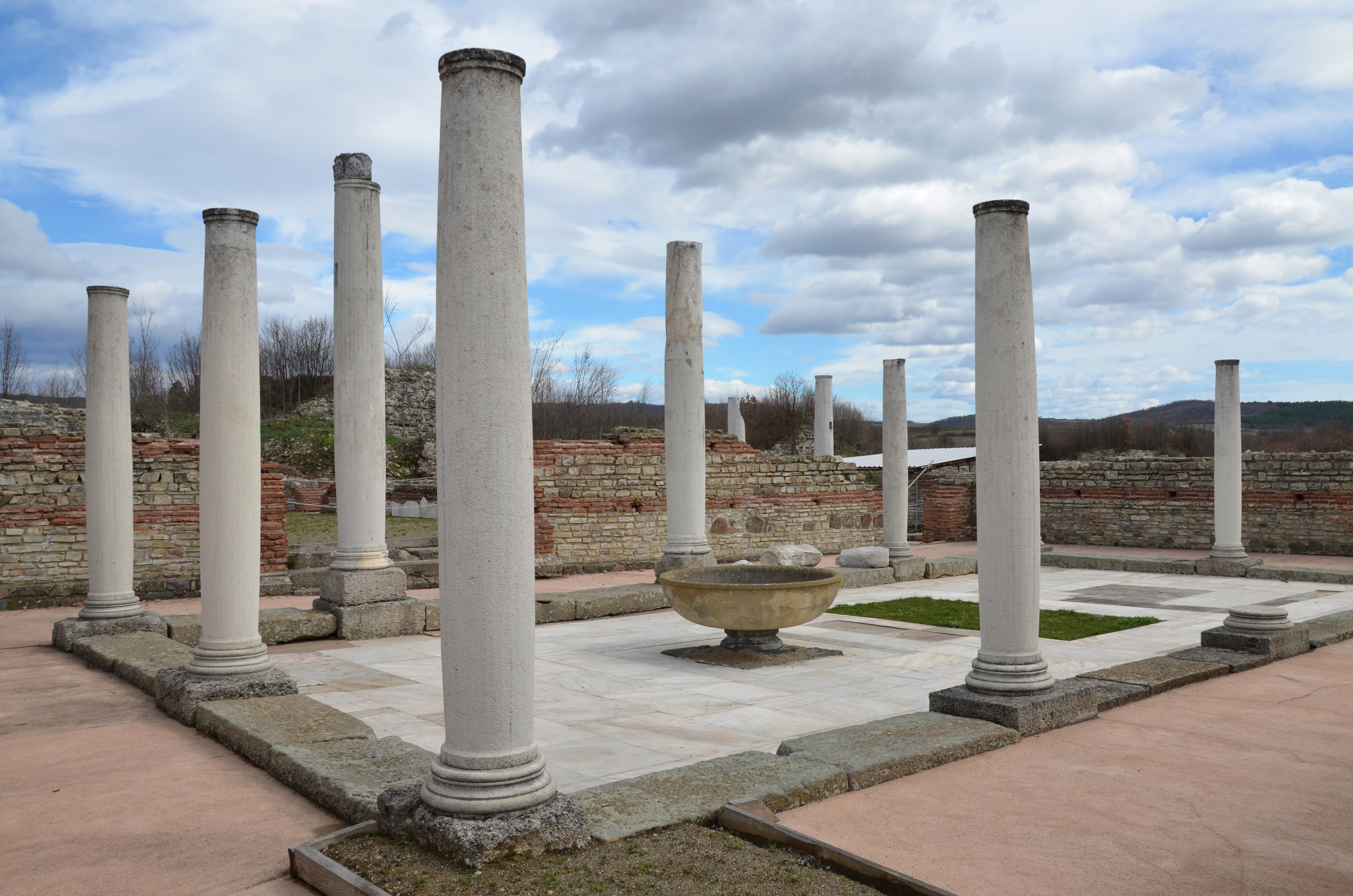
Remnants of the Felix Romuliana Imperial Palace, a UNESCO World Heritage Site

The Balkan region was the first area in Europe to experience the arrival of farming cultures in the Neolithic era. The Balkans have been inhabited since the Paleolithic and are the route by which farming from the Middle East spread to Europe during the Neolithic (7th millennium BC). The first known Neolithic culture of Old Europe was Kakanj culture that appeared in Central Bosnia's town of Kakanj and covered periods dated from 6795 to 4900 BC.

The practices of growing grain and raising livestock arrived in the Balkans from the Fertile Crescent by way of Anatolia and spread west and north into Central Europe, particularly through Pannonia. Two early culture-complexes have developed in the region, Starčevo culture and Vinča culture. The Balkans are also the location of the first advanced civilizations. Vinča culture developed a form of proto-writing before the Sumerians and Minoans, known as the Old European script, while the bulk of the symbols had been created in the period between 4500 and 4000 BC, with the ones on the Tărtăria clay tablets even dating back to around 5300 BC.

The identity of the Balkans is dominated by its geographical position; historically the area was known as a crossroads of cultures. It has been a juncture between the Latin and Greek bodies of the Roman Empire, the destination of a massive influx of pagan Bulgars and Slavs, an area where Orthodox and Catholic Christianity met, as well as the meeting point between Islam and Christianity.

Albanic, Hellenic, and other Palaeo-Balkan languages, had their formative core in the Balkans after the Indo-European migrations in the region. In pre-classical and classical antiquity, this region was home to Greeks, Illyrians, Paeonians, Thracians, Dacians, and other ancient groups. The Achaemenid Persian Empire incorporated parts of the Balkans comprising Macedonia, Thrace (parts of present-day eastern Bulgaria), and the Black Sea coastal region of Romania beginning in 512 BC. Following the Persian defeat in the Greco-Persian Wars in 479 BC, they abandoned all of their European territories, which regained their independence. During the reign of Philip II of Macedon (359-336 BC), Macedonia rose to become the most powerful state in the Balkans. In the second century BC, the Roman Empire conquered the region and spread Roman culture and the Latin language, but significant parts still remained under classical Greek influence. The only Paleo-Balkan languages that survived are Albanian and Greek. The Romans considered the Rhodope Mountains to be the northern limit of the Peninsula of Haemus and the same limit applied approximately to the border between Greek and Latin use in the region (later called the Jireček Line). However large spaces south of Jireček Line were and are inhabited by Vlachs (Aromanians), the Romance-speaking heirs of Roman Empire.

The Bulgars and Slavs arrived in the sixth-century and began assimilating and displacing already-assimilated (through Romanization and Hellenization) older inhabitants of the northern and central Balkans. This migration brought about the formation of distinct ethnic groups amongst the South Slavs, which included the Bulgarians, Croats and Serbs and Slovenes. Prior to the Slavic landing, parts of the western peninsula have been home to the Proto-Albanians. Including cities like Nish, Shtip, and Shkup. This can be proven through the development of the names, for example Naissos > Nish and Astibos > Shtip follow Albanian phonetic sound rules and have entered Slavic, indicating that Proto-Albanian was spoken in those cities prior to the Slavic invasion of the Balkans. Proto-Albanian speakers were Christianized under the Latin sphere of influence, specifically in the 4th century CE, as shown by the basic Christian terms in Albanian, which are of Latin origin and entered Proto-Albanian before the Gheg–Tosk dialectal diversification.

=== Middle Ages and Early modern period ===
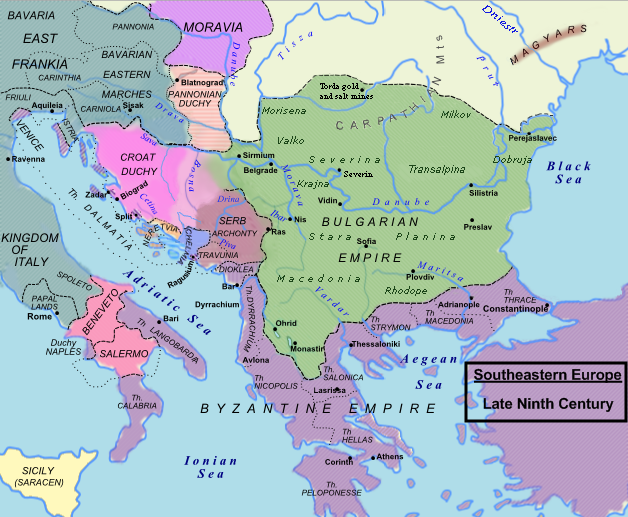
The Balkans in 850 AD

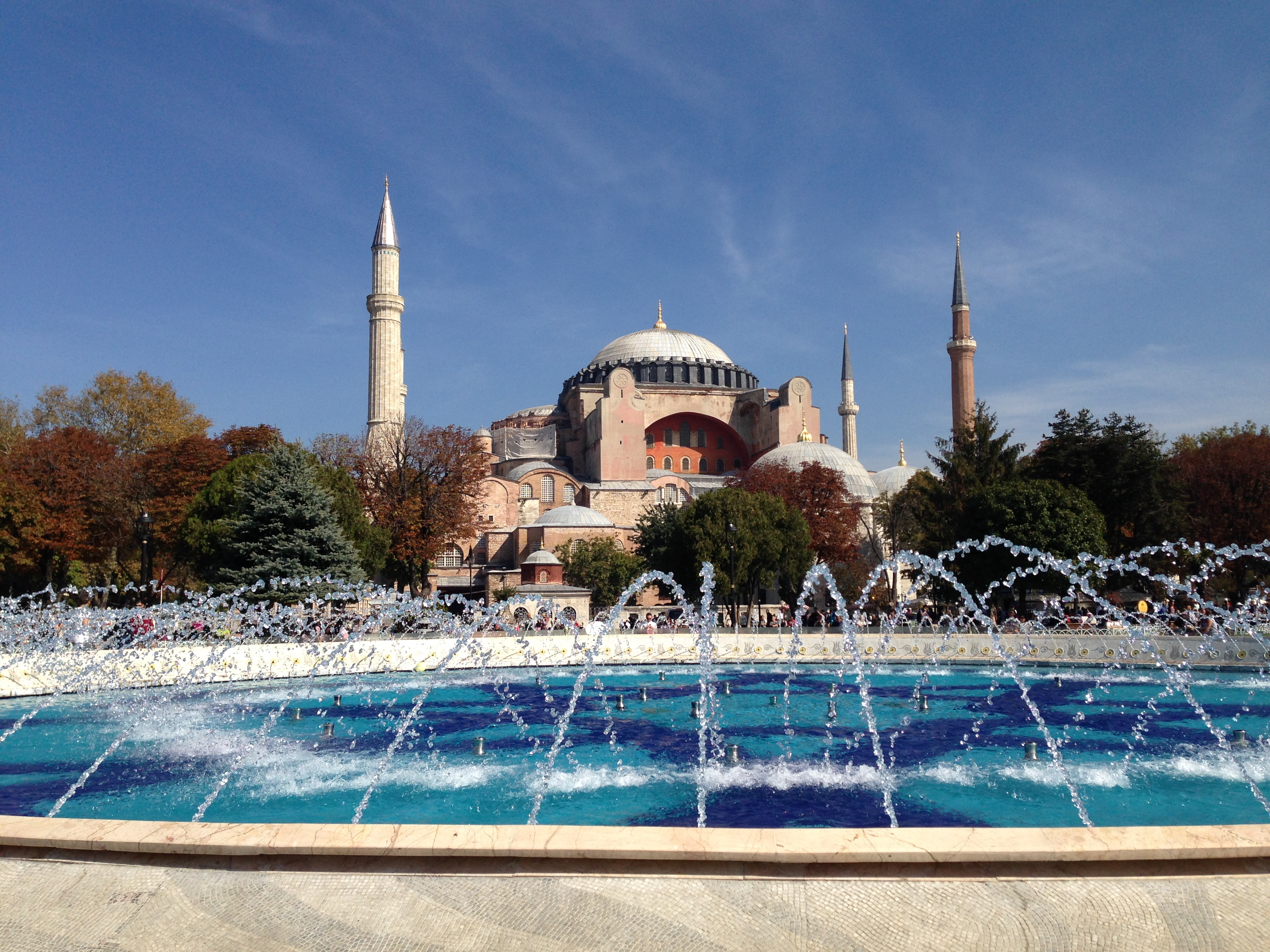
The Hagia Sophia, built in the 6th century Constantinople (now Istanbul, Turkey) as an Eastern Orthodox cathedral, later it became a mosque, then a museum, and now its both a mosque and a museum

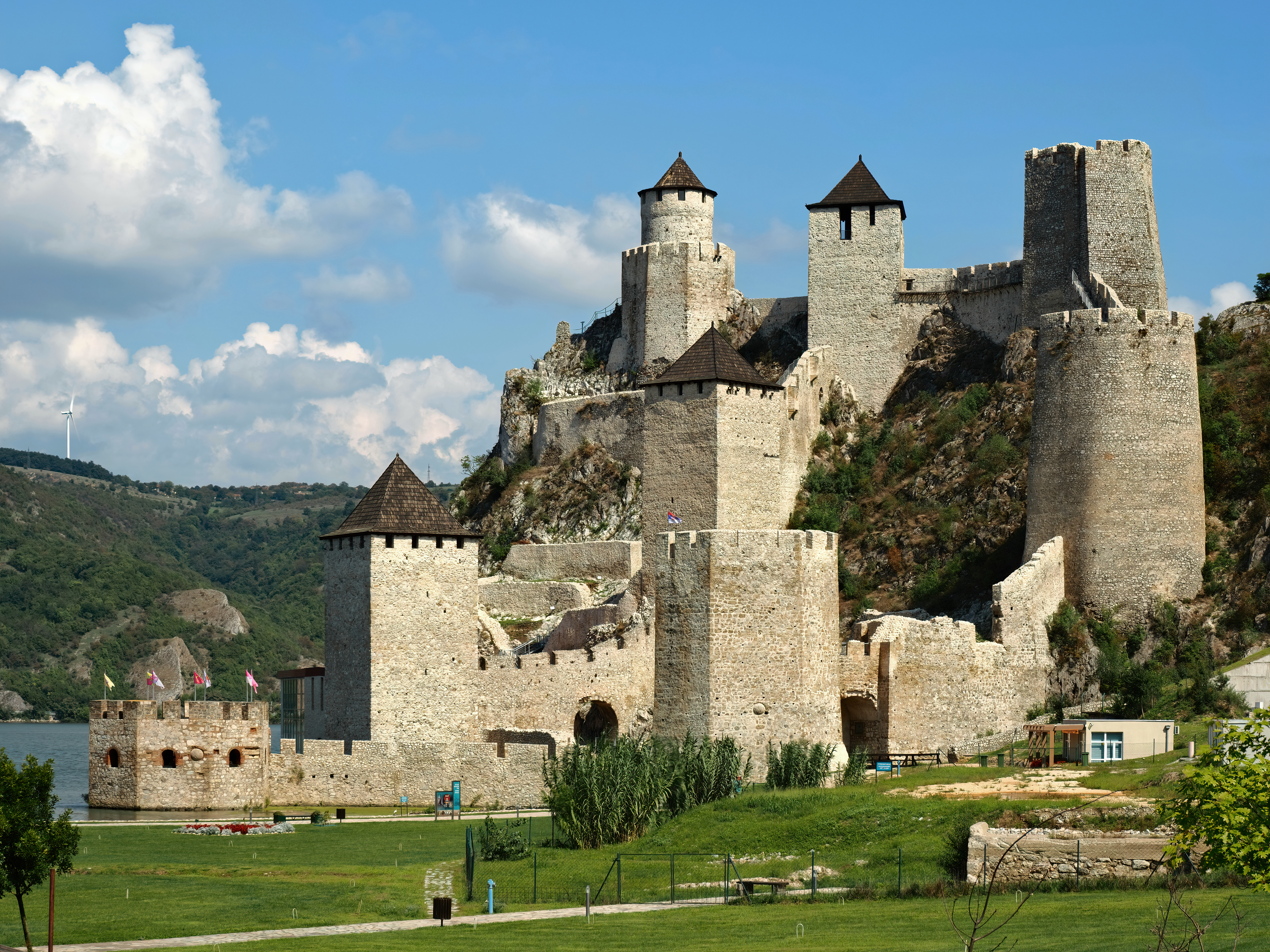
The Golubac Fortress, built in the 14th century to overlook the strategically important Iron Gates gorge, was one of the many Balkan fortresses built in the Middle Ages to resist invading forces

During the Early Middle Ages, The Byzantine Empire was the dominant state in the region, both military and culturally. Their cultural strength became particularly evident in the second half of the 9th century when the Byzantine missionaries Cyril and Methodius managed to spread the Byzantine variant of Christianity to the majority of the Balkans inhabitants who were pagan beforehand. Initially, it was adopted by the Bulgarians and Serbs, with the Romanians joining a bit later. The lack of Old Church Slavonic terms in Albanian Christian terminology shows that the missionary activities during the Christianization of the Slavs did not involve Albanian-speakers; Christianity survived through the centuries and had already become an important cultural element in their ethnic identity.

Byzantine control over the Balkans weakened as a result of Slavic migrations and the emergence of the First Bulgarian Empire and the subsequent string of disastrous defeats the Byzantine Empire suffered. Towards the end of the 10th century, however, the Empire mounted a counteroffensive against the weakened Bulgarians, culminating in the conquest of the Bulgarian Empire in 1018. The Byzantines lost power in the Balkans once again after the resurgence of the Bulgarians in the late 12th century and the formation of the Second Bulgarian Empire. Profiting from the subsequent dissolution of the Byzantine Empire, the Second Bulgarian Empire triumphed over its adversaries, becoming the dominating power in the region under its Emperor (Tsar) Ivan Asen II. As a result of internal conflicts, Mongol raids and the resurgence of the Byzantine Empire, the Second Bulgarian Empire then declined once more following the death of Ivan Asen II. In the first half of the 14th century, both traditional great powers were eventually overshadowed by the ascent of Serbia under Stefan Dušan, who created the Serbian Empire.

The Ottoman expansion in the region began in the second half of the 14th century, as the Byzantine Empire, already much reduced in territory, suffered several defeats from the Ottomans. In 1362, the Ottoman Turks conquered Adrianople (now Edirne, Turkey), which became the Ottoman capital. At this point, the Serbian Empire had started to disintegrate, and was gradually incorporated into the Ottoman state following the Battle of Kosovo in 1389, and finally with the Siege of Smederevo in 1459. Bulgaria fell in 1396, with the conquest of Vidin, followed by the Byzantine Empire in 1453, Bosnia in 1463, Herzegovina in 1482, and Montenegro in 1496. The conquest was made easier for the Ottomans due to existing divisions among the Orthodox peoples and by the even deeper rift that had existed at the time between the Eastern and Western Christians of Europe.

The Albanians under Skanderbeg's leadership resisted the Ottomans for a time (1443–1468) by using guerilla warfare. Skanderbeg's achievements, in particular the Battle of Albulena and the First Siege of Krujë won him fame across Europe. The Ottomans eventually conquered the near entirety of the Balkans and reached central Europe by the early 16th century. Some smaller countries, such as Montenegro managed to retain some autonomy by managing their own internal affairs, since the territory was too mountainous to completely subdue. Another small country that retained its independence, both de facto and de jure in this case, was the Adriatic trading hub of Ragusa (now Dubrovnik, Croatia).

By the end of the 16th century, the Ottoman Empire had become the controlling force in the region after expanding from Anatolia through Thrace to the Balkans. Many people in the Balkans place their greatest folk heroes in the era of either the onslaught or the retreat of the Ottoman Empire. As examples, for Greeks, Constantine XI Palaiologos and Kolokotronis; and for Serbs, Miloš Obilić, Tsar Lazar and Karađorđe; for Albanians, George Kastrioti Skanderbeg; for ethnic Macedonians, Nikola Karev and Goce Delčev; for Bulgarians, Vasil Levski, Georgi Sava Rakovski and Hristo Botev and for Croats, Nikola Šubić Zrinjski.

In the past several centuries, because of the frequent Ottoman wars in Europe fought in and around the Balkans and the comparative Ottoman isolation from the mainstream of economic advance (reflecting the shift of Europe's commercial and political centre of gravity towards the Atlantic), the Balkans have been the least developed part of Europe. According to Halil İnalcık, "The population of the Balkans, according to one estimate, fell from a high of 8 million in the late 16th-century to only 3 million by the mid-eighteenth. This estimate is based on Ottoman documentary evidence".

Most of the Balkan nation-states emerged during the 19th and early 20th centuries as they gained independence from the Ottoman or Habsburg empires: Greece in 1821, Serbia and Montenegro in 1878, Romania in 1881, Bulgaria in 1908 and Albania in 1912.

=== Recent history ===
Modern political history of the Balkans from 1796 onwards

==== World wars ====
In 1912–1913, the First Balkan War broke out when the nation-states of Bulgaria, Serbia, Greece and Montenegro united in an alliance against the Ottoman Empire. As a result of the war, almost all remaining European territories of the Ottoman Empire were captured and partitioned among the allies. Ensuing events also led to the creation of an independent Albanian state. Bulgaria insisted on its status quo territorial integrity, divided and shared by the Great Powers next to the Russo-Turkish War (1877–78) in other boundaries and on the pre-war Bulgarian-Serbian agreement. Bulgaria was provoked by the backstage deals between its former allies, Serbia and Greece, on the allocation of the spoils at the end of the First Balkan War. At the time, Bulgaria was fighting at the main Thracian Front. Bulgaria marks the beginning of Second Balkan War when it attacked them. The Serbs and the Greeks repulsed single attacks, but when the Greek army invaded Bulgaria together with an unprovoked Romanian intervention in the back, Bulgaria collapsed. The Ottoman Empire used the opportunity to recapture Eastern Thrace, establishing its new western borders that still stand today as part of modern Turkey.

World War I was sparked in the Balkans in 1914 when members of Young Bosnia, a revolutionary organization with predominantly Serb and pro-Yugoslav members, assassinated the Austro-Hungarian heir Archduke Franz Ferdinand of Austria in Bosnia and Herzegovina's capital, Sarajevo. That caused a war between Austria-Hungary and Serbia, which—through the existing chains of alliances—led to the World War I. The Ottoman Empire soon joined the Central Powers becoming one of the three empires participating in that alliance. The next year Bulgaria joined the Central Powers attacking Serbia, which was successfully fighting Austria-Hungary to the north for a year. That led to Serbia's defeat and the intervention of the Entente in the Balkans which sent an expeditionary force to establish a new front, the third one of that war, which soon also became static. The participation of Greece in the war three years later, in 1918, on the part of the Entente finally altered the balance between the opponents leading to the collapse of the common German-Bulgarian front there, which caused the exit of Bulgaria from the war, and in turn, the end of World War I and the collapse of the Austro-Hungarian Empire.

Between the two wars, in order to maintain the geopolitical status quo in the region after the end of World War I, the Balkan Pact, or Balkan Entente, was formed by a treaty between Greece, Romania, Turkey and Yugoslavia on 9 February 1934 in Athens.

With the start of the World War II, all Balkan countries, with the exception of Greece, were allies of Nazi Germany, having bilateral military agreements or being part of the Axis Pact. Fascist Italy expanded the war in the Balkans by using its protectorate Albania to invade Greece. After repelling the attack, the Greeks counterattacked, invading Italy-held Albania and causing Nazi Germany's intervention in the Balkans to help its ally. Days before the German invasion, a successful coup d'état in Belgrade by neutral military personnel seized power.

Although the new government reaffirmed its intentions to fulfill its obligations as a member of the Axis, Germany, with Bulgaria, invaded both Greece and Yugoslavia. Yugoslavia immediately disintegrated when those loyal to the Serbian King and the Croatian units mutinied. Greece resisted, but, after two months of fighting, collapsed and was occupied. The two countries were partitioned between the three Axis allies, Bulgaria, Germany and Italy, and the Independent State of Croatia, a puppet state of Italy and Germany.

During the occupation, the population suffered considerable hardship due to repression and starvation, to which the population reacted by creating a mass resistance movement. Together with the early and extremely heavy winter of that year (which caused hundreds of thousands of deaths among the poorly fed population), the German invasion had disastrous effects in the timetable of the planned invasion in Russia causing a significant delay, which had major consequences during the course of the war.

Franklin D. Roosevelt and Joseph Stalin refused Winston Churchill's suggestion to invade the Balkans, which could have denied Germany petroleum, forestalled the advance of the Red Army, and achieved a superior negotiating position in postwar Europe; Operation Dragoon was executed instead, in Southern France. Finally, at the end of 1944, the Soviets entered Romania and Bulgaria forcing the Germans out of the Balkans. They left behind a region largely ruined as a result of wartime exploitation.

==== Cold War ====
During the Cold War, most of the countries on the Balkans were governed by communist governments. Greece became the first battleground of the emerging Cold War. The Truman Doctrine was the US response to the civil war, which raged from 1944 to 1949. This civil war, unleashed by the Communist Party of Greece, backed by communist volunteers from neighboring countries (Albania, Bulgaria and Yugoslavia), led to massive American assistance for the non-communist Greek government. With this backing, Greece managed to defeat the partisans and, ultimately, remained one of the two only non-communist countries in the region with Turkey.

However, despite being under communist governments, Yugoslavia (1948) and Albania (1961) fell out with the Soviet Union. Yugoslavia, led by Marshal Josip Broz Tito (1892–1980), first propped up then rejected the idea of merging with Bulgaria and instead sought closer relations with the West, later even spearheaded, together with India and Egypt the Non-Aligned Movement. Albania on the other hand gravitated toward Communist China, later adopting an isolationist position.

On 28 February 1953, Greece, Turkey and Yugoslavia signed the treaty of Agreement of Friendship and Cooperation in Ankara to form the Balkan Pact of 1953. The treaty's aim was to deter Soviet expansion in the Balkans and eventual creation of a joint military staff for the three countries. When the pact was signed, Turkey and Greece were members of the NATO, while Yugoslavia was a non-aligned communist state. With the Pact, Yugoslavia was able to indirectly associate itself with NATO. Though it was planned for the pact to remain in force for 20 years, it dissolved in 1960.

As the only non-communist countries, Greece and Turkey were (and still are) part of NATO composing the southeastern wing of the alliance.

==== Post–Cold War ====
In the 1990s, the transition of the regions' ex-Eastern bloc countries towards democratic free-market societies went peacefully. While in the non-aligned Yugoslavia, Wars between the former Yugoslav republics broke out after Slovenia and Croatia held free elections and their people voted for independence on their respective countries' referendums. Serbia, in turn, declared the dissolution of the union as unconstitutional and the Yugoslav People's Army unsuccessfully tried to maintain the status quo. Slovenia and Croatia declared independence on 25 June 1991, which prompted the Croatian War of Independence in Croatia and the Ten-Day War in Slovenia. The Yugoslav forces eventually withdrew from Slovenia in 1991 while the war in Croatia continued until late 1995. The two were followed by Macedonia and later Bosnia and Herzegovina, with Bosnia being the most affected by the fighting. The wars prompted the United Nations' intervention and NATO ground and air forces took action against Serb forces in Bosnia and Herzegovina and FR Yugoslavia (i.e. Serbia and Montenegro).

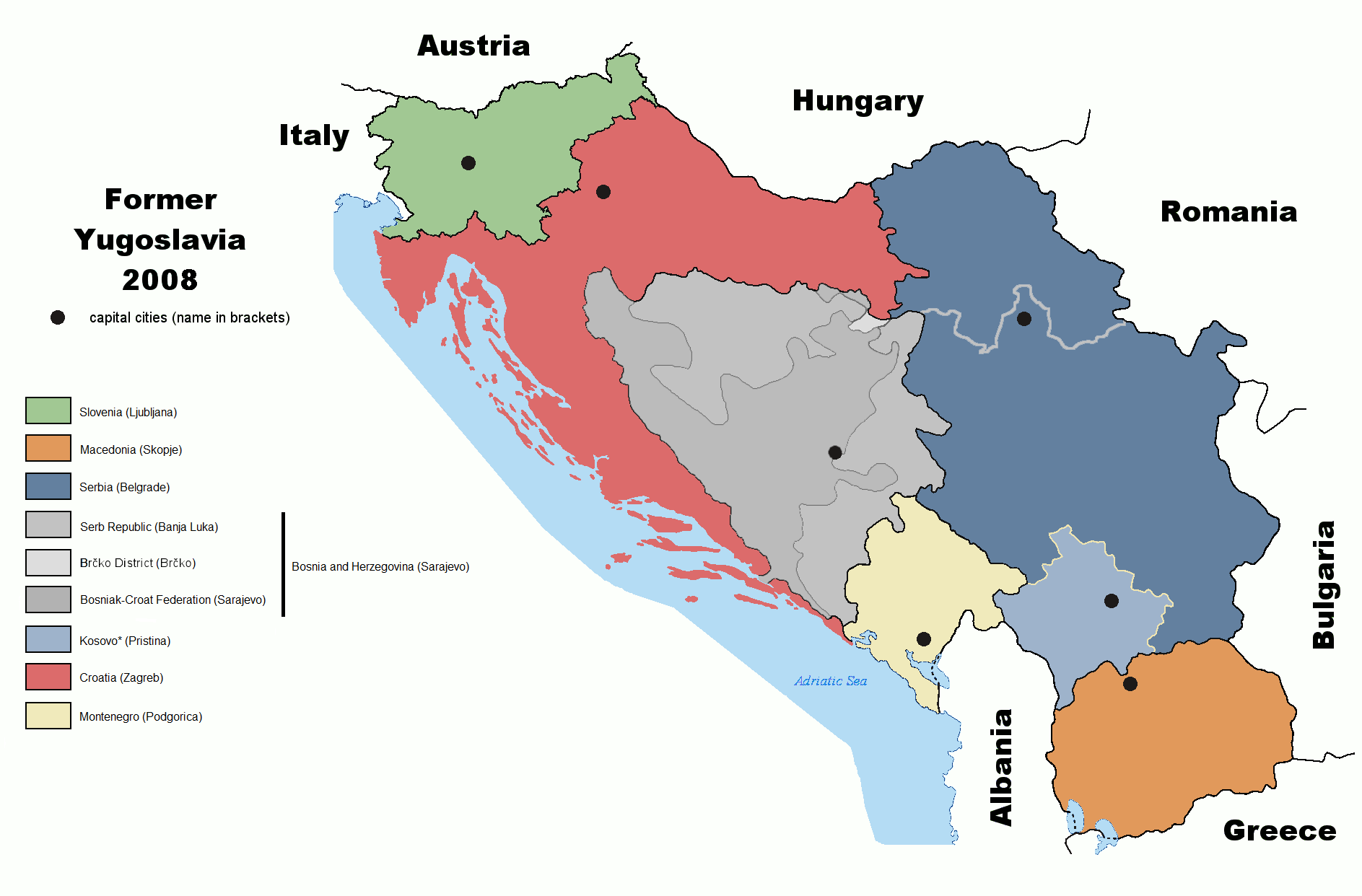
State entities on the former territory of Yugoslavia, 2008

From the dissolution of Yugoslavia, six states achieved internationally recognized sovereignty: Slovenia, Croatia, Bosnia and Herzegovina, North Macedonia, Montenegro and Serbia; all of them are traditionally included in the Balkans which is often a controversial matter of dispute. In 2008, while under UN administration, Kosovo declared independence (according to the official Serbian policy, Kosovo is still an internal autonomous region). In July 2010, the International Court of Justice, ruled that the declaration of independence was legal. Most UN member states recognise Kosovo. After the end of the wars a revolution broke in Serbia and Slobodan Milošević, the Serbian communist leader (elected president between 1989 and 2000), was overthrown and handed for a trial to the International Criminal Tribunal for crimes against the International Humanitarian Law during the Yugoslav wars. Milošević died of a heart attack in 2006 before a verdict could have been released. Ιn 2001 an Albanian uprising in Macedonia (North Macedonia) forced the country to give local autonomy to the ethnic Albanians in the areas where they predominate.

With the dissolution of Yugoslavia, an issue emerged over the name under which the former (federated) republic of Macedonia would internationally be recognized, between the new country and Greece. Being the Macedonian part of Yugoslavia (see Vardar Macedonia), the federated republic under the Yugoslav identity had the name (Socialist) Republic of Macedonia on which it declared its sovereignty in 1991. Greece, having a large homonymous region (see Macedonia), opposed the usage of the name as an indication of a nationality and ethnicity. Thus dubbed Macedonia naming dispute was resolved under UN mediation in the June 2018 Prespa agreement was reached, which saw the country's renaming into North Macedonia in 2019.

Balkan countries control the direct land routes between Western Europe and South-West Asia (Asia Minor and the Middle East). Since 2000, all Balkan countries are friendly towards the EU and the US.

Greece has been a member of the EU since 1981, while Slovenia is a member since 2004, Bulgaria and Romania are members since 2007, and Croatia is a member since 2013. In 2005, the EU decided to start accession negotiations with candidate countries; Turkey, and North Macedonia were accepted as candidates for EU membership. In 2012, Montenegro started accession negotiations with the EU. In 2014, Albania is an official candidate for accession to the EU. In 2015, Serbia was expected to start accession negotiations with the EU, however this process has been stalled over the recognition of Kosovo as an independent state by existing EU member states.

Greece and Turkey have been NATO members since 1952. In March 2004, Bulgaria, Romania and Slovenia have become members of NATO. As of April 2009, Albania and Croatia are members of NATO. Montenegro joined in June 2017. North Macedonia became a NATO member on 27 March 2020.

Almost all other countries have expressed a desire to join the EU, NATO, or both at some point in the future.

== Economy ==
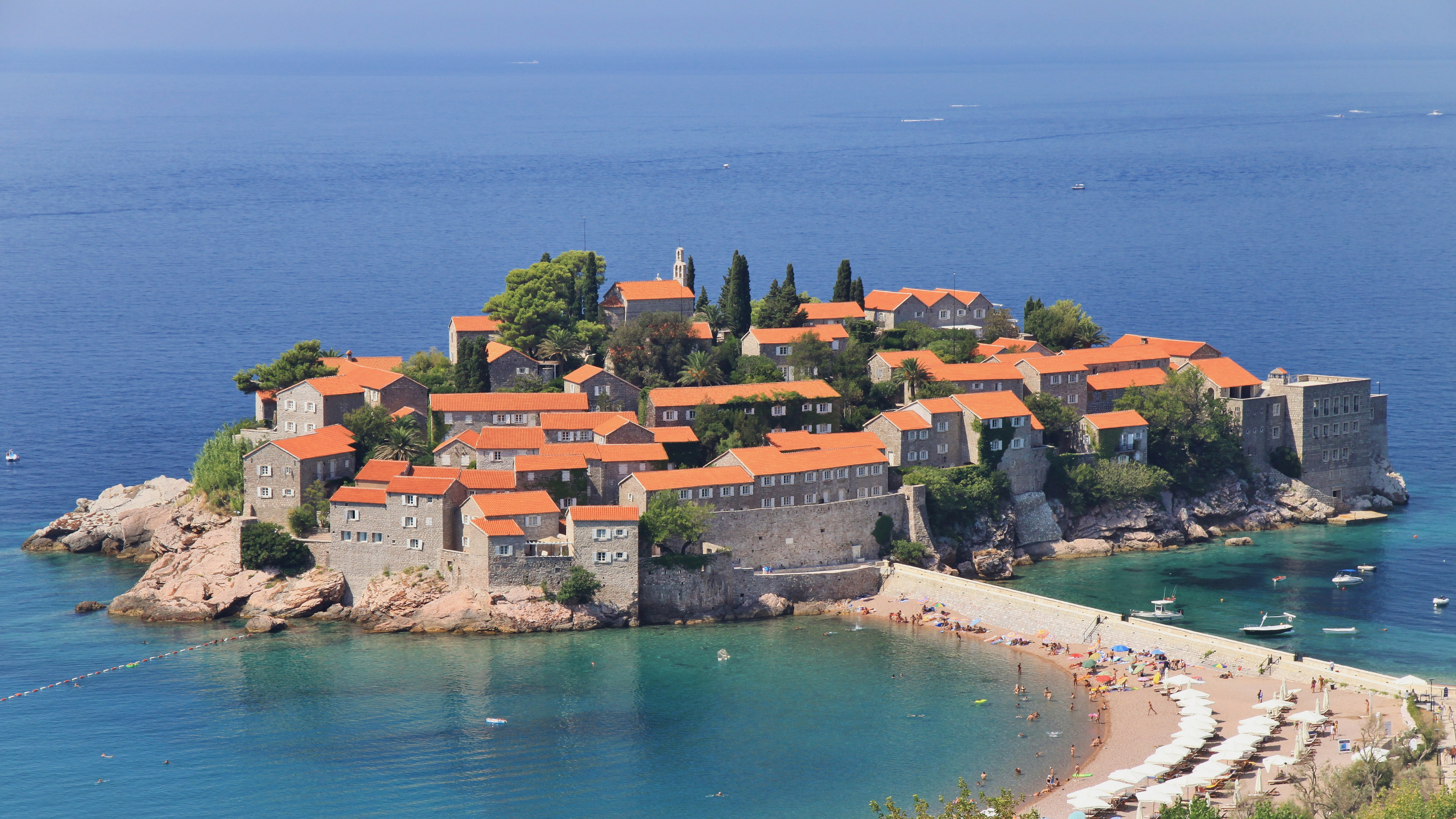
A view towards Sveti Stefan in Montenegro, tourism makes up a significant portion of the Montenegrin economy

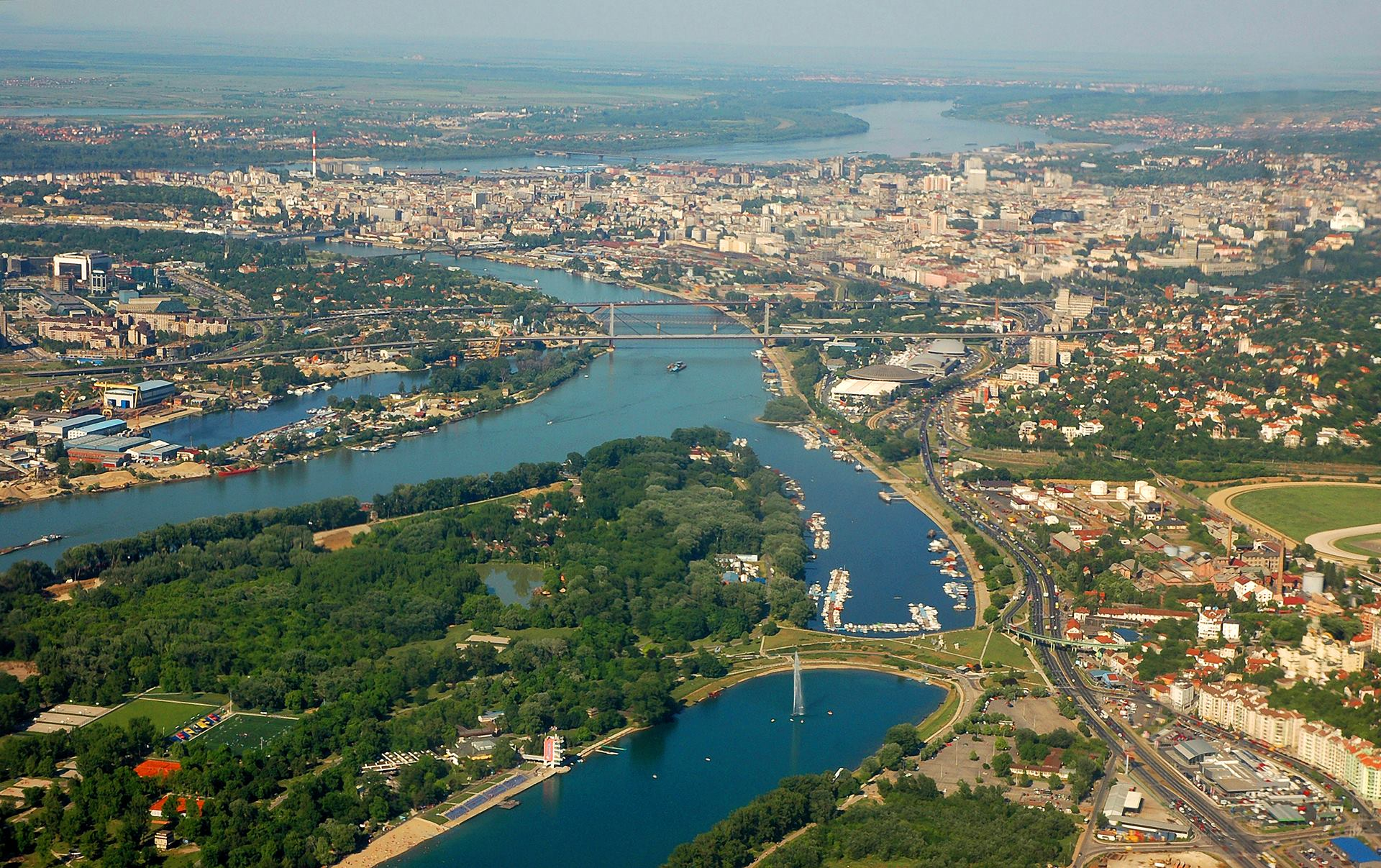
A view above Belgrade in Serbia, which is the capital of Serbia and a major industrial city that accounts for a large component of the Serbian economy

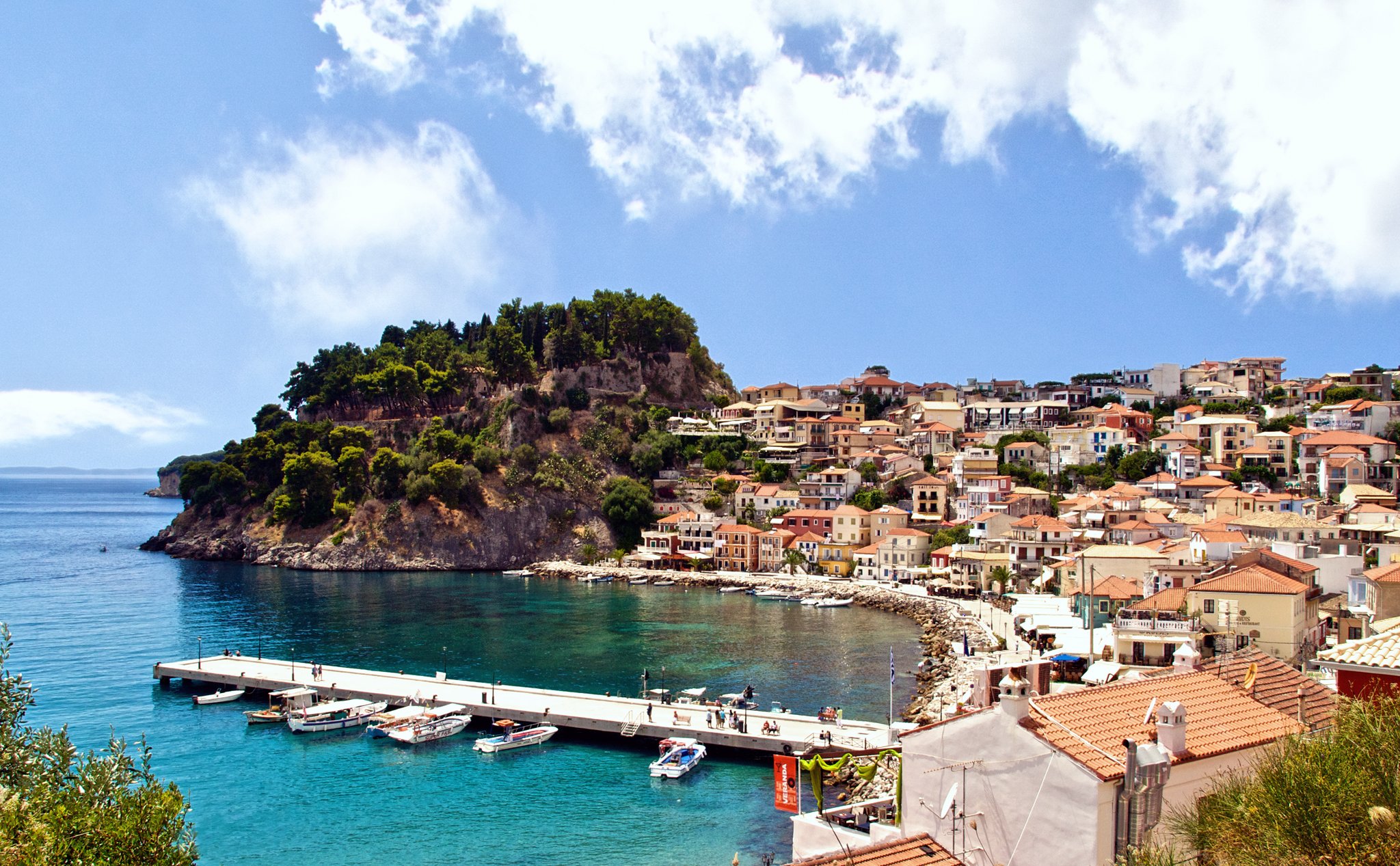
A view towards Parga in Greece; tourism plays a crucial role in the Greek economy

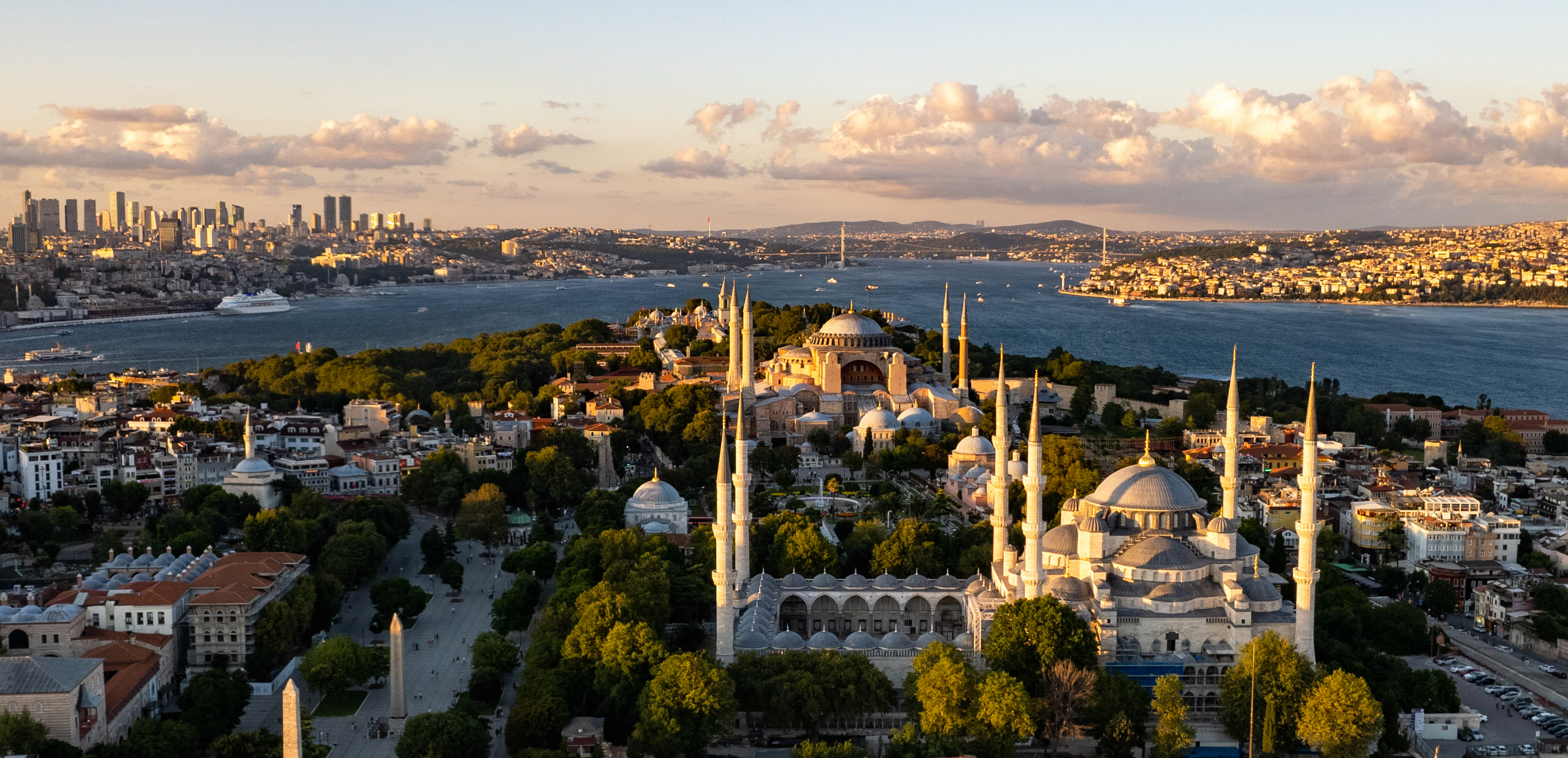
A view towards European part of Istanbul, which plays an important part for the Turkish economy

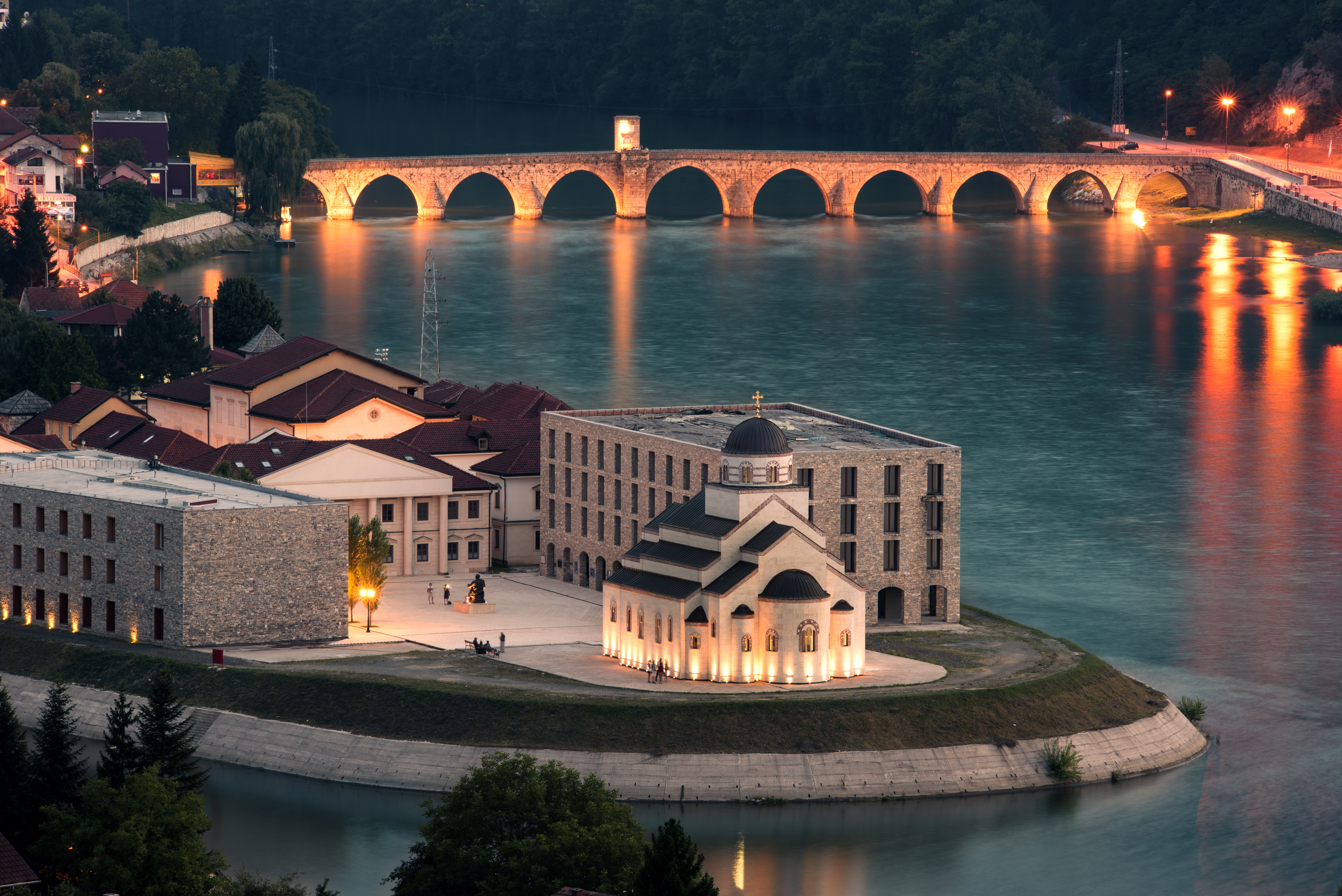
A view towards Andrićgrad and Mehmed Paša Sokolović Bridge in Bosnia and Herzegovina; tourism is a rapidly growing sector of the Bosnian economy

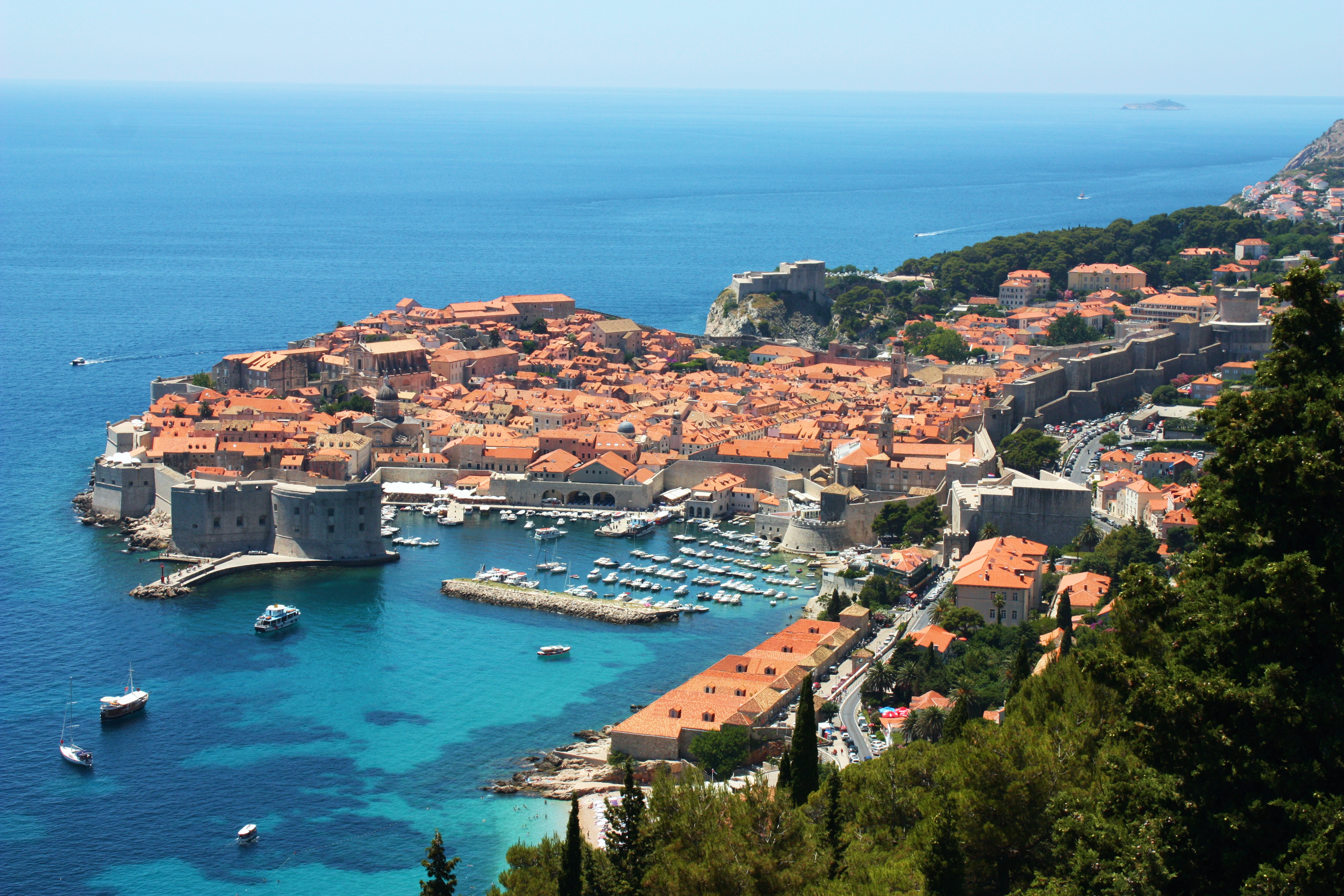
A view of Dubrovnik in Croatia; tourism contributes substantially to the Croatian economy

Currently, all of the states are republics, but until World War II all countries were monarchies. Most of the republics are parliamentary, excluding Romania and Bosnia which are semi-presidential. All the states have open market economies, most of which are in the upper-middle-income range ($4,000–12,000 p.c.), except Croatia, Romania, Greece, and Slovenia that have high income economies (over $12,000 p.c.), and are classified with very high HDI, along with Bulgaria, in contrast to the remaining states, which are classified with high HDI. The states from the former Eastern Bloc that formerly had planned economy system and Turkey mark gradual economic growth each year. The gross domestic product per capita is highest in Slovenia (over $29,000), followed by Croatia and Greece (~$20,000), Romania, Bulgaria (over $11,000), Turkey, Montenegro, Serbia (between $10,000 and $9,000), and Bosnia and Herzegovina, Albania, North Macedonia (~$7,000) and Kosovo ($5,000). The Gini coefficient, which indicates the level of difference by monetary welfare of the layers, is on the second level at the highest monetary equality in Albania, Bulgaria, and Serbia, on the third level in Greece, Montenegro and Romania, on the fourth level in North Macedonia, on the fifth level in Turkey, and the most unequal by Gini coefficient is Bosnia at the eighth level which is the penultimate level and one of the highest in the world. The unemployment is lowest in Romania and Bulgaria (around 5%), followed by Serbia and Albania (11–12%), Turkey, Greece, Bosnia, North Macedonia (13–16%), Montenegro (~18%), and Kosovo (~25%).

As nations in the Western Balkans opened up to private investment in the 1990s, newly created enterprises (mostly SMEs) fueled regional economic development by facilitating the transition from a massive state-owned structure to a market economy. SMEs now account for 99% of all active businesses, up to 81% of total value created, and 72% of total employment in the Western Balkans.

The Western Balkans are mostly bank-based economies, with bank credit serving as the primary source of external capital for all enterprises, including SMEs. Despite this, the region's bank credit supply is limited and undeveloped. A recent analysis from the European Investment Bank estimated the funding deficit to be at US$2.8 billion, or around 2.5% of nominal GDP.

In most Western Balkan markets, international banks have a market share of 70% to 90%. At the end of 2023, the macroeconomic environment in the Western Balkans indicates that risks are increasing, threatening to worsen the financial imbalance. Recent survey findings give conflicting data on enterprises' funding circumstances. While supply has fallen as a result of the COVID-19 pandemic and interest rate increasers, it has showed progressive recovery.

=== Regional organizations ===
Southeast European Cooperation Process (SEECP) member states

Southeast European Cooperative Initiative (SECI) members observers

Stability Pact for South Eastern Europe members observers supporting partners

Black Sea Economic Cooperation (BSEC) members observers

== Statistics ==
	Albania	Bosnia and Herzegovina	Bulgaria	Croatia	Greece	Kosovo	Montenegro	North Macedonia	Romania	Serbia	Slovenia	Turkey
Flag	(Albania)	(Bosnia and Herzegovina)	(Bulgaria)	(Croatia)	(Greece)	(Kosovo)	(Montenegro)	(North Macedonia)	(Romania)	(Serbia)	(Slovenia)	(Turkey)
Coat of arms	Albania	Bosnia and Herzegovina	Bulgaria	Croatia	Greece	Kosovo	Montenegro	North Macedonia	Romania	Serbia	Slovenia	
Capital	Tirana	Sarajevo	Sofia	Zagreb	Athens	Pristina	Podgorica	Skopje	Bucharest	Belgrade	Ljubljana	Ankara
Independence	28 November 1912	3 March 1992	5 October 1908	26 June 1991	25 March 1821	17 February 2008	3 June 2006	17 November 1991	9 May 1878	5 June, 2006	25 June, 1991	29 October, 1923
Head of state	Bajram Begaj	Željka Cvijanović; Darijana Filipović; Denis Bećirović	Iliana Iotova	Zoran Milanović	Konstantinos Tasoulas	Justina Pula	Jakov Milatović	Gordana Siljanovska-Davkova	Nicușor Dan	Aleksandar Čupić	Nataša Pirc Musar	Recep Tayyip Erdoğan
Head of government	Edi Rama	Borjana Krišto	Rumen Radev	Andrej Plenković	Kyriakos Mitsotakis	Albin Kurti	Milojko Spajić	Hristijan Mickoski	Ilie Bolojan	Đuro Macut	Janez Janša	Recep Tayyip Erdoğan
Population (2023)	▼2,761,785	▼3,502,550	▼6,447,710	▼3,850,894	▼10,394,055	▼1,798,188	▼616,695	▼1,829,954	▼19,051,562	▼6,664,449	▲2,116,792	▲85,279,553
Area	28,749 km^{2}	51,197 km^{2}	111,900 km^{2}	56,594 km^{2}	131,957 km^{2}	10,908 km^{2}	13,812 km^{2}	25,713 km^{2}	238,391 km^{2}	77,474 km^{2}	20,273 km^{2}	781,162 km^{2}
Density	96/km^{2}	68/km^{2}	58/km^{2}	68/km^{2}	79/km^{2}	159/km^{2}	45/km^{2}	71/km^{2}	80/km^{2}	85/km^{2}	102/km^{2}	101/km^{2}
Water area (%)	4.7%	0.02%	2.22%	1.1%	0.99%	1.00%	2.61%	1.09%	2.97%	0.13%	0.6%	1.3%
GDP (nominal, 2026)	▲$15.418 bln	▼$20.106 bln	▲$66.250 bln	▼$60.702 bln	▼$214.012 bln	▲$8.402 bln	▼$5.424 bln	▲$12.672 bln	▲$243.698 bln	▲$55.437 bln	▲$54.154 bln	▲$774.708 bln
GDP (PPP, 2026)	▲$38.305 bln	▲$47.590 bln	▲$162.186 bln	▲$107.362 bln	▲$312.267 bln	▲$20.912 bln	▲$11.940 bln	▲$32.638 bln	▲$516.359 bln	▲$122.740 bln	▲$75.967 bln	▲$2,300 bln
GDP per capita (nominal, 2026)	▲$12,493	▲$10,701	▲$23,848	▲$30,030	▲$29,696	▲$8,958	▲$16,377	▲$11,967	▲$25,693	▲$17,252	▲$40,630	▲$19,018
GDP per capita (PPP, 2026)	▲$25,247	▲$24,123	▲$45,642	▲$54,359	▲$47,175	▲$21,779	▲$36,333	▲$31,746	▲$50,783	▲$34,863	▲$60,644	▲$46,672
Gini Index (2018)	29.0 low (2012)	33.0 medium (2011)	▼39.6 medium	▼29.7 low	▼32.3 medium	▲29.0 low (2017)	▲36.7 medium (2017)	▼31.9 medium	▲35.1 medium	▼35.6 medium	▼23.4 low	▲43.0 medium
HDI (2023)	▲0.810 very high	▲0.804 very high	▲0.845 very high	▲0.889 very high	▲0.908 high	0.739 high (2016)	▲0.862 very high	▲0.815 very high	▲0.845 very high	▲0.833 very high	▲0.931 very high	▲0.853 very high
IHDI (2023)	▲0.705 high	▲0.689 medium	▲0.748 high	▲0.828 very high	▲0.825 very high	N/A	▲0.771 high	▲0.723 high	▲0.758 high	▲0.772 high	▲0.885 very high	▲0.708 high
Internet TLD	.al	.ba	.bg	.hr	.gr	Doesn't have	.me	.mk	.ro	.rs	.si	.tr
Calling code	+355	+387	+359	+385	+30	+383	+382	+389	+40	+381	+386	+90

== Demographics ==
The region is inhabited by Albanians, Aromanians, Bulgarians, Bosniaks, Croats, Gorani, Greeks, Istro-Romanians, Macedonians, Hungarians, Megleno-Romanians, Montenegrins, Serbs, Slovenes, Romanians, Turks, and other ethnic groups which present minorities in certain countries like the Romani and Ashkali.

State	Population (2023)	Density/km2 (2018)	Life expectancy (2018)
Albania	2,402,113	84	78.3 years
Bosnia and Herzegovina	3,502,550	69	77.2 years
Bulgaria	6,447,710	64	79.9 years
Croatia	3,850,894	73	78.2 years
Greece	10,394,055	82	80.1 years
Kosovo	1,585,566	145	77.7 years
Montenegro	623,633	45	76.4 years
North Macedonia	1,829,954	81	76.2 years
Romania	19,051,562	82	76.3 years
Serbia	6,664,449	90	76.5 years
Slovenia	2,116,792	102	80.3 years
Turkey	11,929,013^{[c]}	101	78.5 years

=== Religion ===
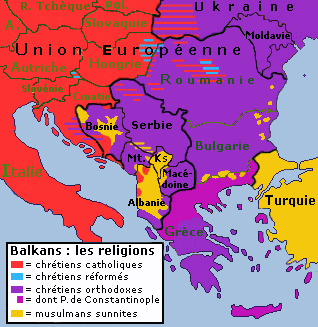
Map showing religious denominations

The region is a meeting point of Eastern Orthodoxy, Sunni Islam and Roman Catholicism. Eastern Orthodoxy is the majority religion in both the Balkan Peninsula and the Balkan region, The Eastern Orthodox Church has played a prominent role in the history and culture of Eastern and Southeastern Europe. A variety of different traditions of each faith are practiced, with each of the Eastern Orthodox countries having its own national church, except for Montenegro. A part of the population in the Balkans defines itself as irreligious.

Islam has a significant history in the region where Muslims make up a large percentage of the population. A 2013 estimate placed the total Muslim population of the Balkans at around eight million. Islam is the largest religion in nations like Albania, Bosnia-Herzegovina, and Kosovo with significant minorities in Bulgaria, North Macedonia and Montenegro. Smaller populations of Muslims are also found in Romania, Serbia and Greece.

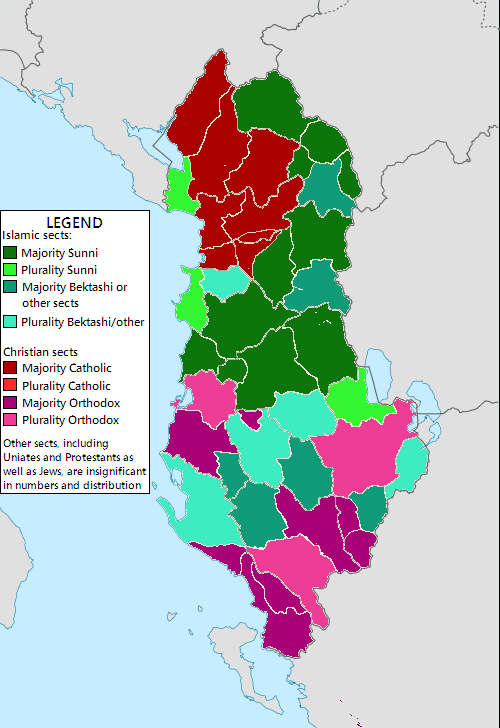
Approximate distribution of religions in Albania

Territories in which the principal religion is Eastern Orthodoxy (with national churches in parentheses)	Religious minorities of these territories
Bulgaria: 63% (Bulgarian Orthodox Church)	Islam (10%), Protestantism (1%), other and undeclared (26%)
Greece: 81–90% (Greek Orthodox Church)	Islam (2%), Catholicism, other and undeclared
Montenegro: 71% (Serbian Orthodox Church)	Islam (20%), Catholicism (3%), other and undeclared (6%)
North Macedonia: 64% (Macedonian Orthodox Church)	Islam (33%), Catholicism
Romania: 81% (Romanian Orthodox Church)	Protestantism (6%), Catholicism (5%), other and undeclared (8%)
Serbia: 81% (Serbian Orthodox Church)	Catholicism (4%), Islam (4%), Protestantism (1%), other and undeclared (8%)
Territories in which the principal religion is Catholicism	Religious minorities of these territories
Croatia (86%)	Eastern Orthodoxy (4%), Islam (1%), other and undeclared (7%)
Slovenia (57%)	Islam (2%), Orthodox (2%), other and undeclared (36%)
Territories in which the principal religion is Islam	Religious minorities of these territories
Albania (51%)	Catholicism (8%), Orthodoxy (7%), other and undeclared (34%)
Bosnia and Herzegovina (51%)	Orthodoxy (31%), Catholicism (15%), other and undeclared (4%)
Kosovo (95%)	Catholicism (2%), Orthodoxy (2%), other and undeclared (1%)
Turkey (90–99%)	Orthodoxy, Irreligious (5%–10%)

The Jewish communities of the Balkans were some of the oldest in Europe and date back to ancient times. These communities were Sephardi Jews, except in Croatia and Slovenia, where the Jewish communities were mainly Ashkenazi Jews. In Bosnia and Herzegovina, the small and close-knit Jewish community is 90% Sephardic, and Ladino is still spoken among the elderly. The Sephardi Jewish cemetery in Sarajevo has tombstones of a unique shape and inscribed in ancient Ladino. Sephardi Jews used to have a large presence in the city of Thessaloniki, and by 1900, some 80,000, or more than half of the population, were Jews. The Jewish communities in the Balkans suffered immensely during World War II, and the vast majority were killed during the Holocaust. An exception were the Bulgarian Jews who Boris III of Bulgaria sent to forced labor camps instead of Nazi concentration camps. Almost all of the few survivors have emigrated to the (then) newly founded state of Israel and elsewhere. Almost no Balkan country today has a significant Jewish minority.

=== Languages ===
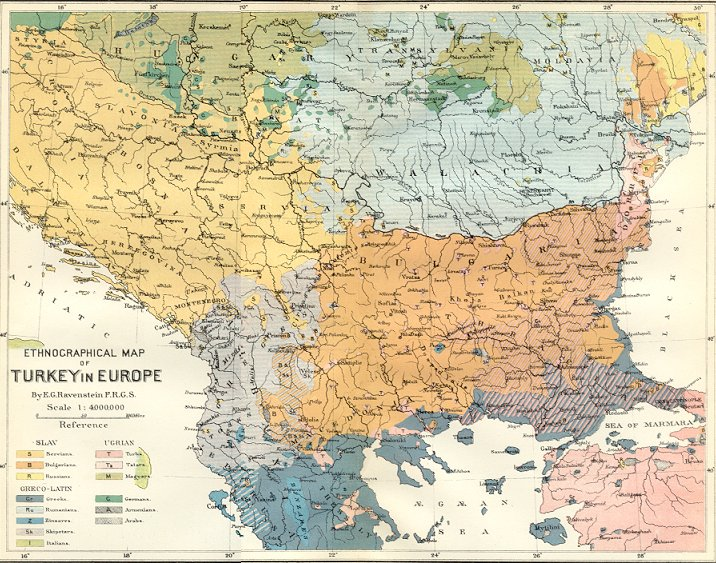
Ethnic map of the Balkans (1880)

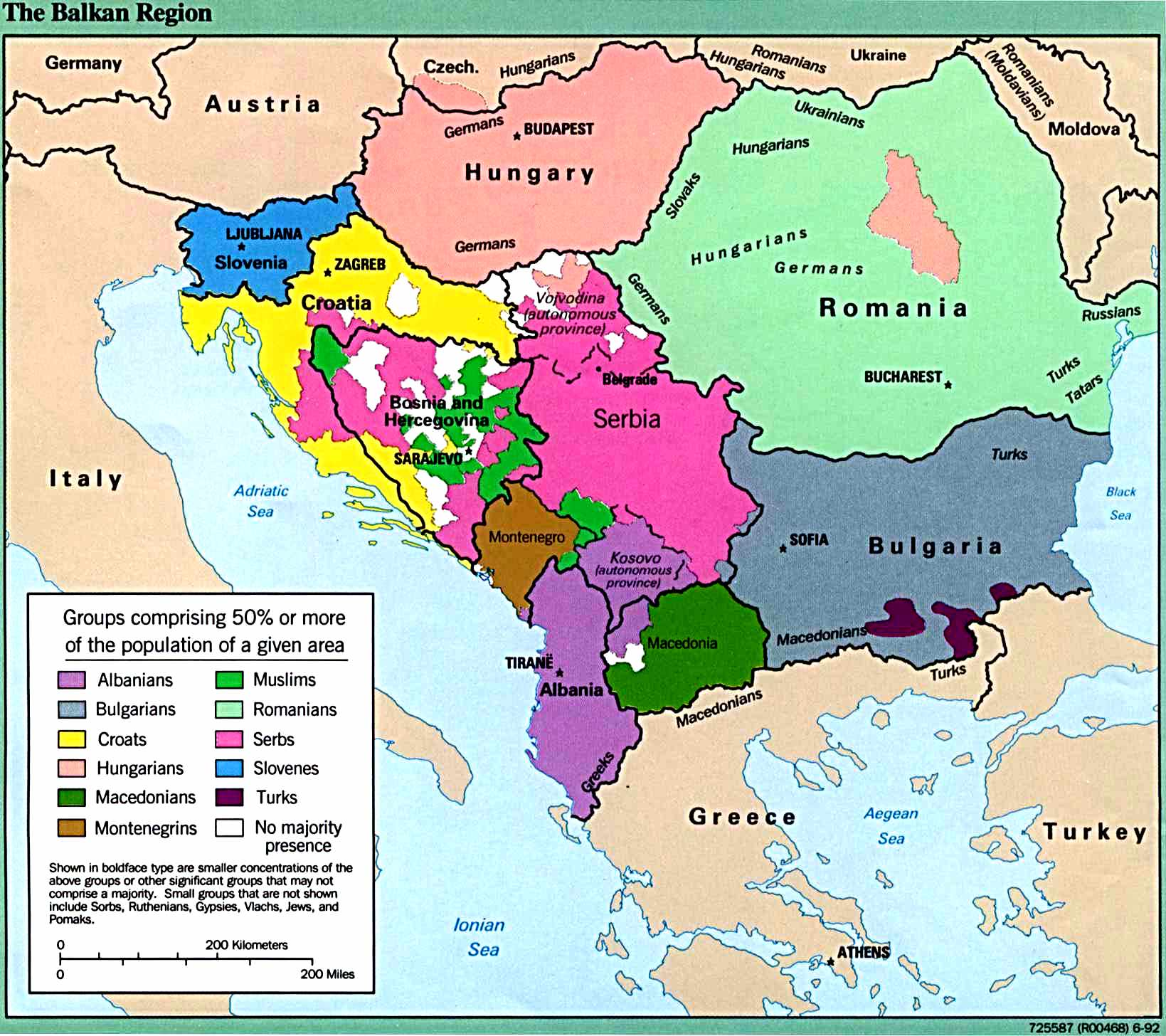
Ethnic map of the Balkans (1992)

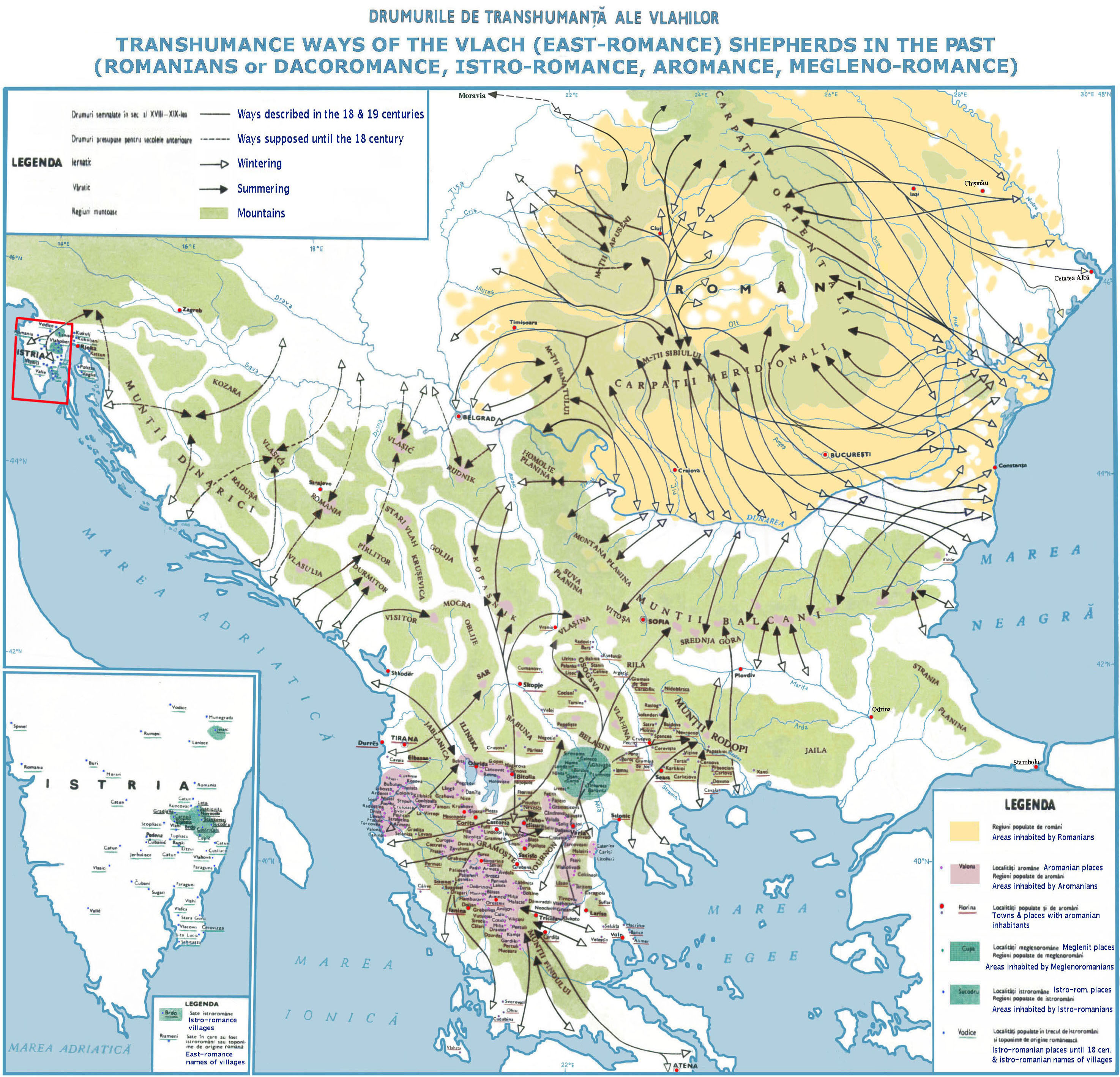
Transhumance ways of the Romance-speaking Vlach shepherds in the past

The Balkan region today is a very diverse ethnolinguistic region, being home to multiple Slavic and Romance languages, as well as Albanian, Greek, Turkish, Hungarian and others. Romani is spoken by a large portion of the Romanis living throughout the Balkan countries. Throughout history, many other ethnic groups with their own languages lived in the area, among them Thracians, Illyrians, Romans, Celts and various Germanic tribes. All of the aforementioned languages from the present and from the past belong to the wider Indo-European language family, with the exception of the Turkic languages (e.g., Turkish and Gagauz) and Hungarian.

State	Most spoken language	Linguistic minorities
Albania	98% Albanian	2% other
Bosnia and Herzegovina	53% Bosnian	31% Serbian (official), 15% Croatian (official), 2% other
Bulgaria	86% Bulgarian	8% Turkish, 4% Romani, 1% other, 1% unspecified
Croatia	96% Croatian	1% Serbian, 3% other
Greece	99% Greek	1% other
Kosovo	94% Albanian	2% Bosnian, 2% Serbian (official), 1% Turkish, 1% other
Montenegro	43% Serbian	37% Montenegrin (official), 5% Albanian, 5% Bosnian, 5% other, 4% unspecified
North Macedonia	67% Macedonian	25% Albanian (official), 4% Turkish, 2% Romani, 1% Serbian, 2% other
Romania	89% Romanian	6% Hungarian, 3% Romani
Serbia	88% Serbian	3% Hungarian, 2% Bosnian, 1% Romani, 3% other, 2% unspecified
Slovenia	91% Slovene	5% Serbo-Croatian, 4% other
Turkey	85% Turkish	12% Kurdish, 3% other and unspecified

=== Urbanization ===
Most of the states in the Balkans are predominantly urbanized, with the lowest number of urban population as % of the total population found in Bosnia and Herzegovina at 49%, Kosovo at 50% and Slovenia at 55%.

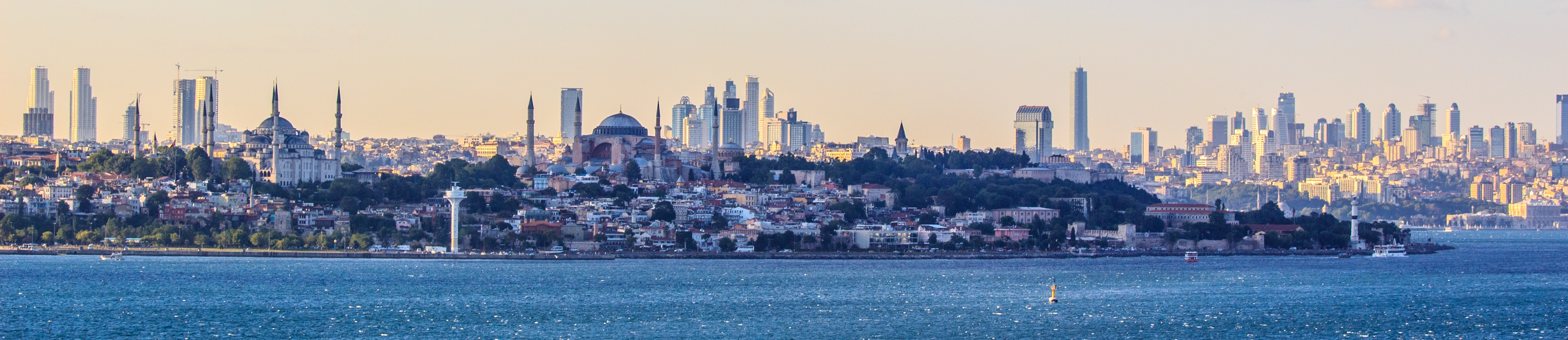
Panoramic view of Istanbul

A list of largest cities:

City	Country	Agglomeration	City proper	Year
Istanbul^{[b]}	Turkey	10,097,862	10,097,862	2019
Athens	Greece	3,753,783	664,046	2018
Bucharest	Romania	2,272,163	1,887,485	2018
Sofia	Bulgaria	1,995,950	1,313,595	2018
Belgrade	Serbia	1,659,440	1,119,696	2018
Zagreb	Croatia	1,217,150	767,131	2021
Thessaloniki	Greece	1,012,297	325,182	2018
Tirana	Albania	912,000	418,495	2018
Ljubljana	Slovenia	573,209	292,988	2018
Sarajevo	Bosnia and Herzegovina	555,210	275,524	2013
Skopje	North Macedonia	506,926	444,800	2018
Constanța	Romania	425,916	283,872	2018
Craiova	Romania	420,000	269,506	2018
Edirne	Turkey	413,903	306,464	2019
Cluj-Napoca	Romania	411,379	324,576	2018
Plovdiv	Bulgaria	396,092	411,567	2018
Varna	Bulgaria	383,075	395,949	2018
Iași	Romania	382,484	290,422	2018
Brașov	Romania	369,896	253,200	2018
Kırklareli	Turkey	361,836	259,302	2019
Timișoara	Romania	356,443	319,279	2018
Novi Sad	Serbia	341,625	277,522	2018
Tekirdağ	Turkey	215,558	186,421	2022
Split	Croatia	325,600	161,312	2021

^{b} Only the European part of Istanbul is a part of the Balkans. It is home to two-thirds of the city's 15,519,267 inhabitants.

== Time zones ==
The time zones in the Balkans are defined as the following:

- Territories in the time zone of UTC+01:00: Albania, Bosnia and Herzegovina, Croatia, Kosovo, Montenegro, North Macedonia, Serbia and Slovenia
- Territories in the time zone of UTC+02:00: Bulgaria, Greece, and Romania
- Territories in the time zone of UTC+03:00: Turkey

== Culture ==
- Cuisine of the Balkans
- Balkan music
- Balkan Athletics Championships
- Balkan Athletics Indoor Championships
- Imagining the Balkans

== See also ==
- Balkan Insight
- Balkan Universities Network
- Balkan Wars
  - First Balkan War
  - Second Balkan War

== Notes ==
b.	As The World Factbook cites, regarding Turkey and Southeastern Europe; "that portion of Turkey west of the Bosphorus is geographically part of Europe".

c.	The population only of European Turkey, that excludes the Anatolian Peninsula, which otherwise has a population of 75,627,384 and a density of 97.

d.	See:

e.	See:
