= William Baxter (scholar) =

William Baxter (1650–1723) was a Welsh scholar.

== Life ==
He was born at Lanhigan in Shropshire, son of a brother of Richard Baxter. When he went to Harrow School at the late age of eighteen, he could neither read nor understand one word of any language but Welsh. He soon, however, acquired much classical learning.

He carried on an extensive correspondence with all the prominent men of his generation. His profession was that of a schoolmaster, first in a boarding school at Tottenham High Cross (Middlesex), and later as master of the Mercers' School, London, where he remained for upwards of twenty years. He died 31 May 1723.

== Works ==
His first publication was an advanced Latin grammar, called De Analogia, sive arte Linguae Latinae Commentariolus ... in usum provectioris adolescentiae, 1679.

He made his most significant mark by his Anacreon, published in 1695, and which included two odes by Sappho. Later opinion pronounced it over-bold in its readings. It was reprinted in 1710, and Joshua Barnes charged Baxter with borrowing largely in the second edition from his own edition of Anacreon of 1705, but Barnes afterwards retracted the charge. In 1701 appeared Baxter's Horace, which J. M. Gesner made the basis of his edition, published in 1752 and also in 1772. Baxter's edition was republished in 1725 and in 1798. Robert Lowth pronounced it 'the best edition of Horace ever yet delivered to the world.' In 1788 Zeunius incorporated in an edition of Horace all Baxter's and Gesner's notes. Baxter's Horace includes abuse of Richard Bentley.

In 1719 he published his dictionary of British antiquities under the title of Glossarium Antiquitatum Britannicarum, sive Syllabus Etymologicus Antiquitatum Veteris Britanniae atque Iberniae temporibus Romanorum. This work was republished by Moses Williams. The same editor brought out Baxter's fragmentary posthumous work, his glossary of Roman antiquities, under the title of Reliquiae Baxterianae, sive W. Baxteri Opera Posthuma. It went only through the letter A. There is a life of the author written by himself accompanying it. He had prepared an edition of Juvenal with commentary and notes; but, in spite of Moses Williams's proposals, it never appeared.

Baxter from the outset pursued physiological studies and other subsidiary investigations, in the 'Philosophical Transactions' and Archaeologia. He was 'one of the hands' in the translation of Plutarch's Morals (1718).
