= Zeuner =

Zeuner is a surname. Notable people with the surname include:

- Brighton Zeuner (born 2004), American skateboarder
- Charles Zeuner (1795–1857), American organist and composer
- Frederick Everard Zeuner (1905–1963), German palaeontologist and geological archaeologist
- Gustav Zeuner (1828–1907), German physicist, engineer and epistemologist
- Jonas Zeuner (1727–1814), German artist and engraver
- Reg Zeuner (born 1928), Australian rules footballer
