= August Zeune =

German educator (1778–1853)

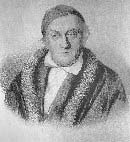
Johann August Zeune

Johann August Zeune (12 May 1778 – 14 November 1853) was a German academic, an authority on geography and Germanic languages, as well as the founder of the Berlin Blind School.

== Life ==
Zeune was born on 12 May 1778 in Wittenberg as the son of Johann Karl Zeune, professor of Greek at the University of Wittenberg. He was educated in his parents' house by his father and tutors. In 1798 he started studying at the University of Wittenberg. He graduated with his doctoral thesis on the history of geography, and was awarded for a short time the academic dignity of a docent, roughly the equivalent of a professorship in geography. His forward-thinking work the "Topological map" (Höhenschichten-Karte) of the earth, made him known in academic circles.

In 1803, he moved to Berlin and became a teacher at the Gymnasium zum Grauen Kloster. In Berlin, where he lived as a scholar, he was on friendly terms with Johann Gottlieb Fichte and the historian Johannes von Müller. He applied unsuccessfully for a place on an expedition into the interior of Africa, and shortly thereafter went into the "inner world of the blind". In the field of ophthalmology Zeune expanded his knowledge with the founder of the first European institution for the blind, Valentin Haüy in Paris. King Frederick William III decreed on 11 August 1806 the creation of a foundation for the blind in Berlin and Zeune was offered the appointment. On 13 October the same year he was able to start classes. Opened as the Königliche Blindenanstaltt and still operating as the Johann-August-Zeune-Schule für Blinde, it was the first blind school in Germany. During the hardships of the War of the Fourth Coalition (1806–07) he was only able to save the school by using up his own money, supported by gifts from friends.

In his geographical work, in 1809 he commissioned from the manufacturer Carl August Mencke the production in Mencke's imitation bronze (Holzbronze) of his relief globes, which were sold worldwide until 1818. From 1810 Zeune was a professor of geography in Berlin. From 1811 to 1821 he also lectured at the University of Berlin about German language and literature. His pedagogic skills were demonstrated in his manual of education of the blind, Belisarius (1808), and the work ''Goea. Versuch einer wissenschaftlichen Erdbeschreibung ("Gea. Attempt at a scientific geography"). In this work Zeune was the first to propose the name "Balkan Peninsula" (Balkanhalbinsel) to describe the region between the Black Sea and the Adriatic.

After the French occupation of the Napoleonic period, he became known as a political journalist of decidedly patriotic stance. As a Germanist, Zeune was under the influence of contemporary Romantic ideas. He fought against the usage of foreign words in the German language and worked on the publication of the Nibelungenlied, of which he published a prose translation (1813) and a paperback edition (1815).

Along with Johann Jacob Baeyer and others he was a co-founder in 1828 of the Berlin Geographical Society (Gesellschaft für Erdkunde zu Berlin).

Zeune died on 14 November 1853 in Berlin, after he had lost his eyesight in old age. He was buried at the Old St. George's Cemetery, 229/234 Greifswaldstrasse, Prenzlauer Berg, Berlin.

In his honor, the Johann-August-Zeune-Schule für Blinde or Zeune-Schule (Johann August Zeune School for the Blind) in Steglitz and the nearby Zeunepromenade were named after him.
