= Johann Karl Zeune =

German academic and philologist

Johann Karl Zeune (29 October 1736 – 8 November 1788) was a German academic and philologist.
