= Bismark/Kläden =

- Verwaltungsgemeinschaft
- Interactive map of Bismark/Kläden
- Location within Germany Location within Saxony-Anhalt
- Coordinates: 52°40′N 11°33′E
- Country: Germany
- State: Saxony-Anhalt
- District: Stendal
- Disbanded: 1 January 2010
- Subdivisions: 20 municipalities

Area
  - Total: 289.44 km^{2} (111.75 sq mi)

Population (2006)
  - Total: 9,877
  - Density: 34.12/km^{2} (88.38/sq mi)
- Time zone: UTC+01:00 (CET)
  - Summer (DST): UTC+02:00 (CEST)
- Vehicle registration: SDL
- Website: www.altmark.de/vgbk

Bismark/Kläden was a Verwaltungsgemeinschaft ("collective municipality") in the district of Stendal, in Saxony-Anhalt, Germany. The seat of the Verwaltungsgemeinschaft was in Kläden. It was disbanded on 1 January 2010.

== Subdivision ==
The Verwaltungsgemeinschaft Bismark/Kläden consisted of the following municipalities:

1. Badingen
2. Berkau
3. Bismark
4. Büste
5. Dobberkau
6. Garlipp
7. Grassau
8. Hohenwulsch
9. Holzhausen
10. Käthen
11. Kläden
12. Könnigde
13. Kremkau
14. Meßdorf
15. Querstedt
16. Schäplitz
17. Schernikau
18. Schinne
19. Schorstedt
20. Steinfeld
