= Steinfeld railway station =

Steinfeld railway station may refer to:

- Steinfeld (Oldb) station, Lower Saxony, Germany
- Steinfeld railway station, Steinfeld, Saxony-Anhalt, Germany

== See also ==
- Steinfeld (disambiguation)
