= Losse =

Losse may refer to:

== People ==
- Losse (surname)

== Places ==
- Losse, Saxony-Anhalt, a municipality in the district of Stendal, Germany
- Château de Losse, an historical site in the Périgord, Dordogne district of South-West of France
- Losse, Landes, a commune in Aquitaine, France
- Losse (Thouet), a principal tributary of the River Thouet
- Losse (river), runs through Kaufungen in Hesse, Germany
