= Grassau =

Grassau is the name of a number of places in Germany.

- Grassau, Bavaria
- Grassau, Brandenburg
- Grassau, Saxony-Anhalt
