= Wanzer =

- Ortsteil of Aland
- Interactive map of Wanzer
- Location within Germany Location within Saxony-Anhalt
- Coordinates: 53°0′N 11°37′E
- Country: Germany
- State: Saxony-Anhalt
- District: Stendal
- Municipality: Aland

Area
  - Total: 7.38 km^{2} (2.85 sq mi)
- Elevation: 16 m (52 ft)

Population (2006-12-31)
  - Total: 124
  - Density: 16.8/km^{2} (43.5/sq mi)
- Time zone: UTC+01:00 (CET)
  - Summer (DST): UTC+02:00 (CEST)
- Postal codes: 39615
- Dialling codes: 039395
- Vehicle registration: SDL
- Website: www.vgem-seehausen.de

Wanzer is a village and a former municipality in the district of Stendal, in Saxony-Anhalt, Germany. Since 1 January 2010, it is part of the municipality Aland.
