= Baben =

- Ortsteil of Eichstedt
- Interactive map of Baben
- Location within Germany Location within Saxony-Anhalt
- Coordinates: 52°42′0″N 11°53′24″E
- Country: Germany
- State: Saxony-Anhalt
- District: Stendal
- Municipality: Eichstedt

Area
  - Total: 9.06 km^{2} (3.50 sq mi)
- Elevation: 36 m (118 ft)

Population (2006-12-31)
  - Total: 190
  - Density: 21/km^{2} (54/sq mi)
- Time zone: UTC+01:00 (CET)
  - Summer (DST): UTC+02:00 (CEST)
- Postal codes: 39596
- Dialling codes: 039388
- Vehicle registration: SDL

Baben (German pronunciation: [ˈbaːbn̩]) is a village and a former municipality in the district of Stendal, in Saxony-Anhalt, Germany. Since 1 January 2010, it is part of the municipality Eichstedt.
