= Schönberg, Saxony-Anhalt =

Schönberg
- Stadtteil of Seehausen
- Interactive map of Schönberg
- Location within Germany Location within Saxony-Anhalt
- Coordinates: 52°52′N 11°49′E
- Country: Germany
- State: Saxony-Anhalt
- District: Stendal
- Town: Seehausen

Area
  - Total: 21.47 km^{2} (8.29 sq mi)
- Elevation: 21 m (69 ft)

Population (2009-12-31)
  - Total: 502
  - Density: 23.4/km^{2} (60.6/sq mi)
- Time zone: UTC+01:00 (CET)
  - Summer (DST): UTC+02:00 (CEST)
- Postal codes: 39615
- Dialling codes: 039386
- Vehicle registration: SDL
- Website: www.vgem-seehausen.de

Schönberg (German pronunciation: [ˈʃøːnbɛʁk]) is a village and a former municipality in the district of Stendal, in Saxony-Anhalt, Germany. Since 1 September 2010, it is part of the town Seehausen.
