= Wahrenberg =

- Ortsteil of Aland
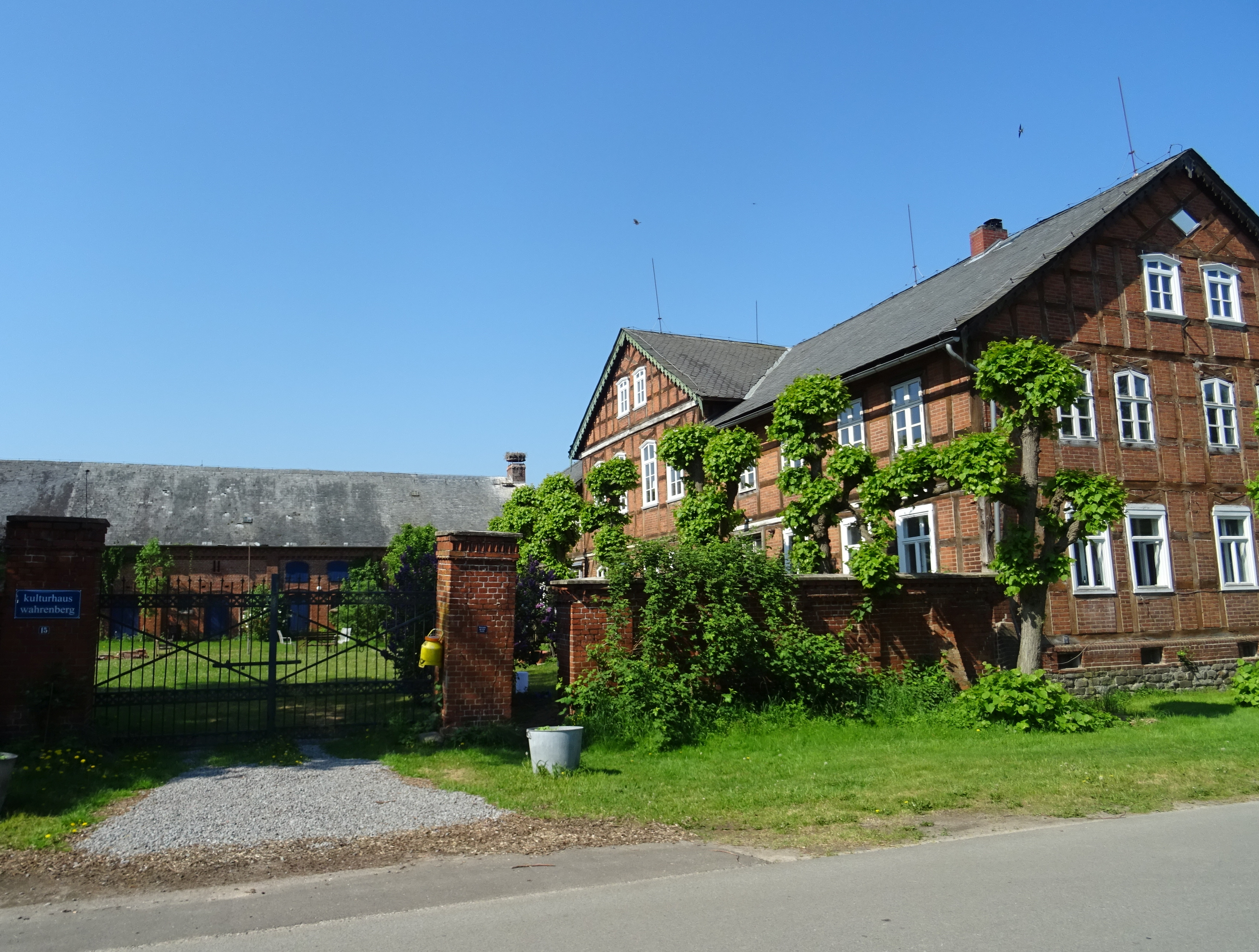
- A courtyard on the main street of Wahrenberg

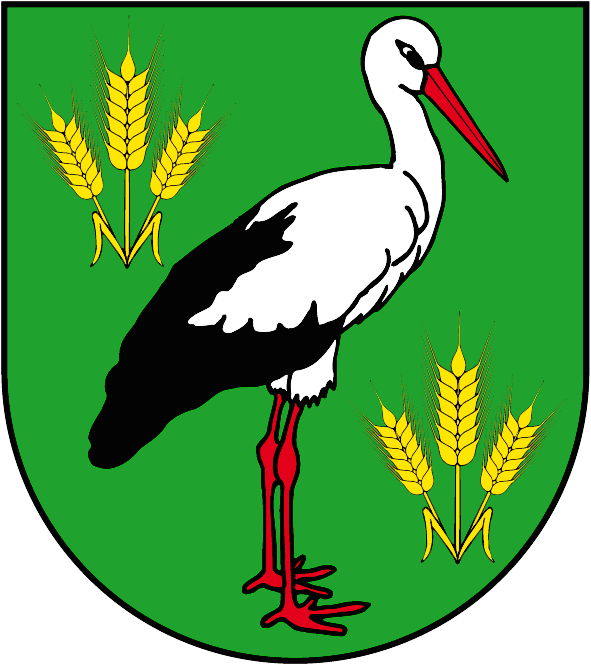
- Coat of arms
- Interactive map of Wahrenberg
- Location within Germany Location within Saxony-Anhalt
- Coordinates: 52°58′N 11°40′E
- Country: Germany
- State: Saxony-Anhalt
- District: Stendal
- Municipality: Aland

Area
  - Total: 18.23 km^{2} (7.04 sq mi)
- Elevation: 18 m (59 ft)

Population (2009-12-31)
  - Total: 341
  - Density: 18.7/km^{2} (48.4/sq mi)
- Time zone: UTC+01:00 (CET)
  - Summer (DST): UTC+02:00 (CEST)
- Postal codes: 39615
- Dialling codes: 039397
- Vehicle registration: SDL
- Website: www.vgem-seehausen.de

Wahrenberg is a village and a former municipality in the district of Stendal, in Saxony-Anhalt, Germany. Since 1 September 2010, it has been part of the municipality of Aland. Wahrenberg has an area of 18 km².
