= Losenrade =

- Stadtteil of Seehausen
- Interactive map of Losenrade
- Location within Germany Location within Saxony-Anhalt
- Coordinates: 52°58′N 11°46′E
- Country: Germany
- State: Saxony-Anhalt
- District: Stendal
- Town: Seehausen

Area
  - Total: 6.88 km^{2} (2.66 sq mi)
- Elevation: 19 m (62 ft)

Population (2015)
  - Total: 170
  - Density: 25/km^{2} (64/sq mi)
- Time zone: UTC+01:00 (CET)
  - Summer (DST): UTC+02:00 (CEST)
- Postal codes: 39615
- Dialling codes: 039397
- Vehicle registration: SDL

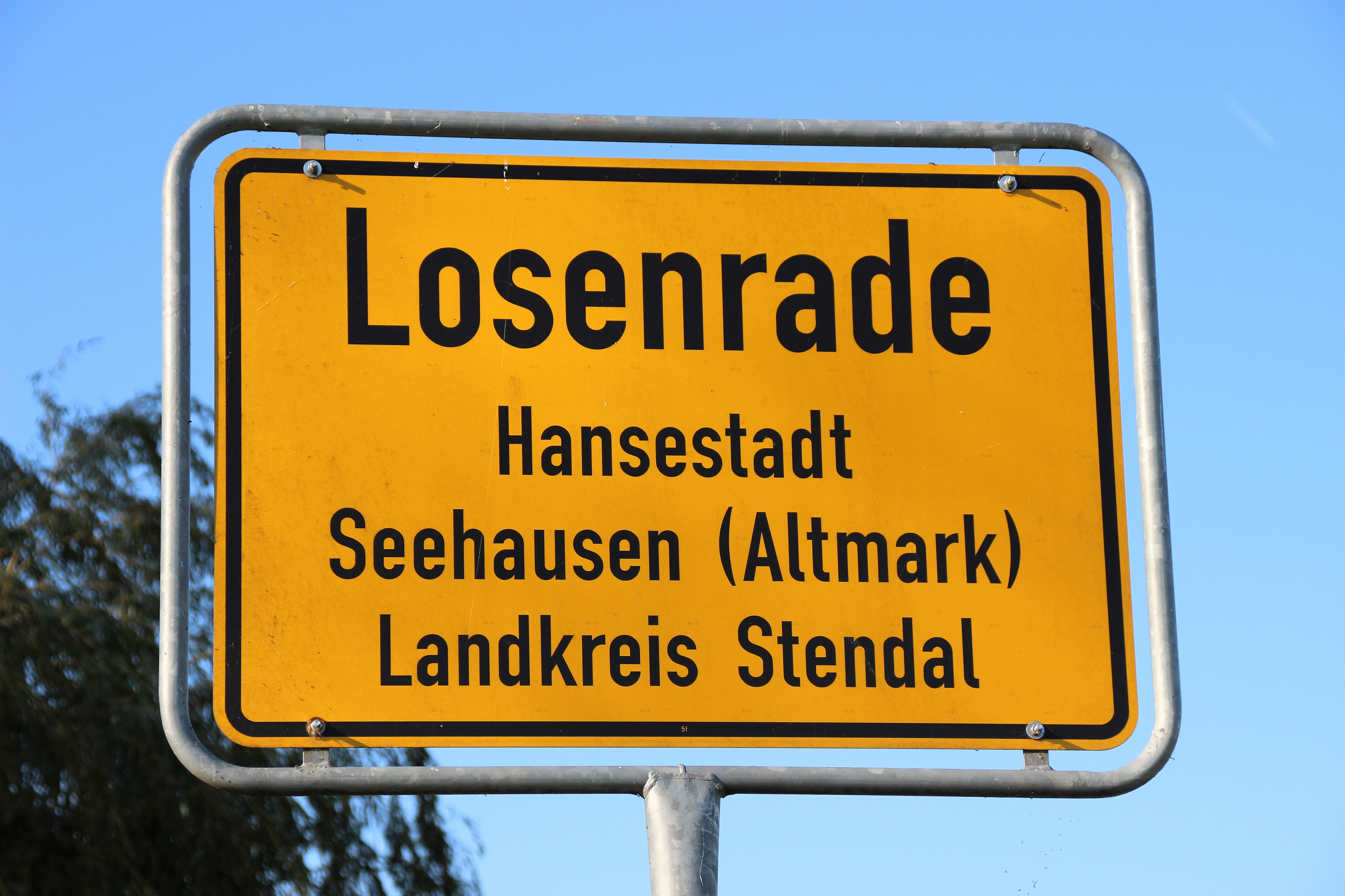
Place sign for Losenrade

Losenrade (German pronunciation: [loːzn̩ˈʁaːdə]) is a village and a former municipality in the district of Stendal, in Saxony-Anhalt, Germany. Since 1 January 2010, it is part of the town of Seehausen.
