= Lindtorf =

- Ortsteil of Eichstedt
- Coat of arms
- Interactive map of Lindtorf
- Location within Germany Location within Saxony-Anhalt
- Coordinates: 52°41′N 11°55′E
- Country: Germany
- State: Saxony-Anhalt
- District: Stendal
- Municipality: Eichstedt

Area
  - Total: 9.46 km^{2} (3.65 sq mi)
- Elevation: 33 m (108 ft)

Population (2006-12-31)
  - Total: 404
  - Density: 42.7/km^{2} (111/sq mi)
- Time zone: UTC+01:00 (CET)
  - Summer (DST): UTC+02:00 (CEST)
- Postal codes: 39596
- Dialling codes: 039388
- Website: www.arneburg-goldbeck.de

Lindtorf is a village and a former municipality in the district of Stendal, in Saxony-Anhalt, Germany. Since 1 January 2010, it is part of the municipality Eichstedt.
