= Geestgottberg station =

Railway station in Geestgottberg, Germany

Geestgottberg

General information
- Location: Geestgottberg, Saxony-Anhalt, Germany
- Coordinates: 52°57′19″N 11°44′13″E
- Line: Magdeburg-Wittenberge railway
- Platforms: 2
- Tracks: 2

Services
Preceding station	Mittelelbe S-Bahn	Following station
Seehausen (Altm) towards Schönebeck-Bad Salzelmen	S 1	Wittenberge Terminus
Location
- Location within Saxony-Anhalt Location within Germany Location within Europe

Geestgottberg (German: Bahnhof Geestgottberg) is a railway station in the town of Geestgottberg, Saxony-Anhalt, Germany. The station lies on the Magdeburg-Wittenberge railway and the train services are operated by Deutsche Bahn.

== Train services ==
The station is served by the following services:

- regional bahn RB 29 Wittenberge - Stendal - Magdeburg Hbf - Schönebeck (Elbe) - Schönebeck-Salzelmen
