= Klaeden =

Klaeden may refer to:

== Places ==
- Kläden, a village in Altmarkkreis Salzwedel, Germany
- Kläden (Bismark), a village in district Stendal, Germany

== People with the surname ==
- Eckart von Klaeden, politician (CDU), born 1965 in Hannover, Germany
- Sandra von Klaeden (née Kuban, born 1969), lawyer and politician (CDU)
- Klaeden (nobility), a line of Prussian nobility, also Kloeden or Klöden

== See also ==
- Kaleden, British Columbia, Canada
