= Krüden =

- Ortsteil of Aland
- Interactive map of Krüden
- Location within Germany Location within Saxony-Anhalt
- Coordinates: 52°55′N 11°41′E
- Country: Germany
- State: Saxony-Anhalt
- District: Stendal
- Municipality: Aland

Area
  - Total: 29.36 km^{2} (11.34 sq mi)
- Elevation: 20 m (66 ft)

Population (2006-12-31)
  - Total: 696
  - Density: 23.7/km^{2} (61.4/sq mi)
- Time zone: UTC+01:00 (CET)
  - Summer (DST): UTC+02:00 (CEST)
- Postal codes: 39615
- Dialling codes: 039386
- Vehicle registration: SDL
- Website: www.vgem-seehausen.de

Krüden is a village and a former municipality in the district of Stendal, in Saxony-Anhalt, Germany. Since 1 January 2010, it is part of the municipality Aland.

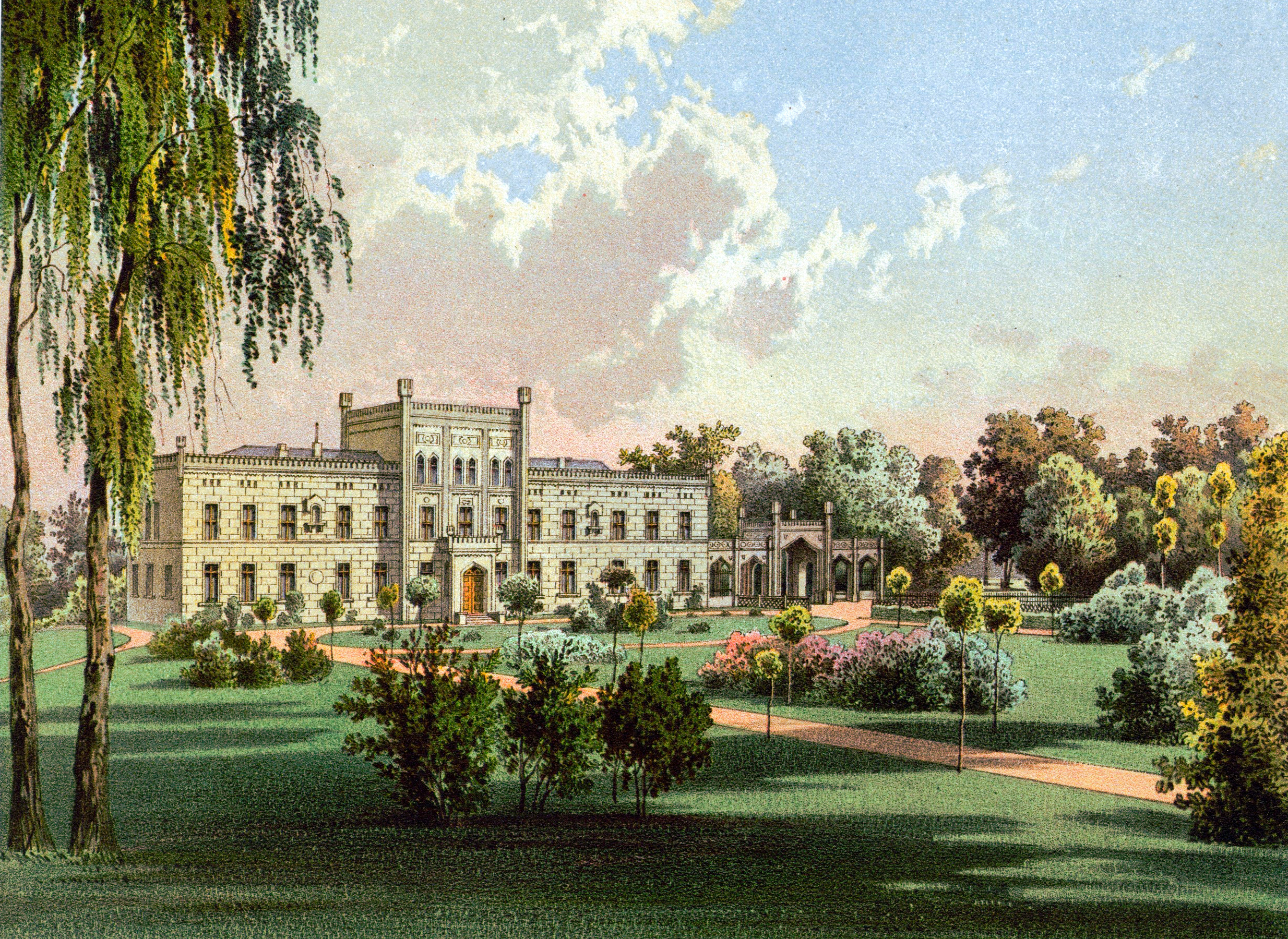
Palace Krüden, around 1860, Edition by Alexander Duncker
