= Gagel (surname) =

Gagel is a German habitational surname for a person from Gagel in the Altmark region of northern Saxony-Anhalt and may refer to:
