= Heiligenfelde =

- Ortsteil of Altmärkische Höhe
- Interactive map of Heiligenfelde
- Location within Germany Location within Saxony-Anhalt
- Coordinates: 52°49′N 11°30′E
- Country: Germany
- State: Saxony-Anhalt
- District: Stendal
- Municipality: Altmärkische Höhe

Area
  - Total: 10.66 km^{2} (4.12 sq mi)
- Elevation: 37 m (121 ft)

Population (2006-12-31)
  - Total: 231
  - Density: 21.7/km^{2} (56.1/sq mi)
- Time zone: UTC+01:00 (CET)
  - Summer (DST): UTC+02:00 (CEST)
- Postal codes: 39606
- Dialling codes: 039399
- Vehicle registration: SDL
- Website: www.vgem-seehausen.de

Heiligenfelde is a village and a former municipality in the district of Stendal, in Saxony-Anhalt, Germany. Since 1 January 2010, it is part of the municipality Altmärkische Höhe.
