= Beuster =

- Stadtteil of Seehausen
- Interactive map of Beuster
- Location within Germany Location within Saxony-Anhalt
- Coordinates: 52°55′N 11°46′E
- Country: Germany
- State: Saxony-Anhalt
- District: Stendal
- Town: Seehausen

Area
  - Total: 27.05 km^{2} (10.44 sq mi)
- Elevation: 18 m (59 ft)

Population (2006-12-31)
  - Total: 510
  - Density: 19/km^{2} (49/sq mi)
- Time zone: UTC+01:00 (CET)
  - Summer (DST): UTC+02:00 (CEST)
- Postal codes: 39615
- Dialling codes: 039397
- Vehicle registration: SDL

Beuster (German pronunciation: [ˈbɔʏstɐ]) is a village and a former municipality in the district of Stendal, in Saxony-Anhalt, in northern Germany. Since 1 January 2010, it is part of the town Seehausen.

== History ==
During the final stages of World War II, on 12 March 1945, Beuster was the site of a stopover during the German-organised march of French prisoners of war from the Oflag II-B camp to the Oflag VI-A camp.
