= Lückstedt =

- Ortsteil of Altmärkische Höhe
- Interactive map of Lückstedt
- Location within Germany Location within Saxony-Anhalt
- Coordinates: 52°49′N 11°34′E
- Country: Germany
- State: Saxony-Anhalt
- District: Stendal
- Municipality: Altmärkische Höhe

Area
  - Total: 13.38 km^{2} (5.17 sq mi)
- Elevation: 25 m (82 ft)

Population (2006-12-31)
  - Total: 579
  - Density: 43.3/km^{2} (112/sq mi)
- Time zone: UTC+01:00 (CET)
  - Summer (DST): UTC+02:00 (CEST)
- Postal codes: 39606
- Dialling codes: 039391
- Vehicle registration: SDL
- Website: www.vgem-seehausen.de

Lückstedt is a village and a former municipality in the district of Stendal, in Saxony-Anhalt, Germany. Since 1 January 2010, it is part of the municipality of Altmärkische Höhe.
