= Seehausen (Altm) station =

Railway station in Seehausen (Altmark), Germany

Seehausen (Altm)

General information
- Location: Seehausen, Saxony-Anhalt, Germany
- Coordinates: 52°53′08″N 11°44′36″E
- Line: Magdeburg-Wittenberge railway
- Platforms: 3
- Tracks: 3

Services
Preceding station	Mittelelbe S-Bahn	Following station
Osterburg towards Schönebeck-Bad Salzelmen	S 1	Geestgottberg towards Wittenberge
Location
- Location within Saxony-Anhalt

Seehausen (Altm) (German: Bahnhof Seehausen (Altm)) is a railway station in the town of Seehausen, Saxony-Anhalt, Germany. The station lies on the Magdeburg-Wittenberge railway and the train services are operated by Deutsche Bahn.

== Train services ==
The station is served by the following services:

- S 1 Wittenberge - Stendal - Magdeburg Hbf - Schönebeck (Elbe) - Schönebeck-Salzelmen
