= Schäplitz =

- Stadtteil of Bismark
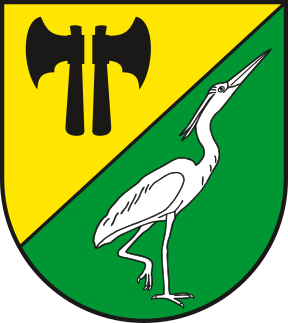
- Coat of arms
- Interactive map of Schäplitz
- Location within Germany Location within Saxony-Anhalt
- Coordinates: 52°37′48″N 11°37′0″E
- Country: Germany
- State: Saxony-Anhalt
- District: Stendal
- Town: Bismark

Area
  - Total: 7.15 km^{2} (2.76 sq mi)
- Elevation: 37 m (121 ft)

Population (2006-12-31)
  - Total: 109
  - Density: 15.2/km^{2} (39.5/sq mi)
- Time zone: UTC+01:00 (CET)
  - Summer (DST): UTC+02:00 (CEST)
- Postal codes: 39579
- Dialling codes: 039324
- Vehicle registration: SDL

Schäplitz is a village and a former municipality in the district of Stendal, in Saxony-Anhalt, Germany.

Since 1 January 2010, it is part of the town Bismark.
