= Losse, Saxony-Anhalt =

Losse
- Ortsteil of Altmärkische Höhe
- Interactive map of Losse
- Location within Germany Location within Saxony-Anhalt
- Coordinates: 52°52′N 11°40′E
- Country: Germany
- State: Saxony-Anhalt
- District: Stendal
- Municipality: Altmärkische Höhe

Area
  - Total: 8.90 km^{2} (3.44 sq mi)
- Elevation: 30 m (98 ft)

Population (2006-12-31)
  - Total: 124
  - Density: 13.9/km^{2} (36.1/sq mi)
- Time zone: UTC+01:00 (CET)
  - Summer (DST): UTC+02:00 (CEST)
- Postal codes: 39615
- Dialling codes: 039386
- Vehicle registration: SDL
- Website: www.vgem-seehausen.de

Losse (German pronunciation: [ˈlɔsə]) is a village and a former municipality in the district of Stendal, in Saxony-Anhalt, Germany. Since 1 January 2010, it is part of the municipality Altmärkische Höhe.
