= Badingen =

- Stadtteil of Bismark
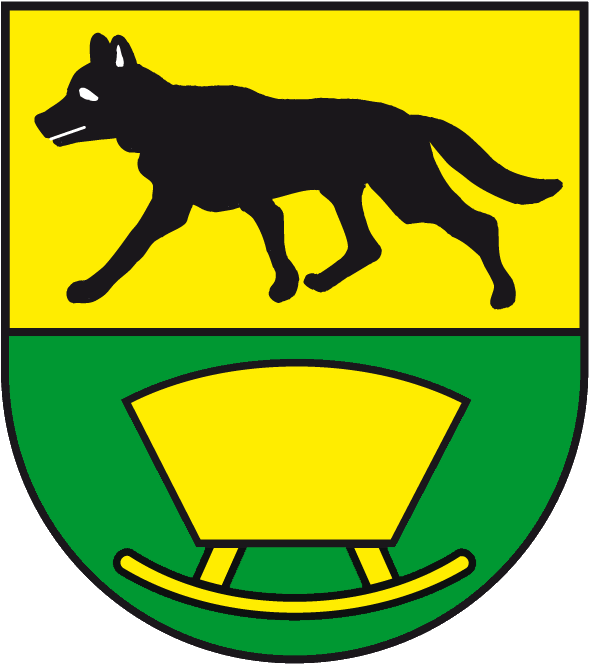
- Coat of arms
- Interactive map of Badingen
- Location within Germany Location within Saxony-Anhalt
- Coordinates: 52°36′47″N 11°39′0″E
- Country: Germany
- State: Saxony-Anhalt
- District: Stendal
- Town: Bismark

Area
  - Total: 17.35 km^{2} (6.70 sq mi)
- Elevation: 34 m (112 ft)

Population (2006-12-31)
  - Total: 515
  - Density: 29.7/km^{2} (76.9/sq mi)
- Time zone: UTC+01:00 (CET)
  - Summer (DST): UTC+02:00 (CEST)
- Postal codes: 39579
- Dialling codes: 039324
- Vehicle registration: SDL

Badingen is a village and a former municipality in the district of Stendal, in Saxony-Anhalt, Germany. Since 1 January 2010, it is part of the town Bismark. Badingen observes Central European Time.

== History ==
Badingen first appeared in 980 in a document as Waddigo.

On 30 September 1928, the Gutsbezirk Badingen was united with the rural community Badingen.
