= Schorstedt =

- Stadtteil of Bismark
- Interactive map of Schorstedt
- Location within Germany Location within Saxony-Anhalt
- Coordinates: 52°43′N 11°39′E
- Country: Germany
- State: Saxony-Anhalt
- District: Stendal
- Town: Bismark

Area
  - Total: 15.00 km^{2} (5.79 sq mi)
- Elevation: 39 m (128 ft)

Population (2006-12-31)
  - Total: 297
  - Density: 19.8/km^{2} (51.3/sq mi)
- Time zone: UTC+01:00 (CET)
  - Summer (DST): UTC+02:00 (CEST)
- Postal codes: 39606
- Dialling codes: 039328
- Website: stadt-bismark.de/schorstedt

Schorstedt is a village and a former municipality in the district of Stendal, in Saxony-Anhalt, Germany.

Since 1 January 2010, it is part of the town Bismark.
