= Querstedt =

- Stadtteil of Bismark
- Interactive map of Querstedt
- Location within Germany Location within Saxony-Anhalt
- Coordinates: 52°36′N 11°40′E
- Country: Germany
- State: Saxony-Anhalt
- District: Stendal
- Town: Bismark

Area
  - Total: 18.19 km^{2} (7.02 sq mi)
- Elevation: 39 m (128 ft)

Population (2006-12-31)
  - Total: 234
  - Density: 12.9/km^{2} (33.3/sq mi)
- Time zone: UTC+01:00 (CET)
  - Summer (DST): UTC+02:00 (CEST)
- Postal codes: 39579
- Dialling codes: 039324

Querstedt is a village and a former municipality in the district of Stendal, in Saxony-Anhalt, Germany.

Since 1 January 2010, it is part of the town Bismark.
