= Seehausen (Verbandsgemeinde) =

Municipality in Saxony-Anhalt, Germany

Seehausen (Altmark)
- Verbandsgemeinde
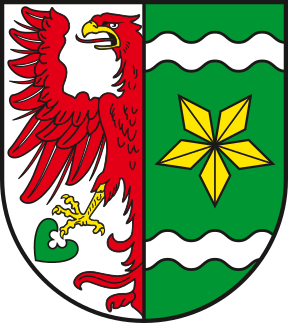
- Coat of arms

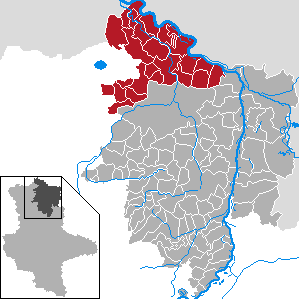
- Map of Stendal highlighting Seehausen (Altmark)
- Interactive map of Seehausen (Altmark)
- Location within Germany Location within Saxony-Anhalt
- Coordinates: 52°53′N 11°45′E
- Country: Germany
- State: Saxony-Anhalt
- District: Stendal
- Seat: Seehausen
- Subdivisions: 5 municipalities

Area
  - Total: 437.72 km^{2} (169.00 sq mi)

Population (2025-12-31)
  - Total: 9,091
  - Density: 20.77/km^{2} (53.79/sq mi)
- Time zone: UTC+01:00 (CET)
  - Summer (DST): UTC+02:00 (CEST)
- Website: www.seehausen-altmark.de

Seehausen (Altmark) is a Verbandsgemeinde ("collective municipality") in the district of Stendal, in Saxony-Anhalt, Germany. Before 1 January 2010, it was a Verwaltungsgemeinschaft. The seat of the Verbandsgemeinde is in Seehausen.

The Verbandsgemeinde Seehausen (Altmark) consists of the following municipalities:

1. Aland
2. Altmärkische Höhe
3. Altmärkische Wische
4. Seehausen
5. Zehrental
