= Könnigde =

- Stadtteil of Bismark
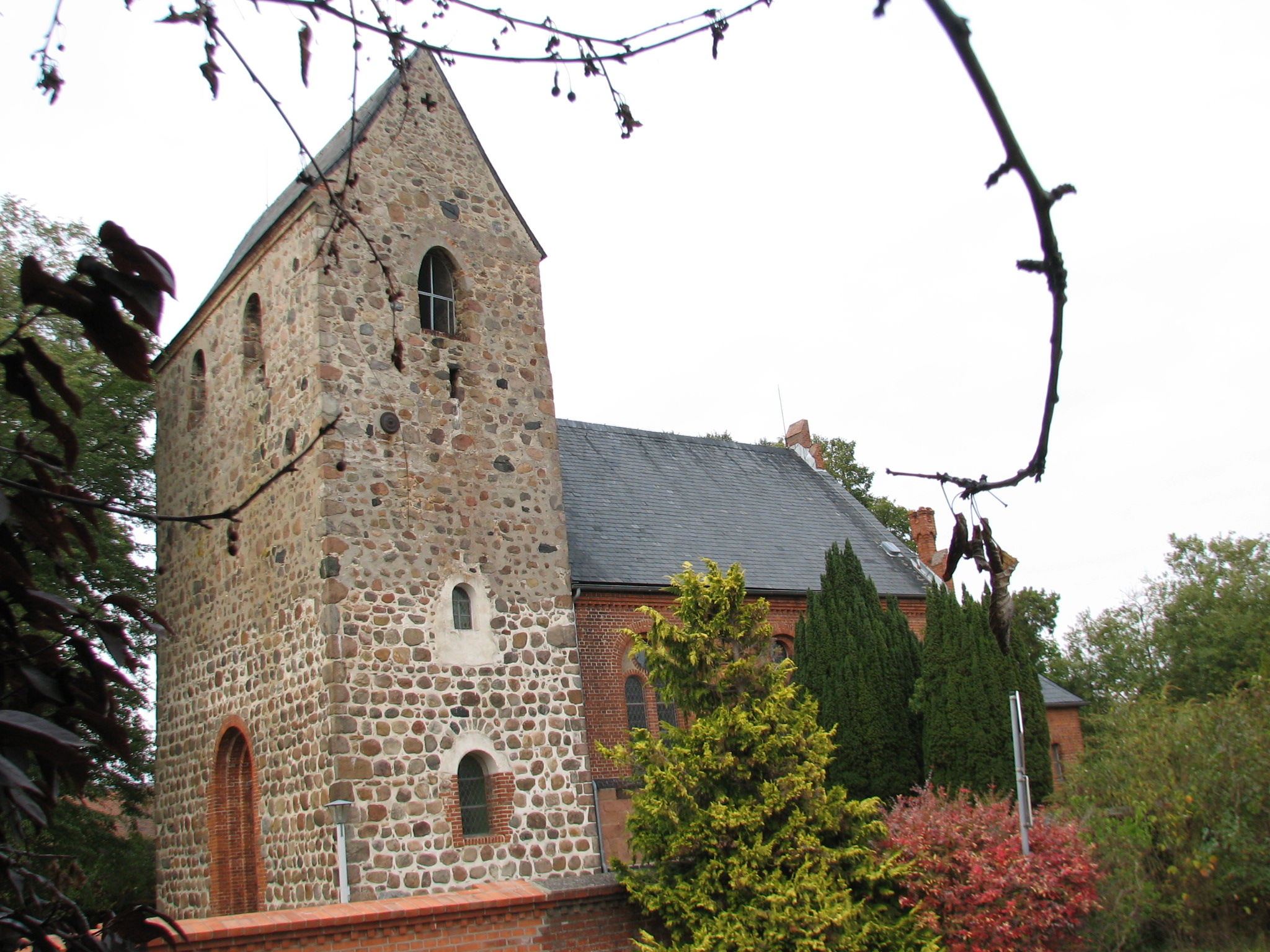
- A church in Könnigde

- Coat of arms
- Interactive map of Könnigde
- Location within Germany Location within Saxony-Anhalt
- Coordinates: 52°38′N 11°34′E
- Country: Germany
- State: Saxony-Anhalt
- District: Stendal
- Town: Bismark

Area
  - Total: 6.59 km^{2} (2.54 sq mi)
- Elevation: 38 m (125 ft)

Population (2006-12-31)
  - Total: 164
  - Density: 24.9/km^{2} (64.5/sq mi)
- Time zone: UTC+01:00 (CET)
  - Summer (DST): UTC+02:00 (CEST)
- Postal codes: 39629
- Dialling codes: 039089
- Vehicle registration: SDL

Könnigde is a village and a former municipality in the district of Stendal, in Saxony-Anhalt, Germany.

Since 1 January 2010, it is part of the town Bismark.
