= Hohenwulsch =

- Stadtteil of Bismark
- Interactive map of Hohenwulsch
- Location within Germany Location within Saxony-Anhalt
- Coordinates: 52°40′0″N 11°35′48″E
- Country: Germany
- State: Saxony-Anhalt
- District: Stendal
- Town: Bismark

Area
  - Total: 15.17 km^{2} (5.86 sq mi)
- Elevation: 47 m (154 ft)

Population (2006-12-31)
  - Total: 416
  - Density: 27.4/km^{2} (71.0/sq mi)
- Time zone: UTC+01:00 (CET)
  - Summer (DST): UTC+02:00 (CEST)
- Postal codes: 39606
- Dialling codes: 039089
- Vehicle registration: SDL

Hohenwulsch is a village and a former municipality in the district of Stendal, in Saxony-Anhalt, Germany.

Since 1 January 2010, it has been part of the town of Bismark.
