= Kremkau =

- Stadtteil of Bismark
- Interactive map of Kremkau
- Location within Germany Location within Saxony-Anhalt
- Coordinates: 52°37′59″N 11°26′35″E
- Country: Germany
- State: Saxony-Anhalt
- District: Stendal
- Town: Bismark

Area
  - Total: 9.90 km^{2} (3.82 sq mi)
- Elevation: 45 m (148 ft)

Population (2006-12-31)
  - Total: 217
  - Density: 21.9/km^{2} (56.8/sq mi)
- Time zone: UTC+01:00 (CET)
  - Summer (DST): UTC+02:00 (CEST)
- Postal codes: 39624
- Dialling codes: 039080
- Vehicle registration: SDL

Kremkau is a village and a former municipality in the district of Stendal, in Saxony-Anhalt, Germany.

Since 1 January 2010, it is part of the town Bismark.
