= Schinne =

- Stadtteil of Bismark
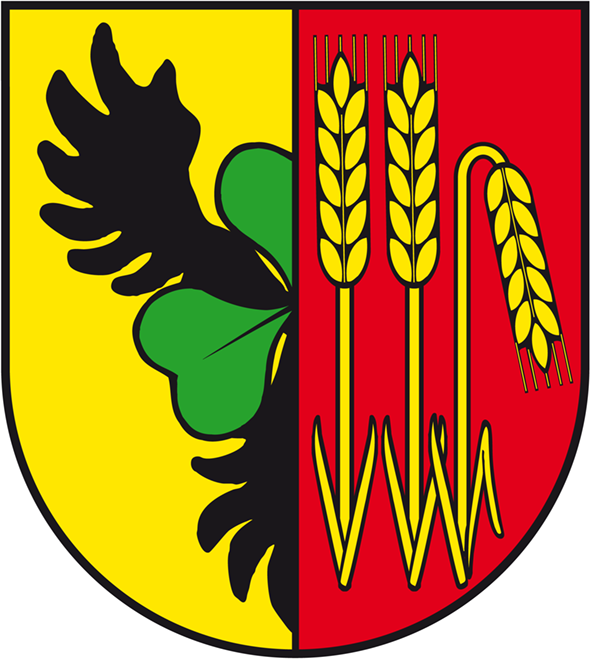
- Coat of arms
- Interactive map of Schinne
- Location within Germany Location within Saxony-Anhalt
- Coordinates: 52°40′N 11°44′E
- Country: Germany
- State: Saxony-Anhalt
- District: Stendal
- Town: Bismark

Area
  - Total: 15.11 km^{2} (5.83 sq mi)
- Elevation: 36 m (118 ft)

Population (2009-12-31)
  - Total: 451
  - Density: 29.8/km^{2} (77.3/sq mi)
- Time zone: UTC+01:00 (CET)
  - Summer (DST): UTC+02:00 (CEST)
- Postal codes: 39579
- Dialling codes: 039320
- Vehicle registration: SDL

Schinne is a village and a former municipality in the district of Stendal, in Saxony-Anhalt, Germany. Since 1 September 2010, it is part of the town Bismark.
