= Käthen =

- Stadtteil of Bismark
- Interactive map of Käthen
- Location within Germany Location within Saxony-Anhalt
- Coordinates: 52°34′36″N 11°40′0″E
- Country: Germany
- State: Saxony-Anhalt
- District: Stendal
- Town: Bismark

Area
  - Total: 8.03 km^{2} (3.10 sq mi)
- Elevation: 52 m (171 ft)

Population (2006-12-31)
  - Total: 143
  - Density: 17.8/km^{2} (46.1/sq mi)
- Time zone: UTC+01:00 (CET)
  - Summer (DST): UTC+02:00 (CEST)
- Postal codes: 39599
- Dialling codes: 039325
- Vehicle registration: SDL

Käthen is a village and a former municipality in the district of Stendal, in Saxony-Anhalt, Germany.

Since 1 January 2010, it is part of the town Bismark.
