= Geestgottberg =

- Stadtteil of Seehausen
- Interactive map of Geestgottberg
- Location within Germany Location within Saxony-Anhalt
- Coordinates: 52°57′N 11°43′E
- Country: Germany
- State: Saxony-Anhalt
- District: Stendal
- Town: Seehausen

Area
  - Total: 17.14 km^{2} (6.62 sq mi)
- Elevation: 19 m (62 ft)

Population (2006-12-31)
  - Total: 395
  - Density: 23.0/km^{2} (59.7/sq mi)
- Time zone: UTC+01:00 (CET)
  - Summer (DST): UTC+02:00 (CEST)
- Postal codes: 39615
- Dialling codes: 039397
- Vehicle registration: SDL

Geestgottberg (German pronunciation: [ˈɡeːstˌɡɔtbɛʁk]) is a village and a former municipality in the district of Stendal, in Saxony-Anhalt, Germany. Since 1 January 2010, it is part of the town Seehausen.
