= Gagel =

- Ortsteil of Altmärkische Höhe
- Interactive map of Gagel
- Location within Germany Location within Saxony-Anhalt
- Coordinates: 52°51′N 11°34′E
- Country: Germany
- State: Saxony-Anhalt
- District: Stendal
- Municipality: Altmärkische Höhe

Area
  - Total: 7.33 km^{2} (2.83 sq mi)
- Elevation: 34 m (112 ft)

Population (2006-12-31)
  - Total: 125
  - Density: 17.1/km^{2} (44.2/sq mi)
- Time zone: UTC+01:00 (CET)
  - Summer (DST): UTC+02:00 (CEST)
- Postal codes: 39606
- Dialling codes: 039391
- Vehicle registration: SDL
- Website: www.vgem-seehausen.de

Gagel is a village and a former municipality in the district of Stendal, in Saxony-Anhalt, Germany. Since 1 January 2010, it is part of the municipality Altmärkische Höhe.
