= Meßdorf =

- Stadtteil of Bismark
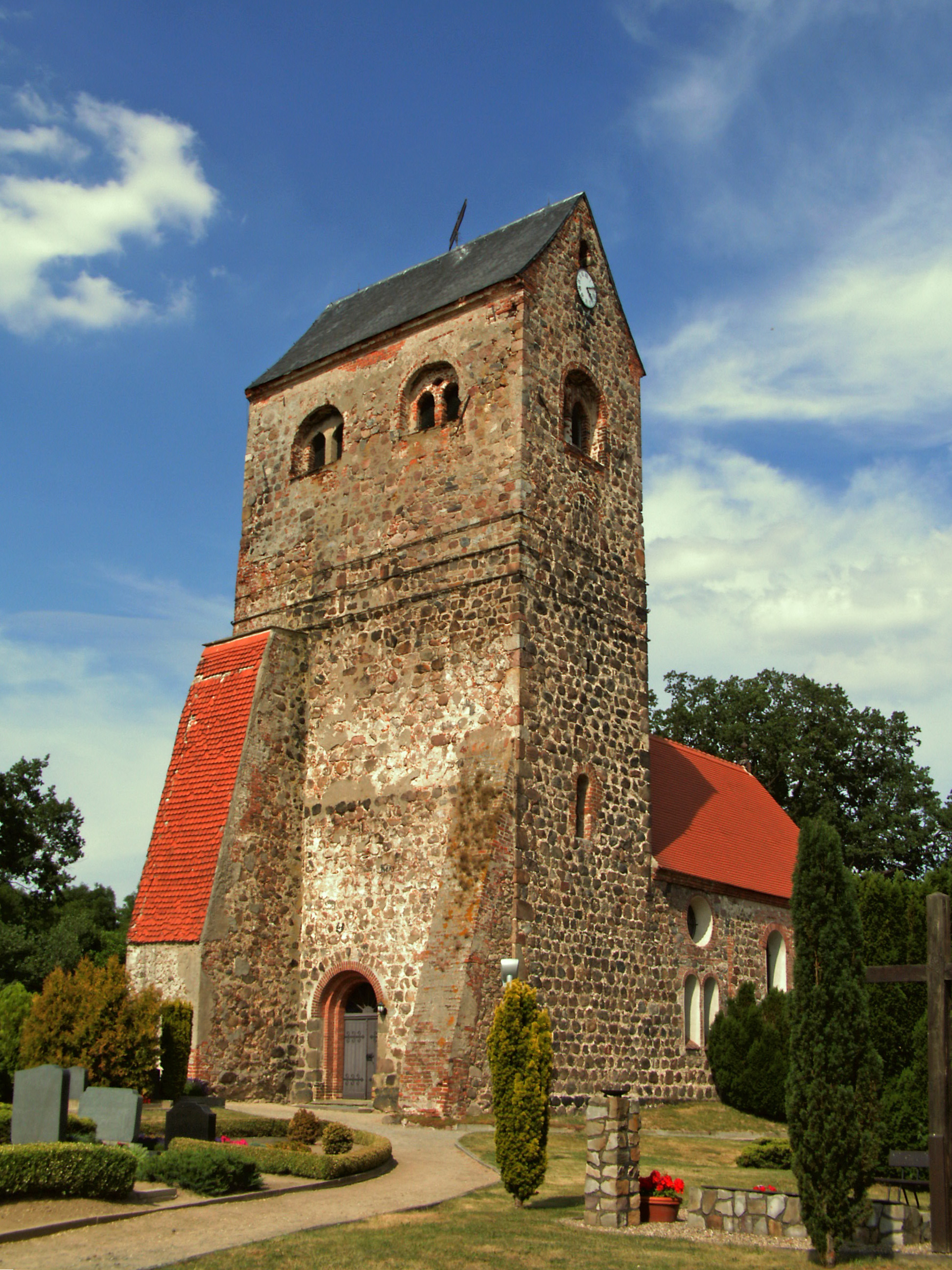
- Lutheran church

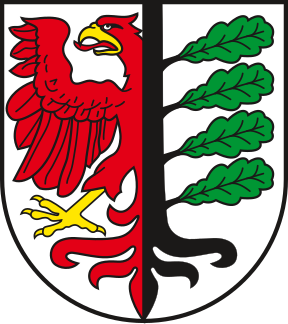
- Coat of arms
- Interactive map of Meßdorf
- Location within Germany Location within Saxony-Anhalt
- Coordinates: 52°43′0″N 11°33′47″E
- Country: Germany
- State: Saxony-Anhalt
- District: Stendal
- Town: Bismark

Area
  - Total: 27.89 km^{2} (10.77 sq mi)
- Elevation: 48 m (157 ft)

Population (2006-12-31)
  - Total: 720
  - Density: 26/km^{2} (67/sq mi)
- Time zone: UTC+01:00 (CET)
  - Summer (DST): UTC+02:00 (CEST)
- Postal codes: 39624
- Dialling codes: 039083
- Vehicle registration: SDL

Meßdorf is a village and a former municipality in the district of Stendal, in Saxony-Anhalt, Germany.

Since 1 January 2010, it is part of the town Bismark.
