= Büste =

- Stadtteil of Bismark
- Interactive map of Büste
- Location within Germany Location within Saxony-Anhalt
- Coordinates: 52°41′12″N 11°33′0″E
- Country: Germany
- State: Saxony-Anhalt
- District: Stendal
- Town: Bismark

Area
  - Total: 11.89 km^{2} (4.59 sq mi)
- Elevation: 41 m (135 ft)

Population (2006-12-31)
  - Total: 369
  - Density: 31.0/km^{2} (80.4/sq mi)
- Time zone: UTC+01:00 (CET)
  - Summer (DST): UTC+02:00 (CEST)
- Postal codes: 39624
- Dialling codes: 039089
- Vehicle registration: SDL
- Website: www.altmark.de/vgbk

Büste is a village and a former municipality in the district of Stendal, in Saxony-Anhalt, Germany.

It has been a part of the town Bismark since 1 January 2010.
