= Dobberkau =

- Stadtteil of Bismark
- Interactive map of Dobberkau
- Location within Germany Location within Saxony-Anhalt
- Coordinates: 52°42′N 11°36′E
- Country: Germany
- State: Saxony-Anhalt
- District: Stendal
- Town: Bismark

Area
  - Total: 16.44 km^{2} (6.35 sq mi)
- Elevation: 46 m (151 ft)

Population (2006-12-31)
  - Total: 309
  - Density: 18.8/km^{2} (48.7/sq mi)
- Time zone: UTC+01:00 (CET)
  - Summer (DST): UTC+02:00 (CEST)
- Postal codes: 39606
- Dialling codes: 039089

Dobberkau is a village and former municipality in the district of Stendal, in Saxony-Anhalt, Germany.

Since 1 January 2010, it has belonged to the town of Bismark.
