= Aland, Saxony-Anhalt =

Aland
- Municipality
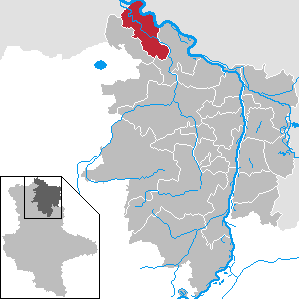
- Location of Aland within Stendal district
- Interactive map of Aland
- Location within Germany Location within Saxony-Anhalt
- Coordinates: 52°57′N 11°39′E
- Country: Germany
- State: Saxony-Anhalt
- District: Stendal
- Municipal assoc.: Seehausen

Government
  - Mayor (2023–30): Kevin Schröter

Area
  - Total: 92.35 km^{2} (35.66 sq mi)
- Elevation: 17 m (56 ft)

Population (2025-12-31)
  - Total: 1,304
  - Density: 14.12/km^{2} (36.57/sq mi)
- Time zone: UTC+01:00 (CET)
  - Summer (DST): UTC+02:00 (CEST)
- Postal codes: 39615
- Dialling codes: 039386, 039395
- Vehicle registration: SDL

Aland (German pronunciation: [ˈaːlant]) is a municipality in the district of Stendal, in Saxony-Anhalt, Germany. It was formed on 1 January 2010 by the merger of the former municipalities Aulosen, Krüden, Pollitz and Wanzer. On 1 September 2010 it absorbed the former municipality Wahrenberg. The municipality consists of the divisions (Ortsteile) Aulosen, Krüden, Pollitz, Scharpenhufe, Vielbaum, Wanzer and Wahrenberg.
