= Altmärkische Höhe =

- Municipality
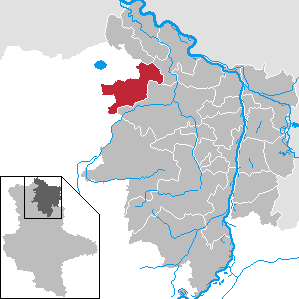
- Location of Altmärkische Höhe within Stendal district
- Interactive map of Altmärkische Höhe
- Location within Germany Location within Saxony-Anhalt
- Coordinates: 52°49′N 11°34′E
- Country: Germany
- State: Saxony-Anhalt
- District: Stendal
- Municipal assoc.: Seehausen

Government
  - Mayor (2023–30): Bernd Prange

Area
  - Total: 98.9 km^{2} (38.2 sq mi)
- Elevation: 32 m (105 ft)

Population (2025-12-31)
  - Total: 1,694
  - Density: 17.1/km^{2} (44.4/sq mi)
- Time zone: UTC+01:00 (CET)
  - Summer (DST): UTC+02:00 (CEST)
- Postal codes: 39606, 39615
- Dialling codes: 039386, 039391, 039399
- Vehicle registration: SDL

Altmärkische Höhe (German pronunciation: [ˈaltˌmɛʁkɪʃə ˈhøːə], lit. 'Altmarkian Height') is a municipality in the district of Stendal, in Saxony-Anhalt, Germany.

It was formed on 1 January 2010 by the merger of the former municipalities Boock, Bretsch, Gagel, Heiligenfelde, Kossebau, Losse and Lückstedt.
