= Bismark, Germany =

Bismark (Altmark)
- Town
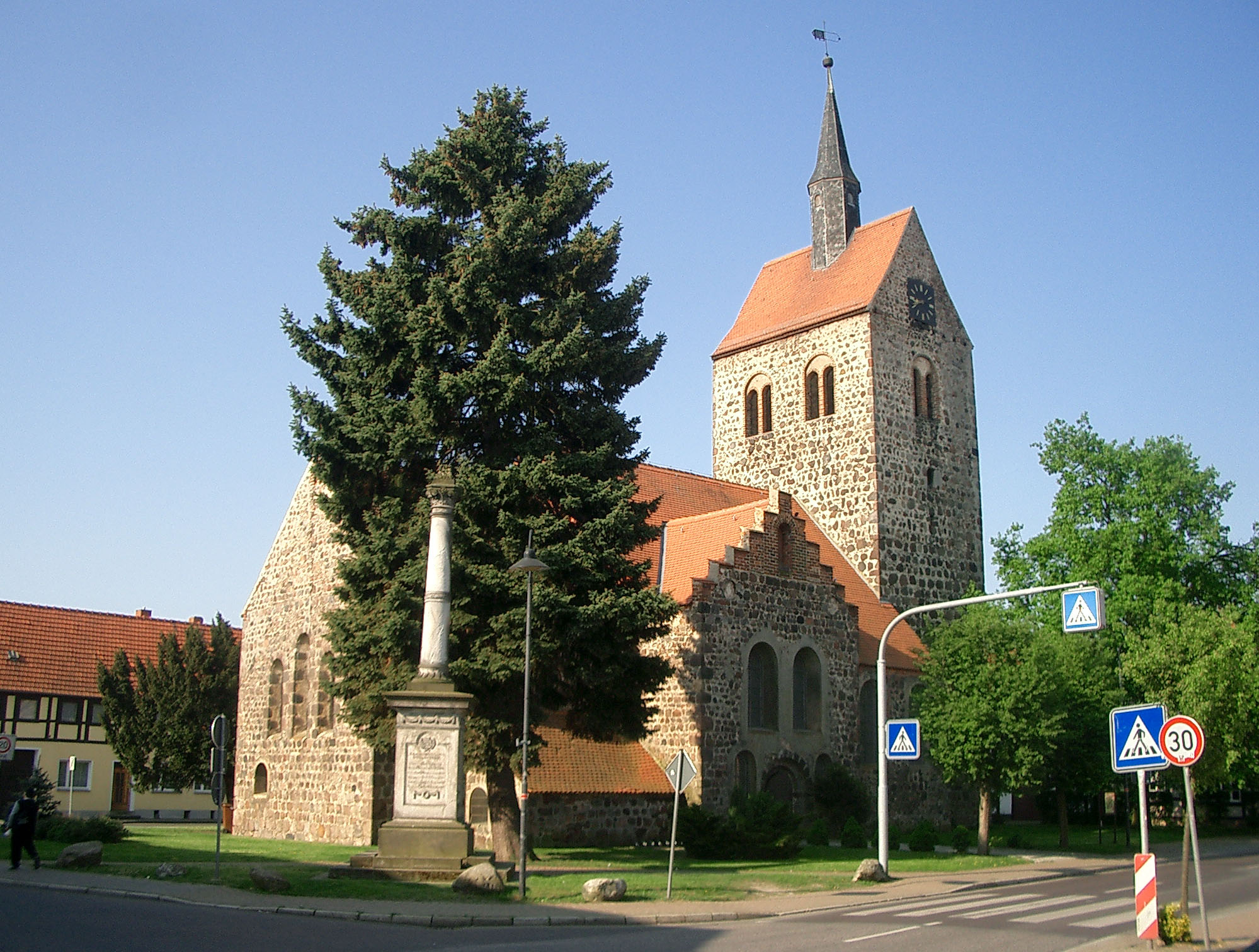
- Protestant church in Bismark

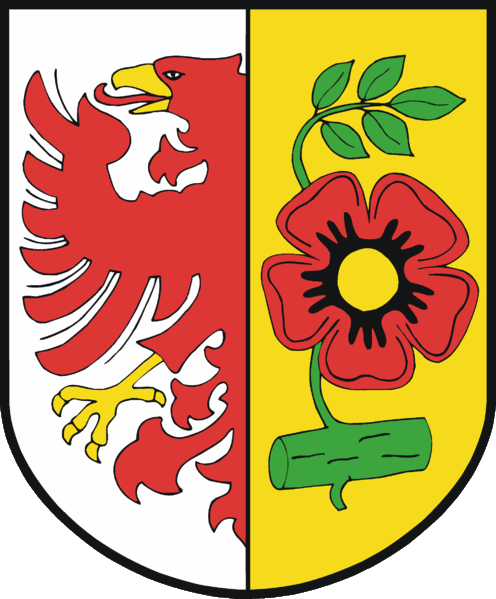
- Coat of arms

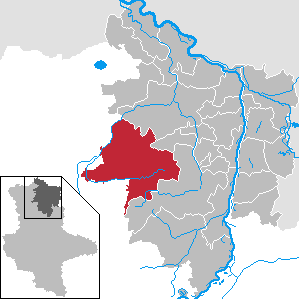
- Location of Bismark (Altmark) within Stendal district
- Interactive map of Bismark (Altmark)
- Location within Germany Location within Saxony-Anhalt
- Coordinates: 52°40′N 11°33′E
- Country: Germany
- State: Saxony-Anhalt
- District: Stendal

Government
  - Mayor (2023–30): Annegret Schwarz (CDU)

Area
  - Total: 289.45 km^{2} (111.76 sq mi)
- Elevation: 55 m (180 ft)

Population (2025-12-31)
  - Total: 7,569
  - Density: 26.15/km^{2} (67.73/sq mi)
- Time zone: UTC+01:00 (CET)
  - Summer (DST): UTC+02:00 (CEST)
- Postal codes: 39576, 39579, 39599, 39606, 39624, 39629
- Dialling codes: 039080, 039083, 039089, 039320, 039324, 039325, 039328
- Vehicle registration: SDL
- Website: www.stadt-bismark.de

Bismark (Altmark) (German pronunciation: [ˈbɪsmaʁk]) is a town in the Stendal district, in the historic Altmark region, which is located in the northern part of the state of Saxony-Anhalt, Germany. It is situated approximately 22 km (14 mi) west of Stendal in north-eastern Germany.

In the early 12th century, the area then under the rule of Albert the Bear was settled with peasants migrating from the Low Countries. The town's name is derived from the nearby river Biese (after Dutch: bies meaning rush plants); though it may also refer to the bishop's march, a possession of the Havelberg bishops mentioned in a 1209 deed issued by the Ascanian margrave Albert II. With the Altmark, Bismark was part of the Margraviate of Brandenburg until it was adjudicated to the Prussian Province of Saxony after the 1815 Congress of Vienna.

One Herbordus of Bismarck was mentioned holding the office of a Schultheiß in Stendal about 1270. His descendant Otto von Bismarck received the honorary citizenship of Bismark in 1895.

At an administrative reform that became effective on 1 January 2010, the town of Bismark absorbed the former municipalities of Badingen, Berkau, Büste, Dobberkau, Garlipp, Grassau, Hohenwulsch, Holzhausen, Käthen, Kläden, Könnigde, Kremkau, Meßdorf, Querstedt, Schäplitz, Schernikau, Schorstedt and Steinfeld. Schinne was absorbed on 1 September 2010. These 19 former municipalities and Bismark proper, that had previously co-operated in the Verwaltungsgemeinschaft Bismark/Kläden, now form the 20 Ortschaften (municipal divisions) of the town.

== Notable persons ==
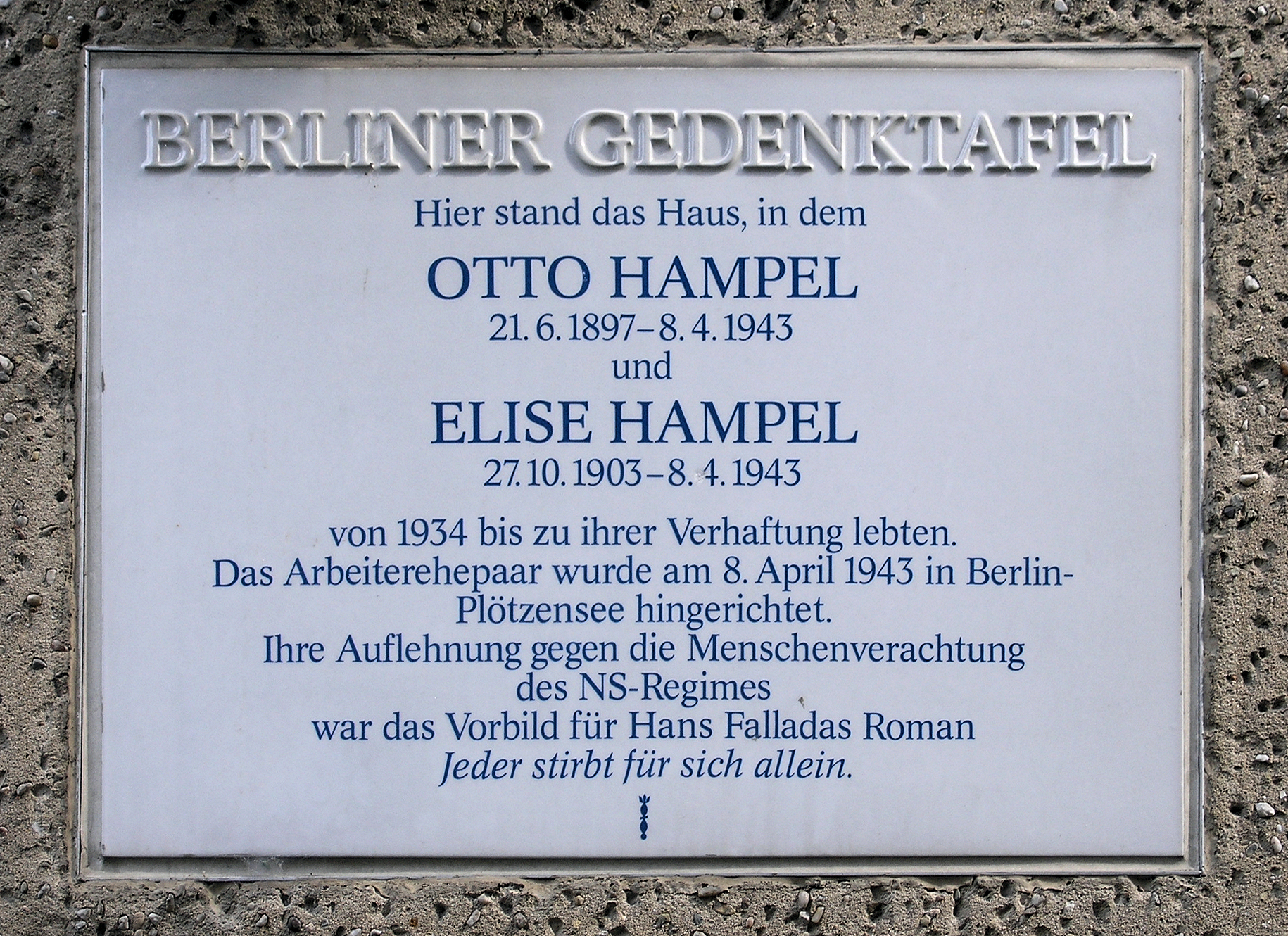
Memorial plate in Berlin-Wedding for Elise and Otto Hampel

- Elise Hampel, born Lemme (1903-1943); resistance fighter, executed on April 8, 1943 with her husband Otto Hampel in Berlin-Plötzensee.
