= Holzhausen, Saxony-Anhalt =

Holzhausen
- Stadtteil of Bismark
- Interactive map of Holzhausen
- Location within Germany Location within Saxony-Anhalt
- Coordinates: 52°38′N 11°33′E
- Country: Germany
- State: Saxony-Anhalt
- District: Stendal
- Town: Bismark

Area
  - Total: 6.81 km^{2} (2.63 sq mi)
- Elevation: 35 m (115 ft)

Population (2006-12-31)
  - Total: 117
  - Density: 17.2/km^{2} (44.5/sq mi)
- Time zone: UTC+01:00 (CET)
  - Summer (DST): UTC+02:00 (CEST)
- Postal codes: 39629
- Dialling codes: 039089

Holzhausen is a village and a former municipality in the district of Stendal, in Saxony-Anhalt, Germany.

Since 1 January 2010, it is part of the town Bismark.
