= Garlipp =

- Stadtteil of Bismark
- Interactive map of Garlipp
- Location within Germany Location within Saxony-Anhalt
- Coordinates: 52°38′24″N 11°37′0″E
- Country: Germany
- State: Saxony-Anhalt
- District: Stendal
- Town: Bismark

Area
  - Total: 6.85 km^{2} (2.64 sq mi)
- Elevation: 44 m (144 ft)

Population (2006-12-31)
  - Total: 201
  - Density: 29.3/km^{2} (76.0/sq mi)
- Time zone: UTC+01:00 (CET)
  - Summer (DST): UTC+02:00 (CEST)
- Postal codes: 39579
- Dialling codes: 039324
- Vehicle registration: SDL
- Website: www.altmark.de/vgbk

Garlipp is a village and a former municipality in the district of Stendal, in Saxony-Anhalt, Germany.

Since 1 January 2010, it is part of the town Bismark.
