= Steinfeld =

Steinfeld (German, 'stone field'), or Steinfeldt, may refer to:

== Places ==
=== Germany ===
- Steinfeld, Bavaria, a town in the district of Main-Spessart, Bavaria
- Steinfeld (Verwaltungsgemeinschaft), a municipal association in the district of Bamberg, Bavaria
- Steinfeld (Oldenburg), a municipality in the district of Vechta, Lower Saxony
- Steinfeld, Mecklenburg-Vorpommern, a municipality in the district of Bad Doberan, Mecklenburg-Vorpommern
- Raben Steinfeld, a municipality in the district of Parchim, Mecklenburg-Vorpommern
- Steinfeld, Rhineland-Palatinate, a municipality in the district Südliche Weinstraße, Rhineland-Palatinate
- Steinfeld, Saxony-Anhalt, a municipality in the district of Stendal, Saxony-Anhalt
- Steinfeld, Schleswig-Holstein, a municipality in the district of Schleswig-Flensburg, Schleswig-Holstein

=== Austria ===
- Steinfeld, Austria, a municipality in Carinthia

=== Australia ===
- Steinfeld, South Australia, also known as Stonefield

=== Romania ===
- Steinfeld, the former German name for Uriu, a commune in Bistrița-Năsăud County, Transylvania

== People ==
- Franz Steinfeld (1787–1868), Austrian painter
- Hailee Steinfeld (born 1996), American actress, singer and model
- Harry Steinfeldt (1877–1914), American baseball player
- Jake Steinfeld (born 1958), American actor and fitness instructor
- William M. Steinfeldt (1917–2006), American politician from New York
