= Berkau =

- Stadtteil of Bismark
- Interactive map of Berkau
- Location within Germany Location within Saxony-Anhalt
- Coordinates: 52°38′N 11°29′E
- Country: Germany
- State: Saxony-Anhalt
- District: Stendal
- Town: Bismark

Area
  - Total: 18.93 km^{2} (7.31 sq mi)
- Elevation: 44 m (144 ft)

Population (2006-12-31)
  - Total: 485
  - Density: 25.6/km^{2} (66.4/sq mi)
- Time zone: UTC+01:00 (CET)
  - Summer (DST): UTC+02:00 (CEST)
- Postal codes: 39624
- Dialling codes: 039089

Berkau is a village and a former municipality in the district of Stendal, in Saxony-Anhalt, Germany. Since 1 January 2010, it is part of the town Bismark.
