= Kläden (Bismark) =

- Ortschaft of Bismark
- Coat of arms
- Interactive map of Kläden
- Location within Germany Location within Saxony-Anhalt
- Coordinates: 52°38′N 11°40′E
- Country: Germany
- State: Saxony-Anhalt
- District: Stendal
- Town: Bismark

Area
  - Total: 14.45 km^{2} (5.58 sq mi)
- Elevation: 38 m (125 ft)

Population (2006-12-31)
  - Total: 729
  - Density: 50.4/km^{2} (131/sq mi)
- Time zone: UTC+01:00 (CET)
  - Summer (DST): UTC+02:00 (CEST)
- Postal codes: 39579
- Dialling codes: 039324

Kläden is a village and a former municipality in the district of Stendal, in Saxony-Anhalt, Germany. Since 1 January 2010, it is part of the town Bismark, of which it is an Ortschaft. Before that, it was part of the Verwaltungsgemeinschaft Bismark/Kläden.
