= Eichstedt =

Eichstedt (Altmark)
- Municipality
- Coat of arms

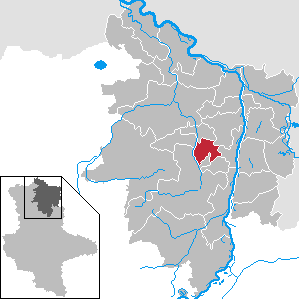
- Location of Eichstedt (Altmark) within Stendal district
- Interactive map of Eichstedt (Altmark)
- Location within Germany Location within Saxony-Anhalt
- Coordinates: 52°41′N 11°51′E
- Country: Germany
- State: Saxony-Anhalt
- District: Stendal
- Municipal assoc.: Arneburg-Goldbeck

Government
  - Mayor (2023–30): Matthias Templin

Area
  - Total: 32.82 km^{2} (12.67 sq mi)
- Elevation: 34 m (112 ft)

Population (2025-12-31)
  - Total: 834
  - Density: 25.4/km^{2} (65.8/sq mi)
- Time zone: UTC+01:00 (CET)
  - Summer (DST): UTC+02:00 (CEST)
- Postal codes: 39596
- Dialling codes: 039388
- Vehicle registration: SDL
- Website: www.arneburg-goldbeck.de

Eichstedt (Altmark) (German pronunciation: [ˈaɪçʃtɛt]) is a municipality in the district of Stendal, in Saxony-Anhalt, Germany. On 1 January 2010, it absorbed the former municipalities of Baben and Lindtorf.
