= Minna Nanitz =

German operatic mezzo-soprano

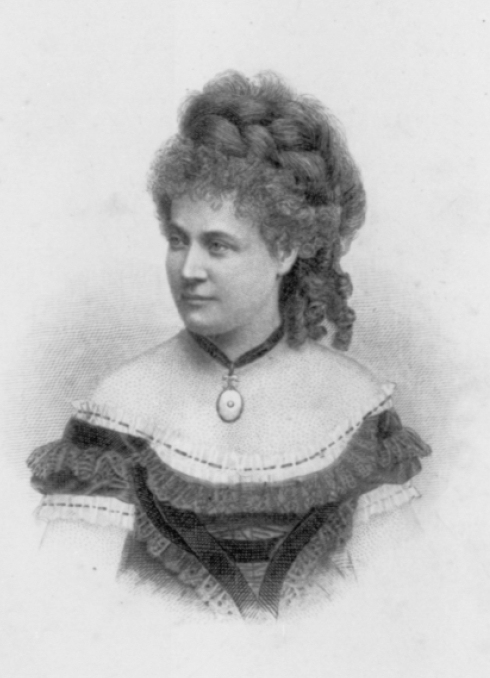
Minna Nanitz

Minna Louise Nanitz (8 October 1842 – 19 or 20 July 1903) was a German operatic mezzo-soprano.

== Lifestyle ==
Born in Seehausen, Altmark, Nanitz worked as an opera singer in Hanover and as a royal court opera singer at the Semperoper from 1870 to 1885. She was the successor to Aloyse Michalesi. Her most important roles were Ortrud in Wagner's Lohengrin, Amneris in Giuseppe Verdi's Aida and Frau Reich in The Merry Wives of Windsor by Nicolai. On 21 March 1874, she sang in the world premiere of the opera Die Folkunger by Edmund Kretschmer. In addition to her work at the opera, she was also successful as a concert and oratorio singer. Nanitz died in Karlovy Vary at the age of 60.
