= Grassau, Saxony-Anhalt =

Grassau
- Stadtteil of Bismark
- Interactive map of Grassau
- Location within Germany Location within Saxony-Anhalt
- Coordinates: 52°40′N 11°41′E
- Country: Germany
- State: Saxony-Anhalt
- District: Stendal
- Town: Bismark

Area
  - Total: 16.17 km^{2} (6.24 sq mi)
- Elevation: 44 m (144 ft)

Population (2006-12-31)
  - Total: 288
  - Density: 17.8/km^{2} (46.1/sq mi)
- Time zone: UTC+01:00 (CET)
  - Summer (DST): UTC+02:00 (CEST)
- Postal codes: 39579
- Dialling codes: 039324
- Website: www.stadt-bismark.de/grassau

Grassau is a village and a former municipality in the district of Stendal, in Saxony-Anhalt, Germany.

Since 1 January 2010, it is part of the town Bismark.
