= Losse (surname) =

== Notable people with the surname Losse ==
- Katherine Losse, American writer
- Michael Losse (born * 1960), a German art historian
- Thomas Losse-Müller (born 1973), a German politician
- Bettina Bähr-Losse (born 1967), a German lawyer and politician
