= Seehausen, Altmark =

Seehausen
- Town
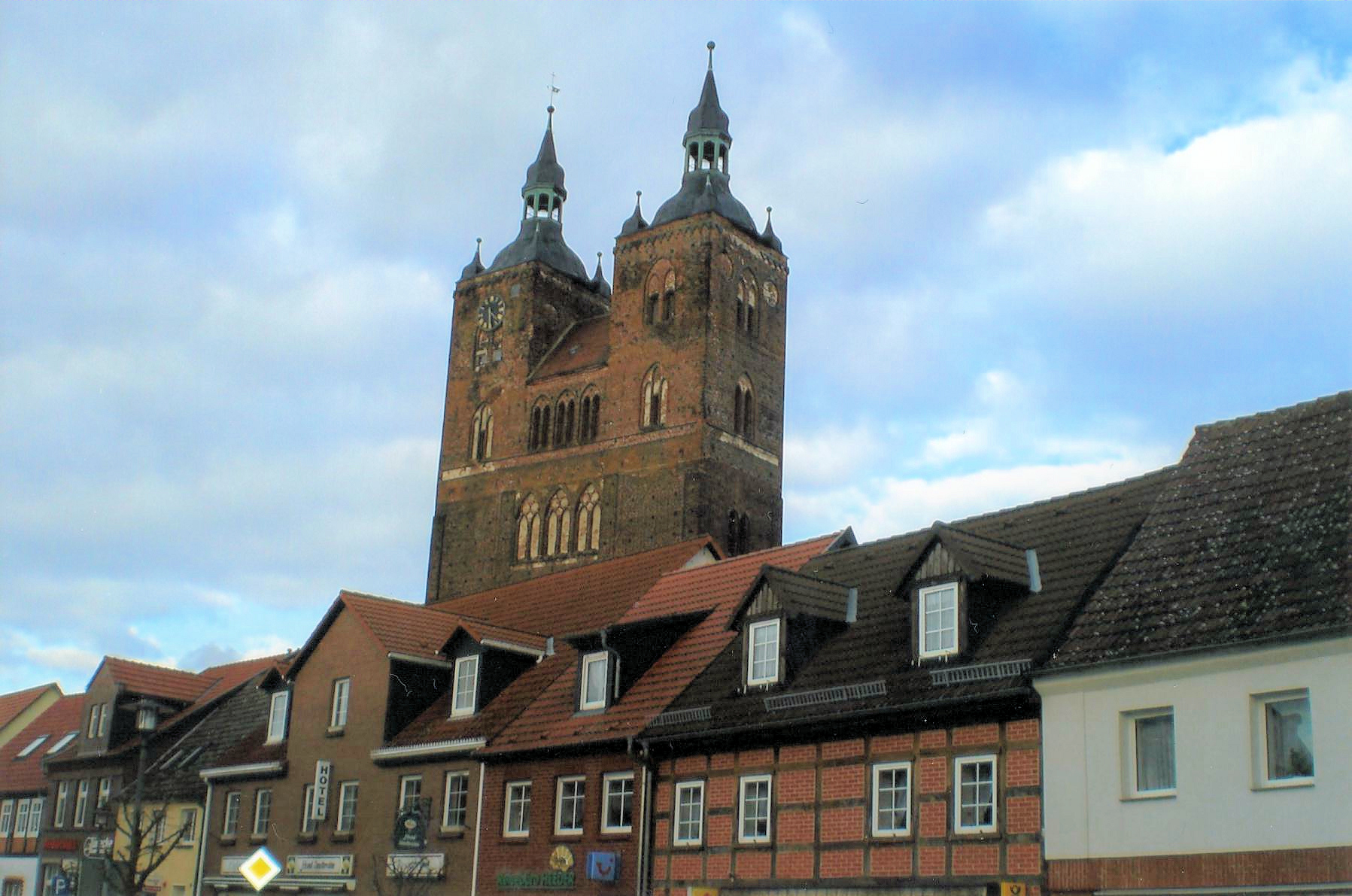
- Saints Peter and Paul Church

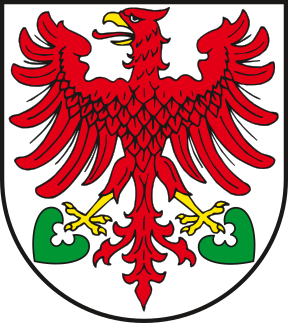
- Coat of arms

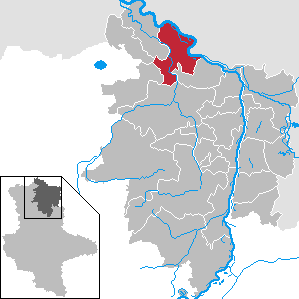
- Location of Seehausen within Stendal district
- Interactive map of Seehausen
- Location within Germany Location within Saxony-Anhalt
- Coordinates: 52°52′N 11°45′E
- Country: Germany
- State: Saxony-Anhalt
- District: Stendal
- Municipal assoc.: Seehausen (Altmark)

Government
  - Mayor (2019–26): Detlef Neumann

Area
  - Total: 107.01 km^{2} (41.32 sq mi)
- Elevation: 19 m (62 ft)

Population (2025-12-31)
  - Total: 4,491
  - Density: 41.97/km^{2} (108.7/sq mi)
- Time zone: UTC+01:00 (CET)
  - Summer (DST): UTC+02:00 (CEST)
- Postal codes: 39615
- Dialling codes: 039386, 039397
- Vehicle registration: SDL
- Website: seehausen-altmark.de

Seehausen (German pronunciation: [ˈzeːhaʊzn̩]) is a town in the district of Stendal, in Saxony-Anhalt, in northern Germany. It is situated approximately 30 km (19 mi) north of Stendal in the Altmark, a historic region in Germany, comprising the northern third of Saxony-Anhalt. In January 2010 it absorbed the former municipalities Beuster, Geestgottberg and Losenrade, and in September 2010 Schönberg.

Seehausen is the seat of the Verbandsgemeinde Seehausen (Altmark).

== History ==
The oldest document in which Seehausen was mentioned was written in 1174. Seehausen developed on river Aland in the middle of the 12th century, but the first settlement called "Altstadt" was left in the middle of the 14th century and a new town was laid out in the north. Many immigrants from the Netherlands settled down in the area after 1251. In the Middle Ages Seehausen developed into a wealthy trade centre which was surrounded by a moat and a wall. It became a member of the Hanseatic League in 1359. As river Aland was navigable goods produced in Seeland and the area around like wheat, linnen and wool could easily be transported to the other hanseatic towns and cities. A small harbour on river Elbe just five kms from Seehausen was built in 1409.

During the final stages of World War II, on 12 March 1945, Beuster (present district) was the site of a stopover during the German-organised march of French prisoners of war from the Oflag II-B camp to the Oflag VI-A camp.

== Sights ==
The centre of Seehausen is St.Petri Church which was built 1170–1180 in a romanesque style and transformed into a gothic hall church between 1440–1480. The height of its impressive towers amounts to 62 metres. Its baroque pulpit dates from 1710, and the wood carvings of the altar, a winged altarpiece were made in the Netherlands in the 15th century The organ which dates from 1867 was renovated in 2014.

The Town Hall was built of bricks in neogothic style and inaugurated in 1883.

A part of the medieval town wall with a height of up to 4 metres dating from the 15th century is left and can be visited in Petristraße. The ancient rampart and moat is well-preserved, e.g. close to the former gate "Beustertor" at Hoher Wall Street. Beustertor (15th century) gate is the only one of five gates which was not demolished in the 19th century. It was the most important gate because the road to the harbour on river Elbe started from here.

Seehausen has many well-preserved half-timbered houses, especially in Beusterstraße, Steinstraße and Petristraße (built around 1750). The church of a former monastery which had been dissolved in 1547 was transformed into a salt depot and named "Salzkirche (Salt Church)". It was built around 1460 in a brick gothic style typical for hanseatic towns. After a renovation in 1997 it was transformed into a hall for concerts and other cultural events. - The Turmuhrenmuseum is an exhibition of church-clocks and historical clocks. Opposite the railway station a wall painting in the socialist style of the former GDR can be seen.

There are various sights in the villages which were incorporated into Seehausen in 2010, e.g. St.Nikolaus Church (built from 1150 to 1184) in Beuster. In Beuster the Blaulichtmuseum is worth a visit as well. It is a collection of army, police and ambulance vehicles. Two megalith graves from Stone Age which are about 5,000 years old can be visited near Bretsch.

== Climate ==
Climate data for Seehausen (1991–2020 normals)
Month	Jan	Feb	Mar	Apr	May	Jun	Jul	Aug	Sep	Oct	Nov	Dec	Year
Mean daily maximum °C (°F)	3.6 (38.5)	5.0 (41.0)	9.0 (48.2)	15.1 (59.2)	19.5 (67.1)	22.6 (72.7)	24.9 (76.8)	24.5 (76.1)	19.8 (67.6)	13.9 (57.0)	7.8 (46.0)	4.5 (40.1)	14.2 (57.6)
Daily mean °C (°F)	1.2 (34.2)	1.8 (35.2)	4.6 (40.3)	9.2 (48.6)	13.6 (56.5)	16.9 (62.4)	19.0 (66.2)	18.4 (65.1)	14.3 (57.7)	9.5 (49.1)	5.0 (41.0)	2.2 (36.0)	9.6 (49.3)
Mean daily minimum °C (°F)	−1.5 (29.3)	−1.3 (29.7)	0.5 (32.9)	3.3 (37.9)	7.3 (45.1)	10.7 (51.3)	13.0 (55.4)	12.6 (54.7)	9.2 (48.6)	5.4 (41.7)	2.2 (36.0)	−0.3 (31.5)	5.1 (41.2)
Average precipitation mm (inches)	48.5 (1.91)	34.9 (1.37)	39.6 (1.56)	30.0 (1.18)	47.6 (1.87)	55.2 (2.17)	67.2 (2.65)	56.2 (2.21)	48.6 (1.91)	46.4 (1.83)	43.4 (1.71)	46.4 (1.83)	563.9 (22.20)
Average precipitation days (≥ 1.0 mm)	16.9	14.6	14.8	11.3	12.3	13.2	14.9	13.5	12.7	14.0	15.4	16.6	170
Average snowy days (≥ 1.0 cm)	7.2	6.9	2.7	0.1	0	0	0	0	0	0	1.2	4.1	22.2
Average relative humidity (%)	86.6	82.9	78.1	70.5	69.1	68.8	69.3	71.5	77.5	83.9	88.9	88.2	77.9
Mean monthly sunshine hours	48.8	73.7	126.4	193.7	232.0	233.9	227.7	210.5	161.0	114.6	51.1	37.8	1,711.1
Source: World Meteorological Organization

== Economy and infrastructure ==
Seehausen has a railway station on the Magdeburg-Wittenberge railway which was built from 1846 to 1849. There are good rail connections to Berlin and Hamburg via Wittenberge, Seehausen's neighbouring town in the North.The town will be connected to Magdeburg and to the harbour of Wismar by two exits of motorway 14 which is under construction. The inauguration was planned for 2025. Agriculture and food processing have always played an important part in the Altmark. The metal-working industry is a most important economic factor of Seehausen and tourism is gaining importance as well. Tourism in Altmark is benefiting from the trend towards nature and activeholidays.

== Sports and leisure ==
Hiking, cycling and horse-riding are common in Seehausen and its surroundings. Schillerhain, a large park in the South of Seehausen was laid out as early as 1852. It was inaugurated as a public park and named after the playwright Friedrich Schiller in 1859. Waldbad, a public outdoor swimming pool in the park, founded in 1938 and renovated several times, is visited by many locals and tourists.

== Gallery ==
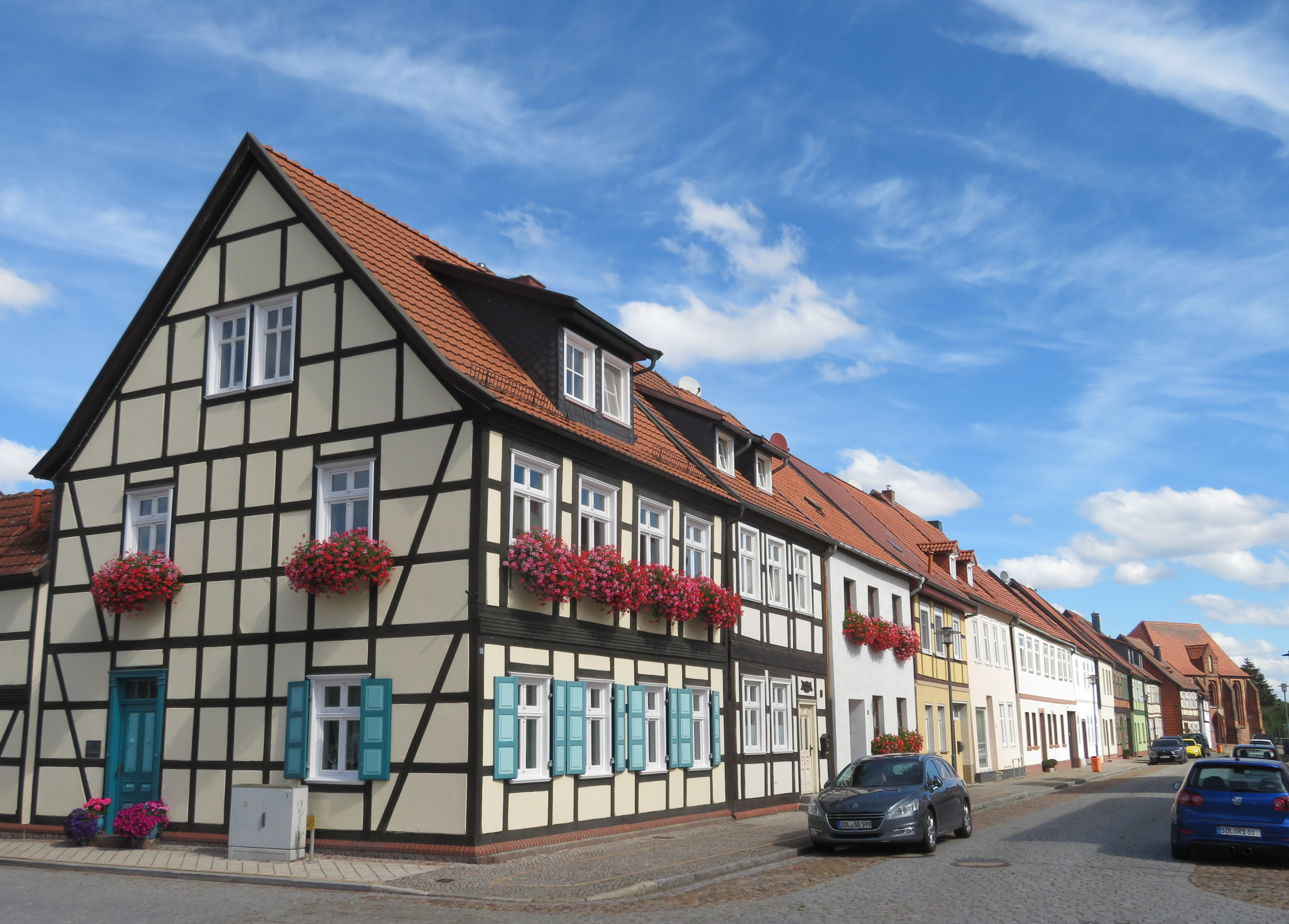
Half-timbered houses in Beusterstraße

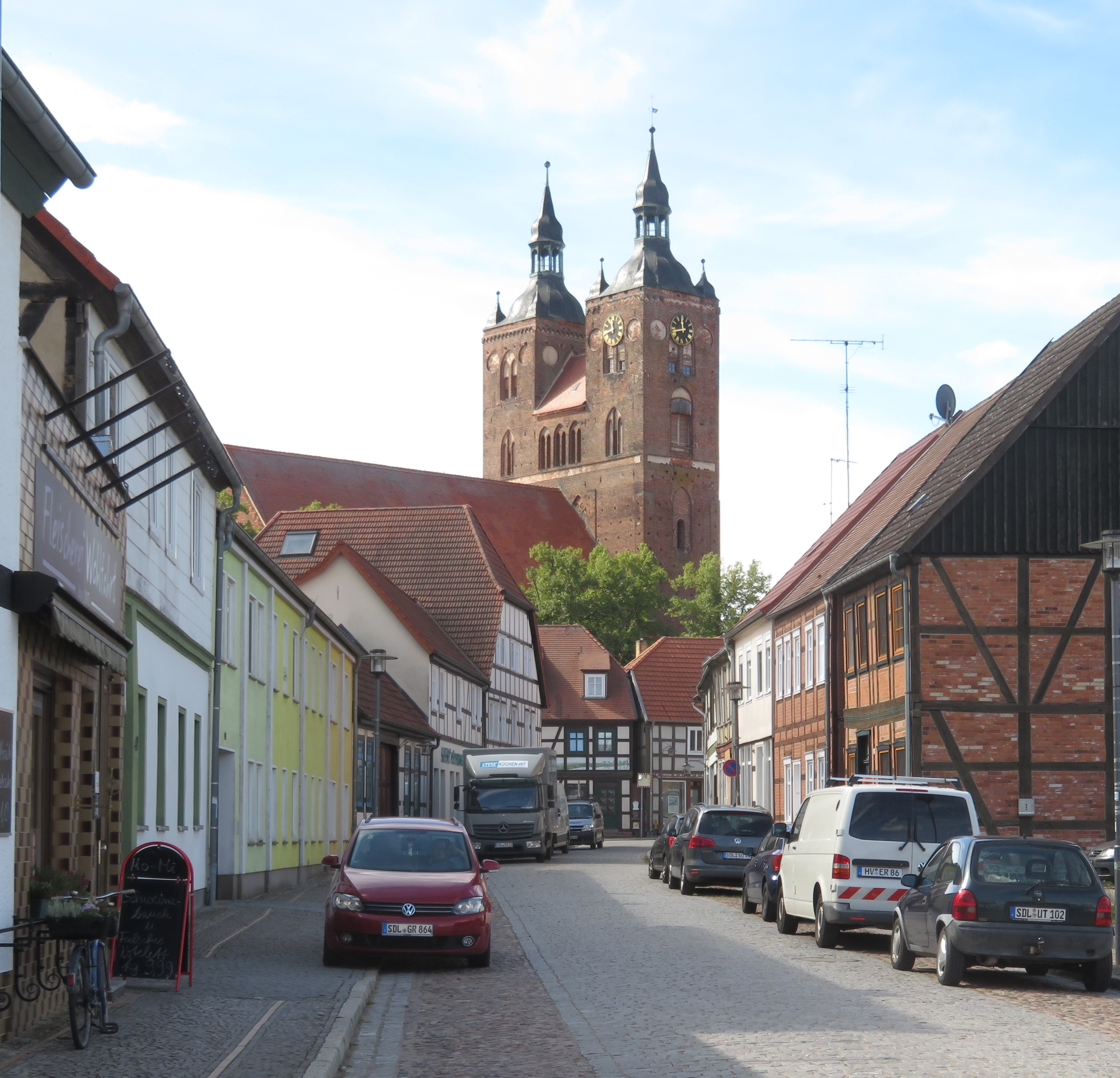
St. Petri Church

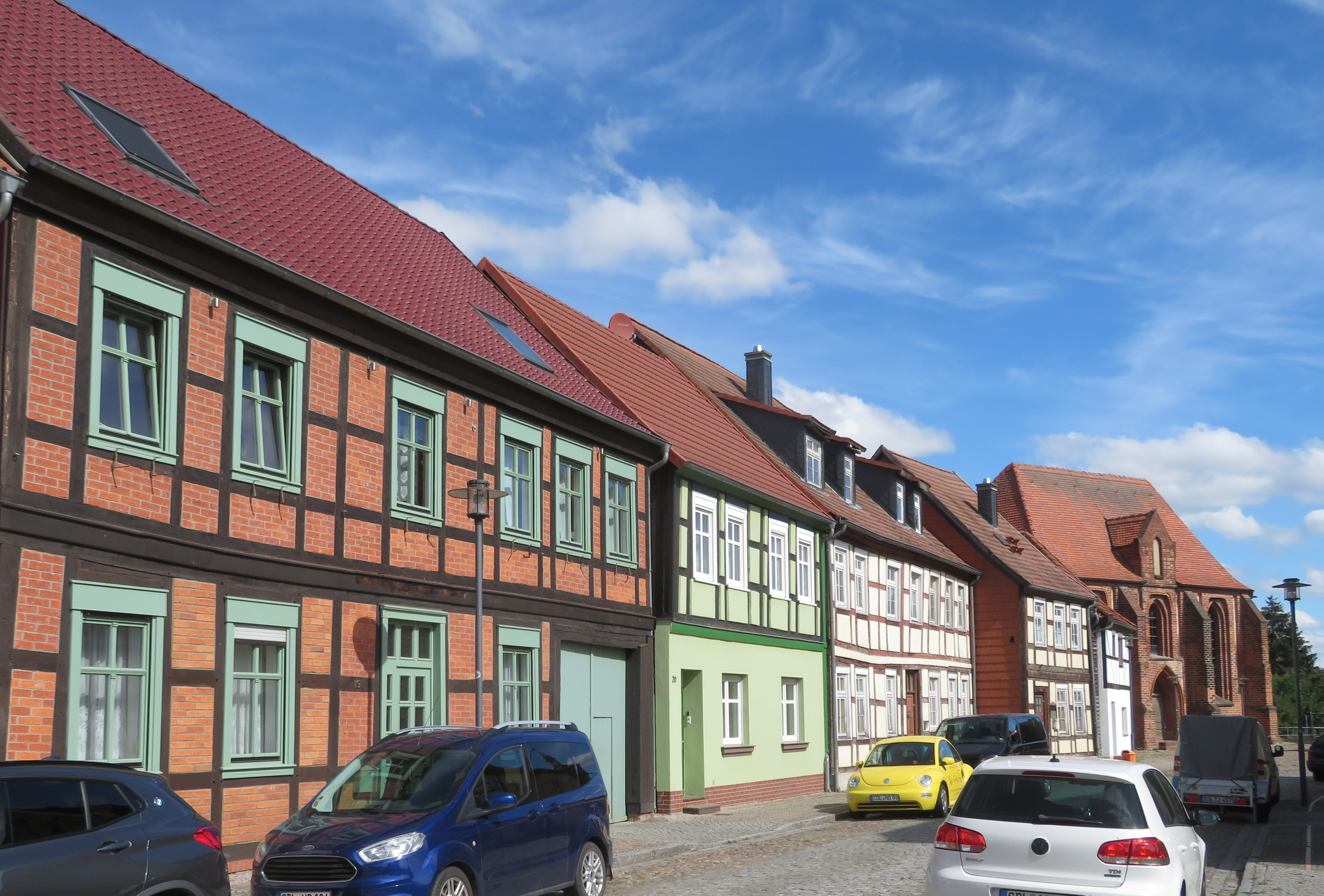
Half-timbered houses in Beusterstraße with Salt Church

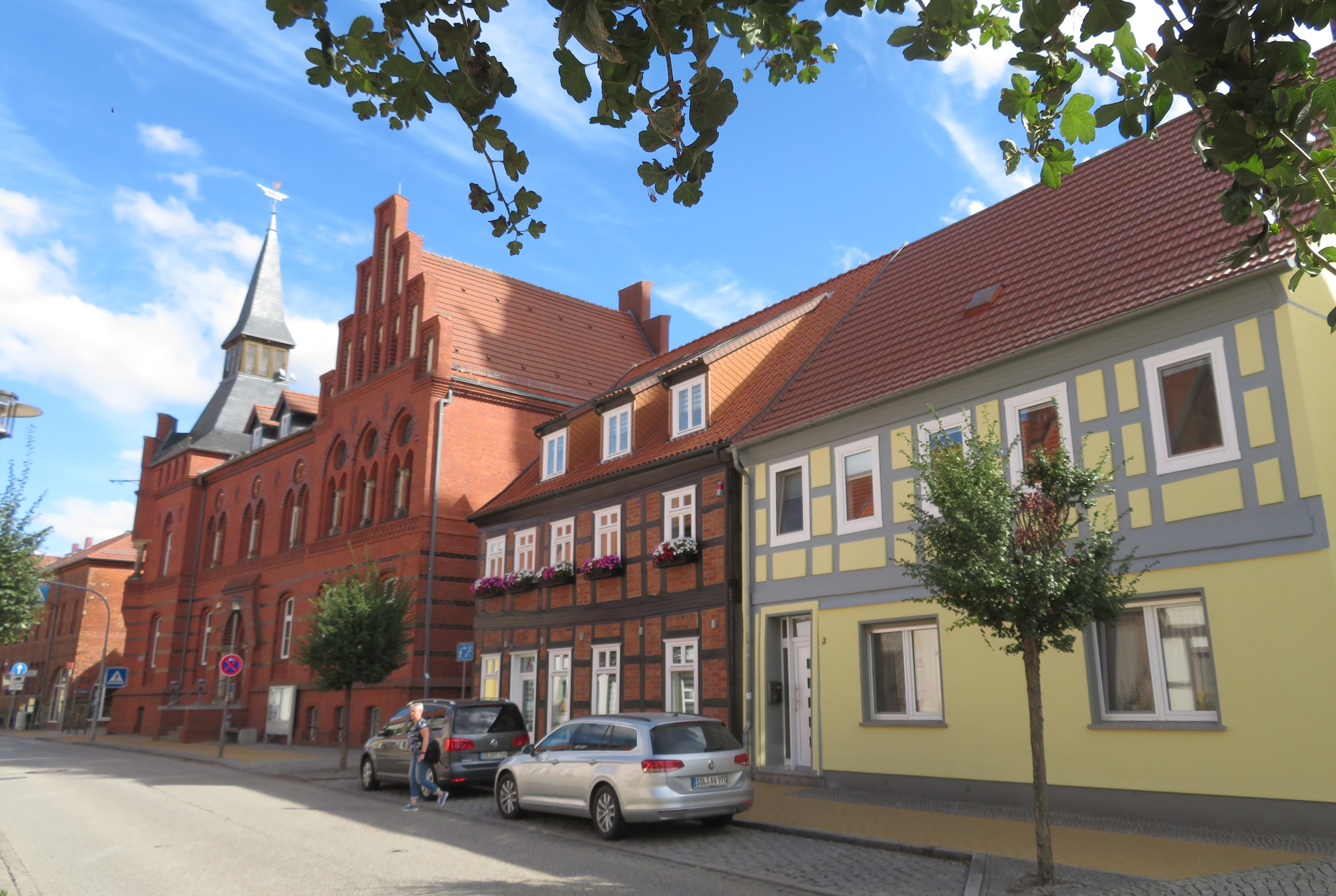
Town Hall

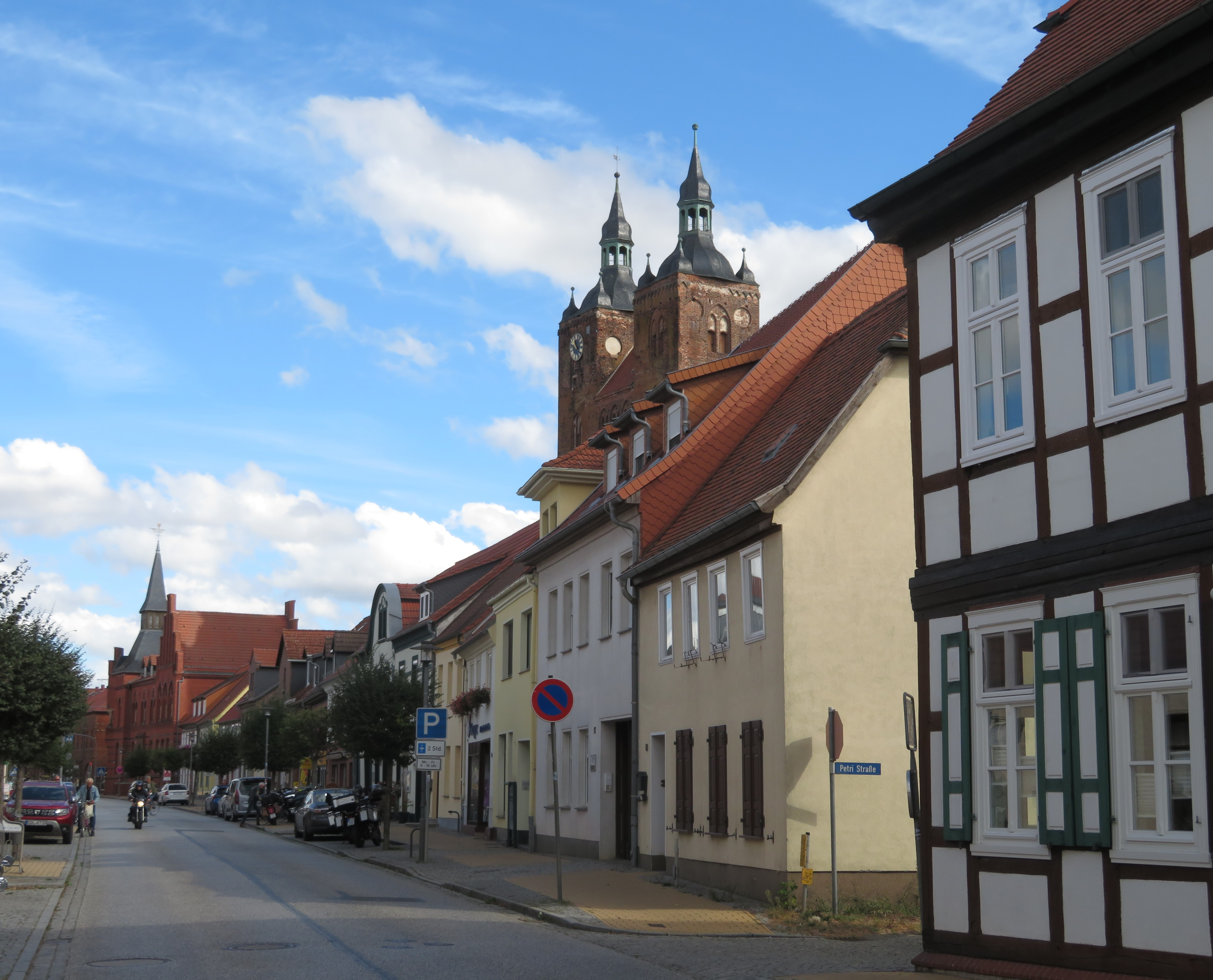
Main Street (Große Brüderstraße)

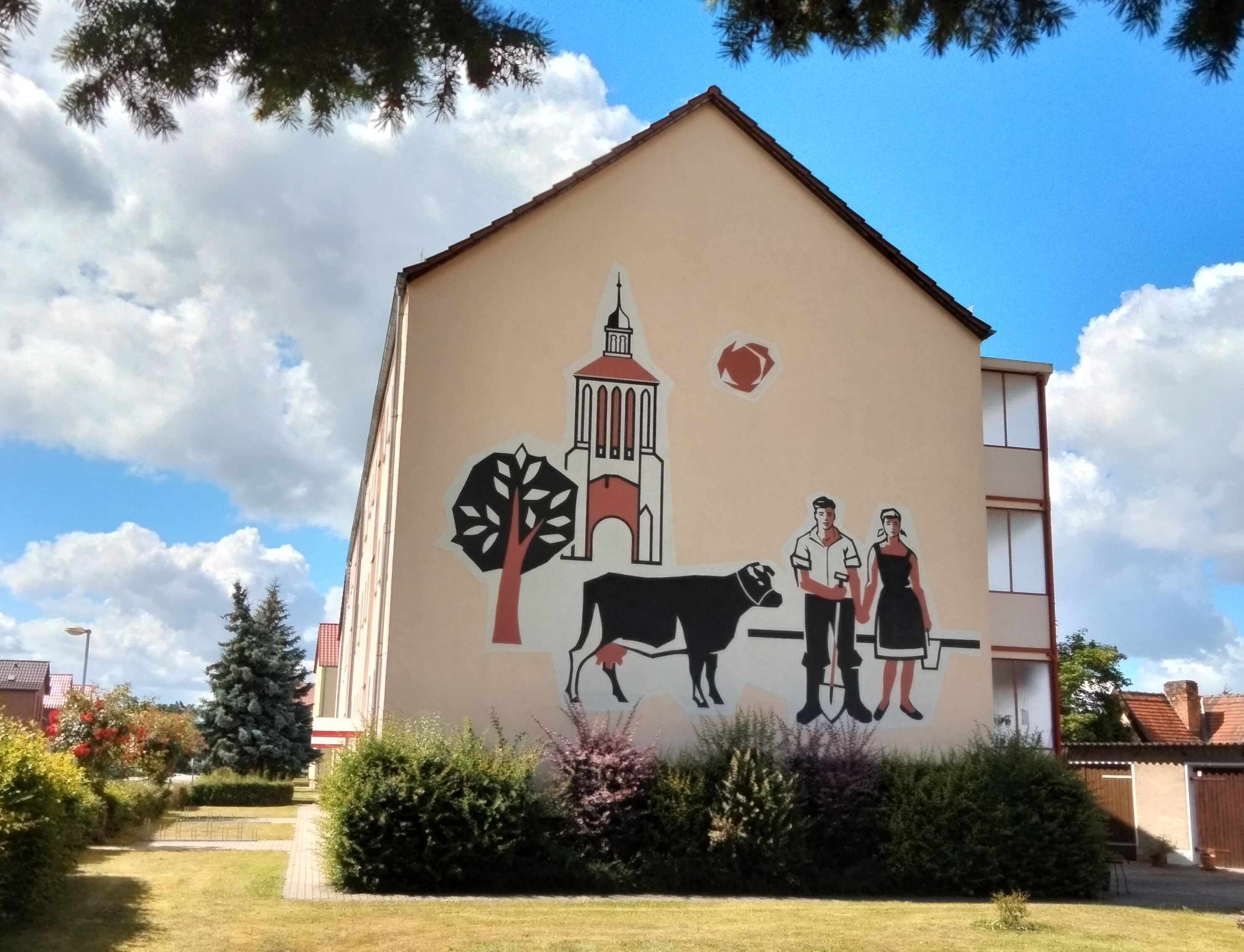
Wall painting in a socialist style

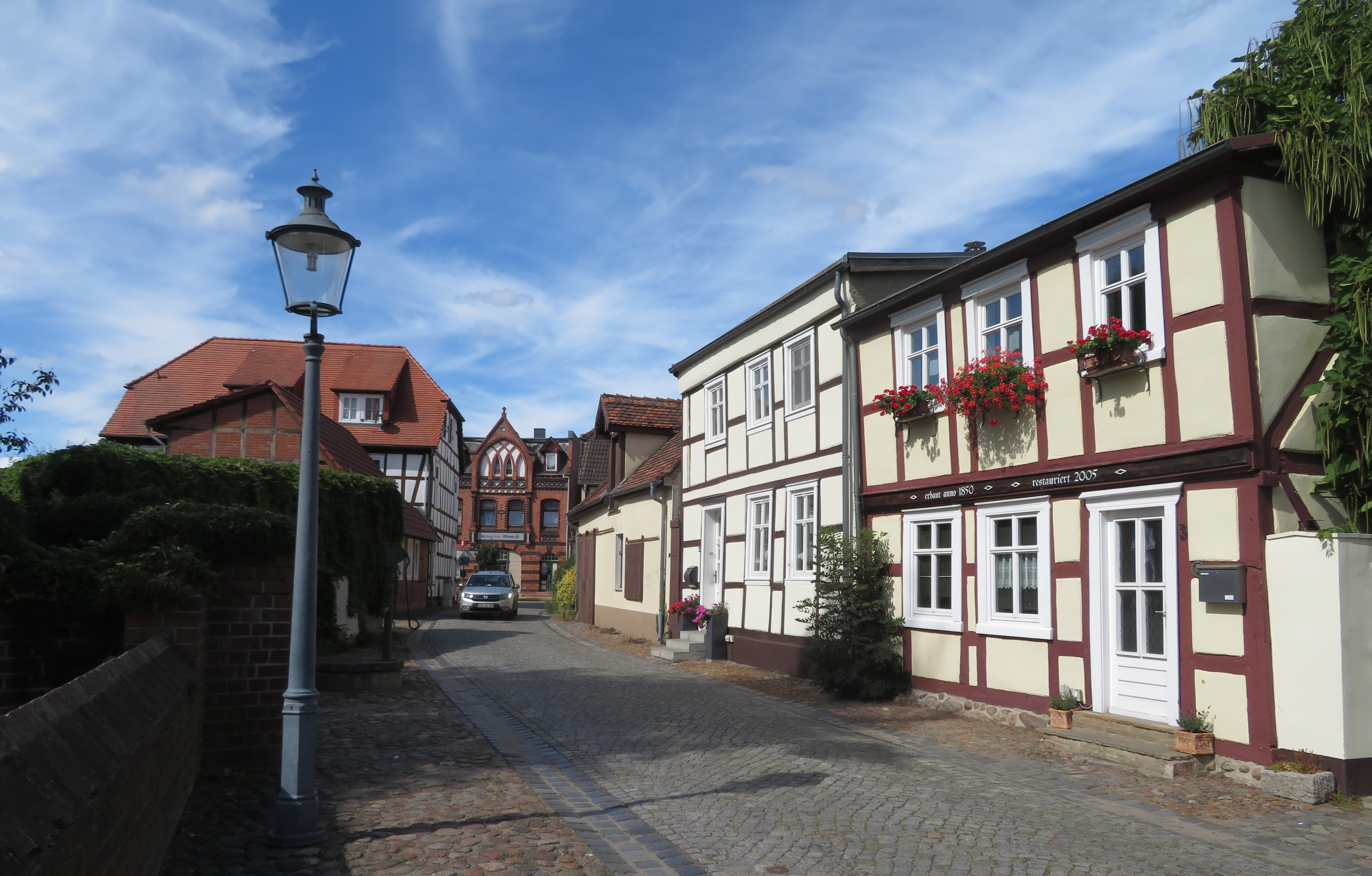
Medieval town wall (left) in Petristraße

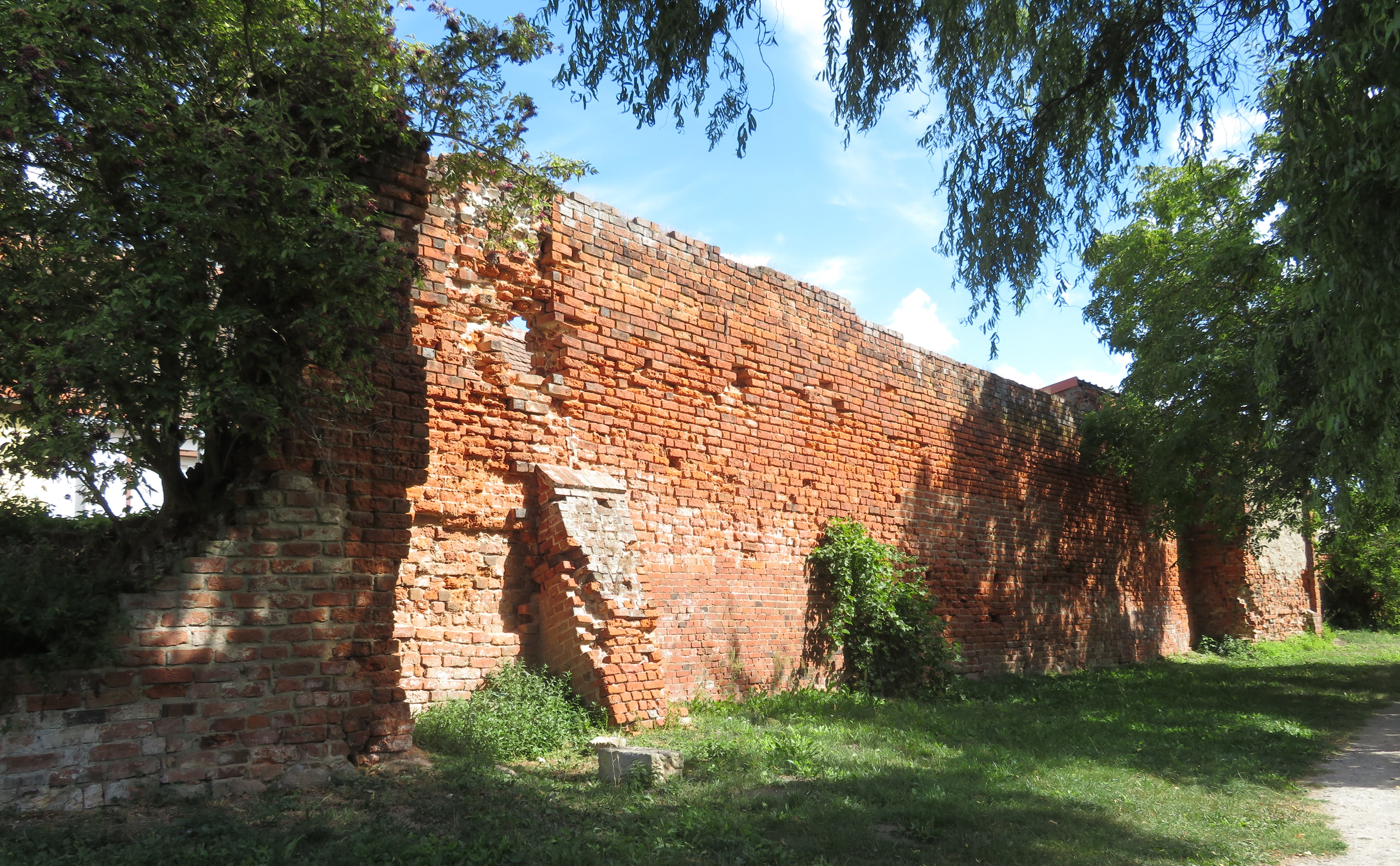
Medieval town wall

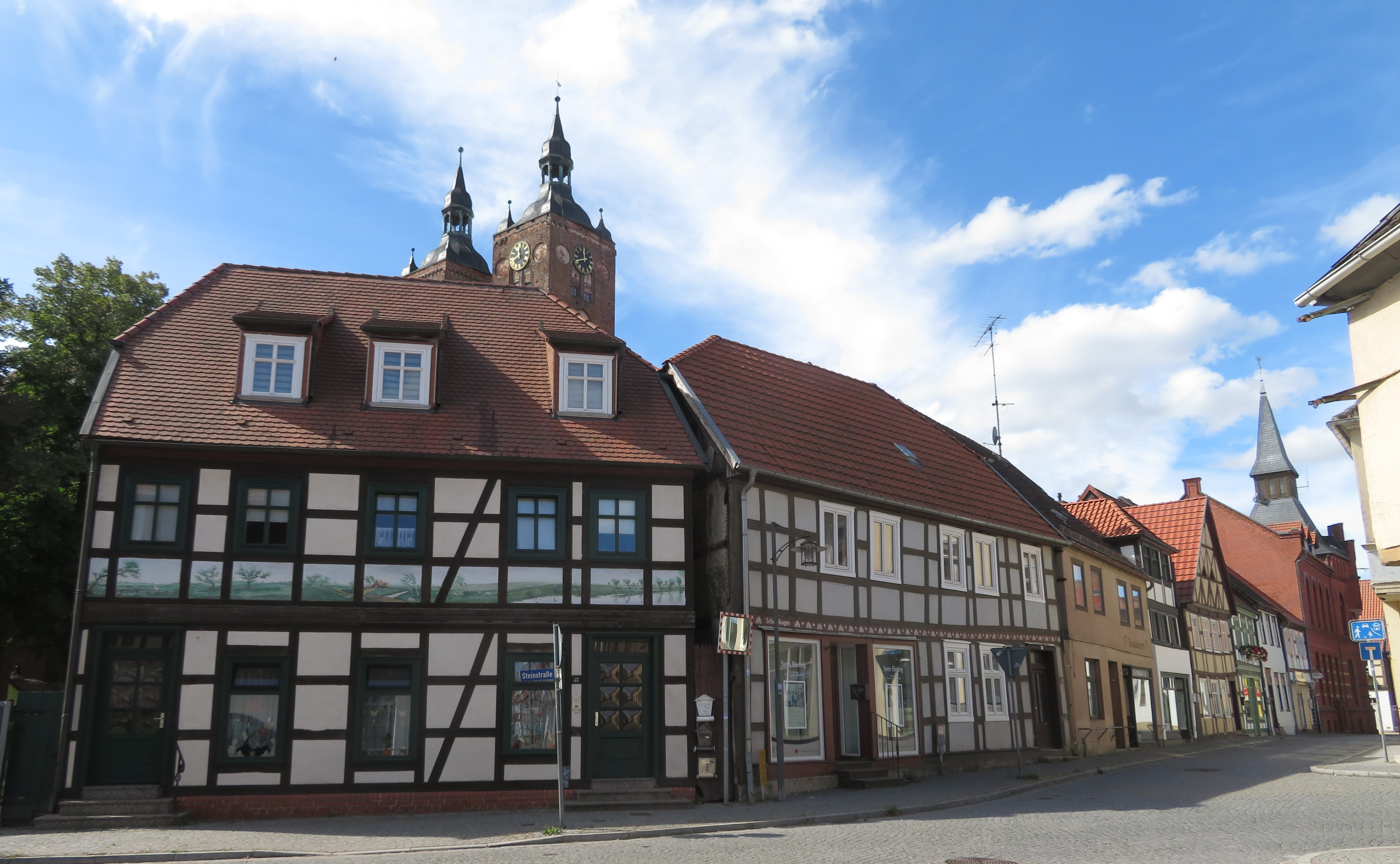
Half-timbered houses in Steinstraße

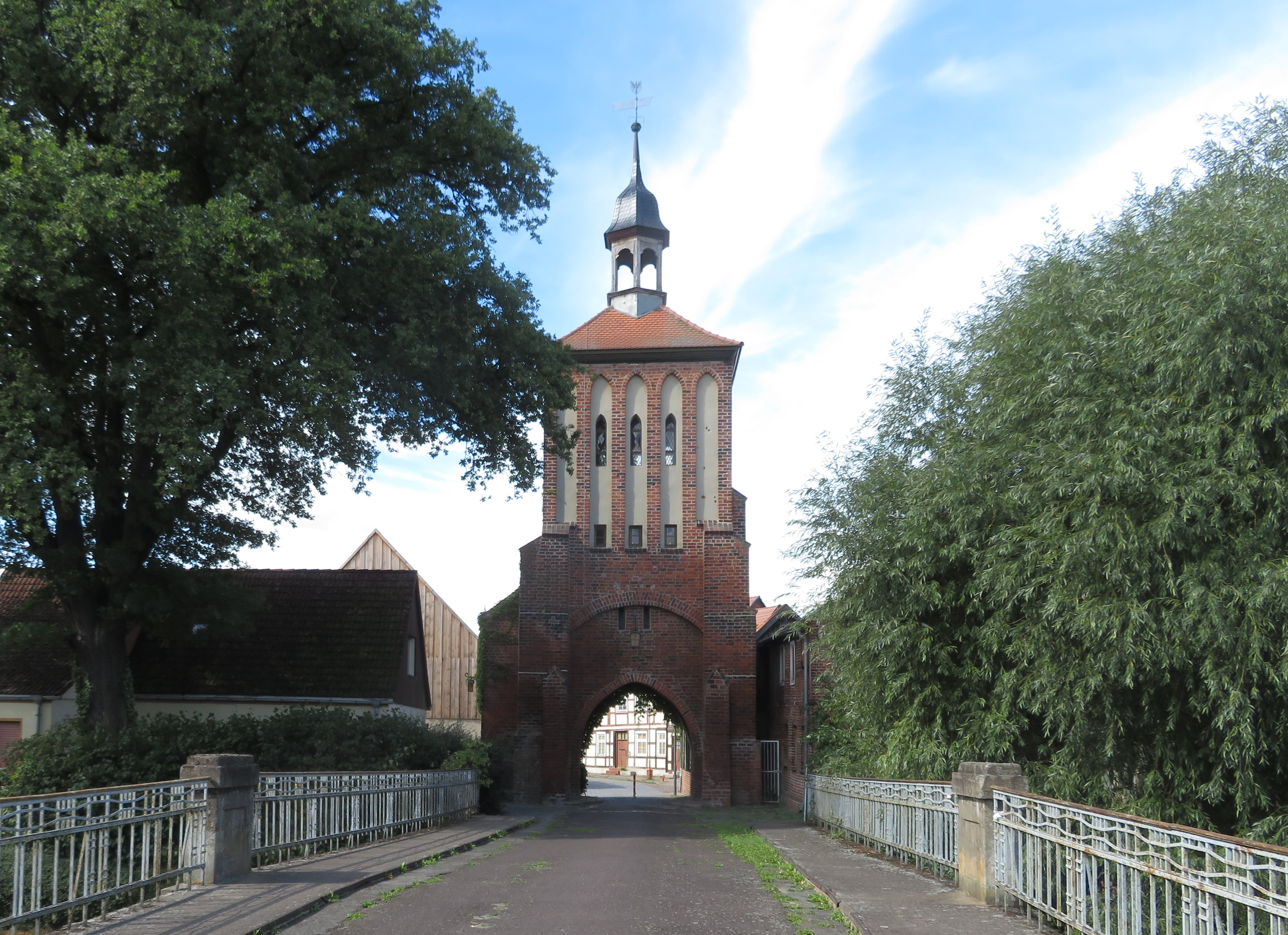
Gate Beustertor

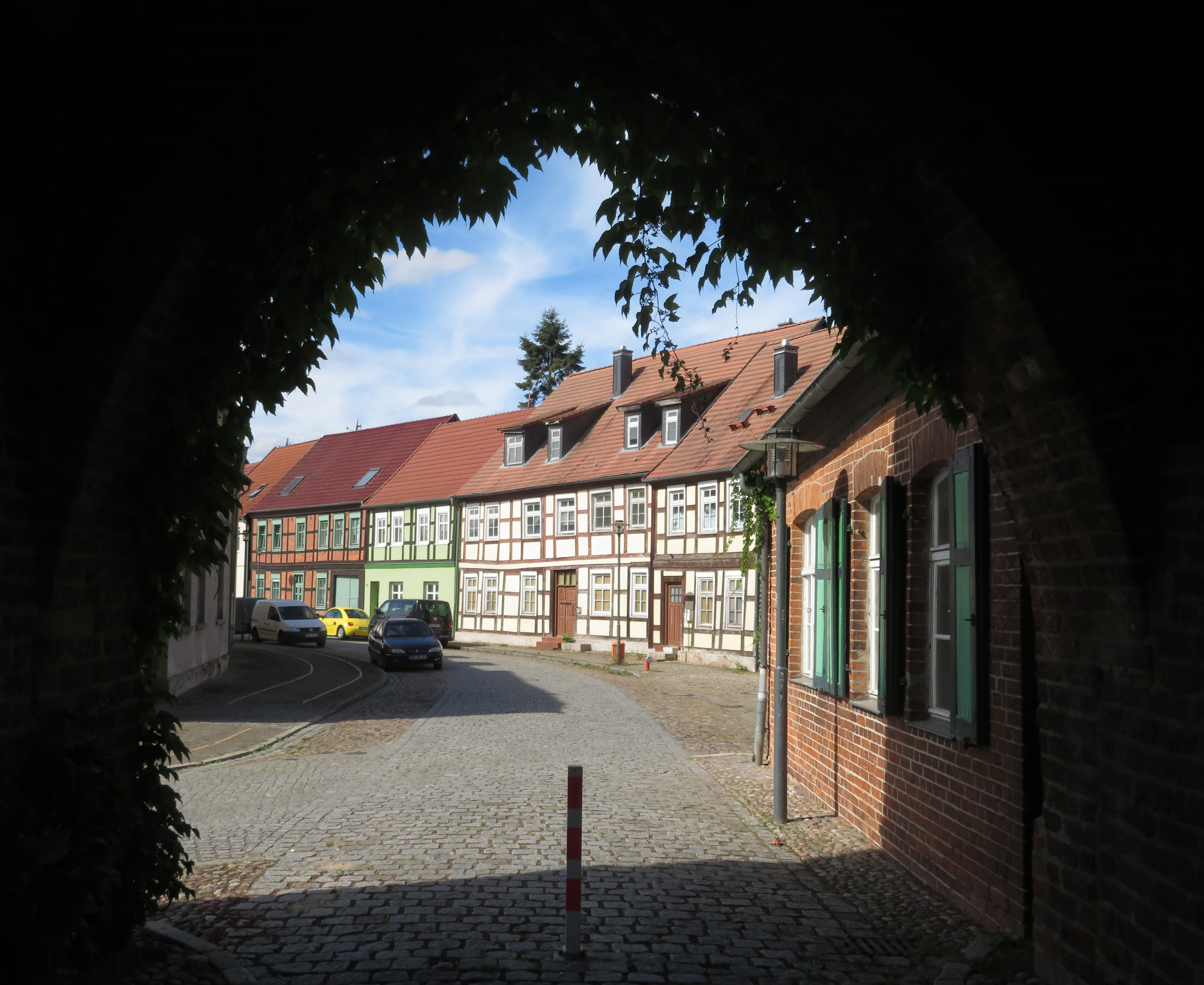
Beusterstraße as seen from Beustertor Gate

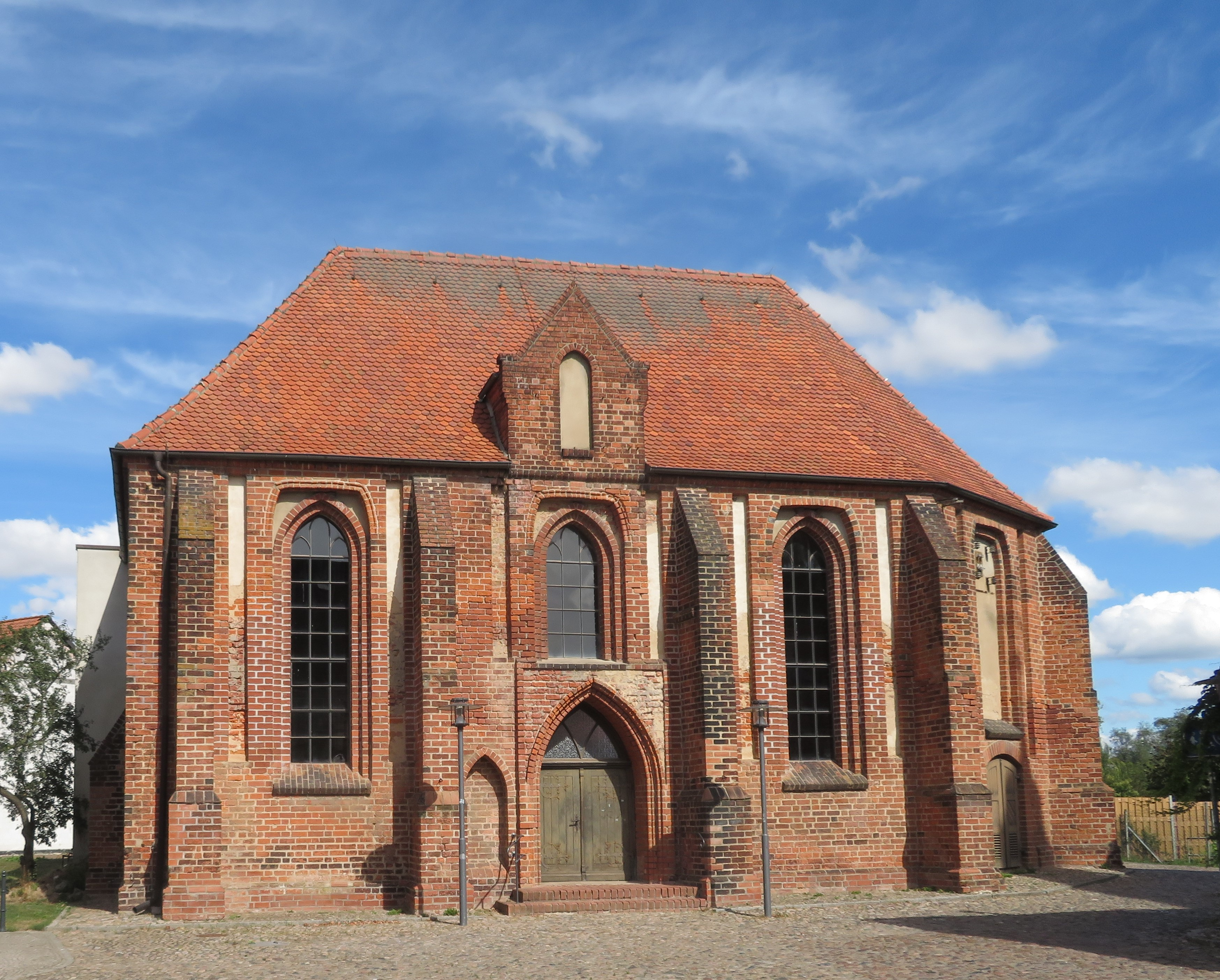
Former church "Salzkirche"

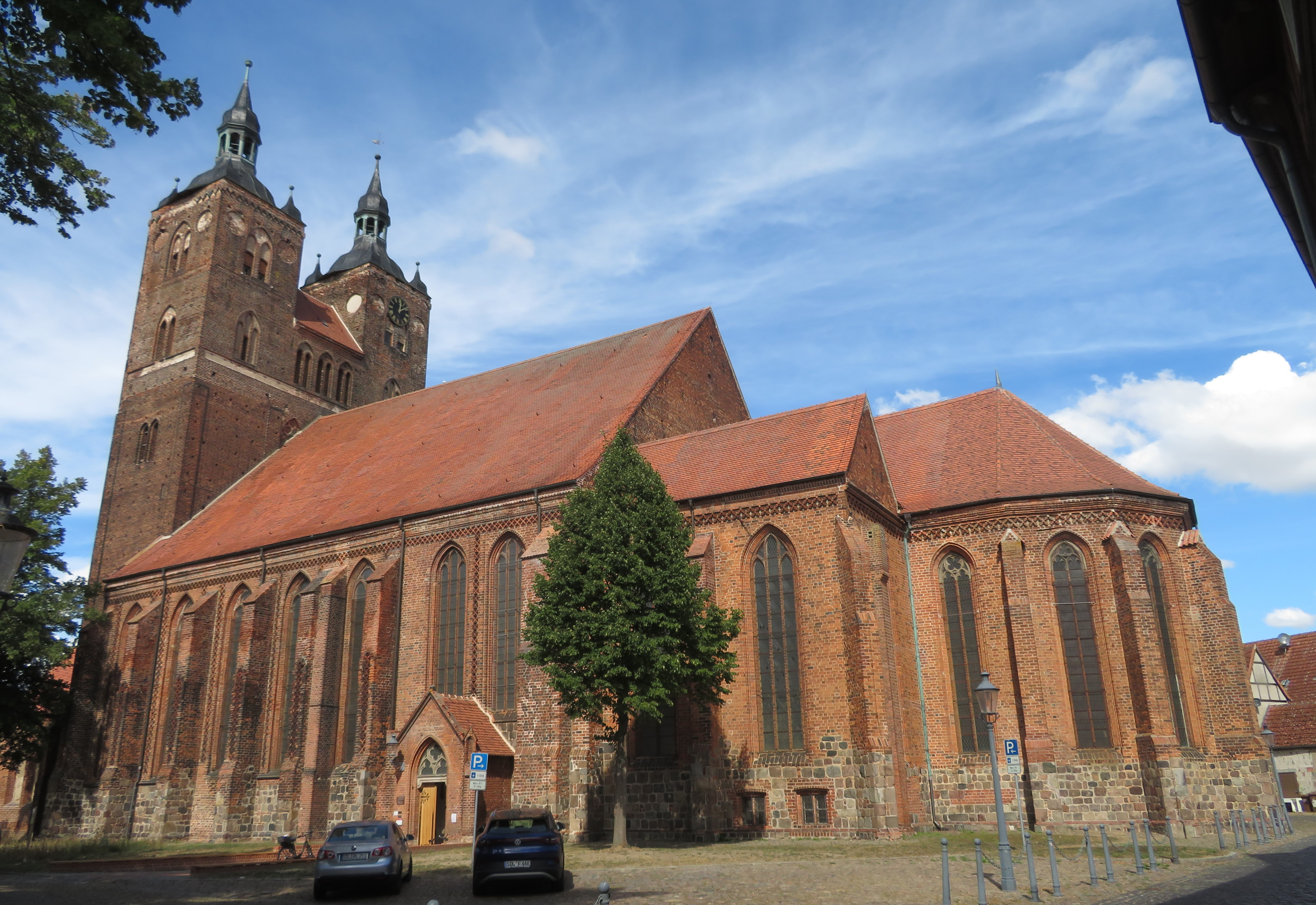
St. Petri Church

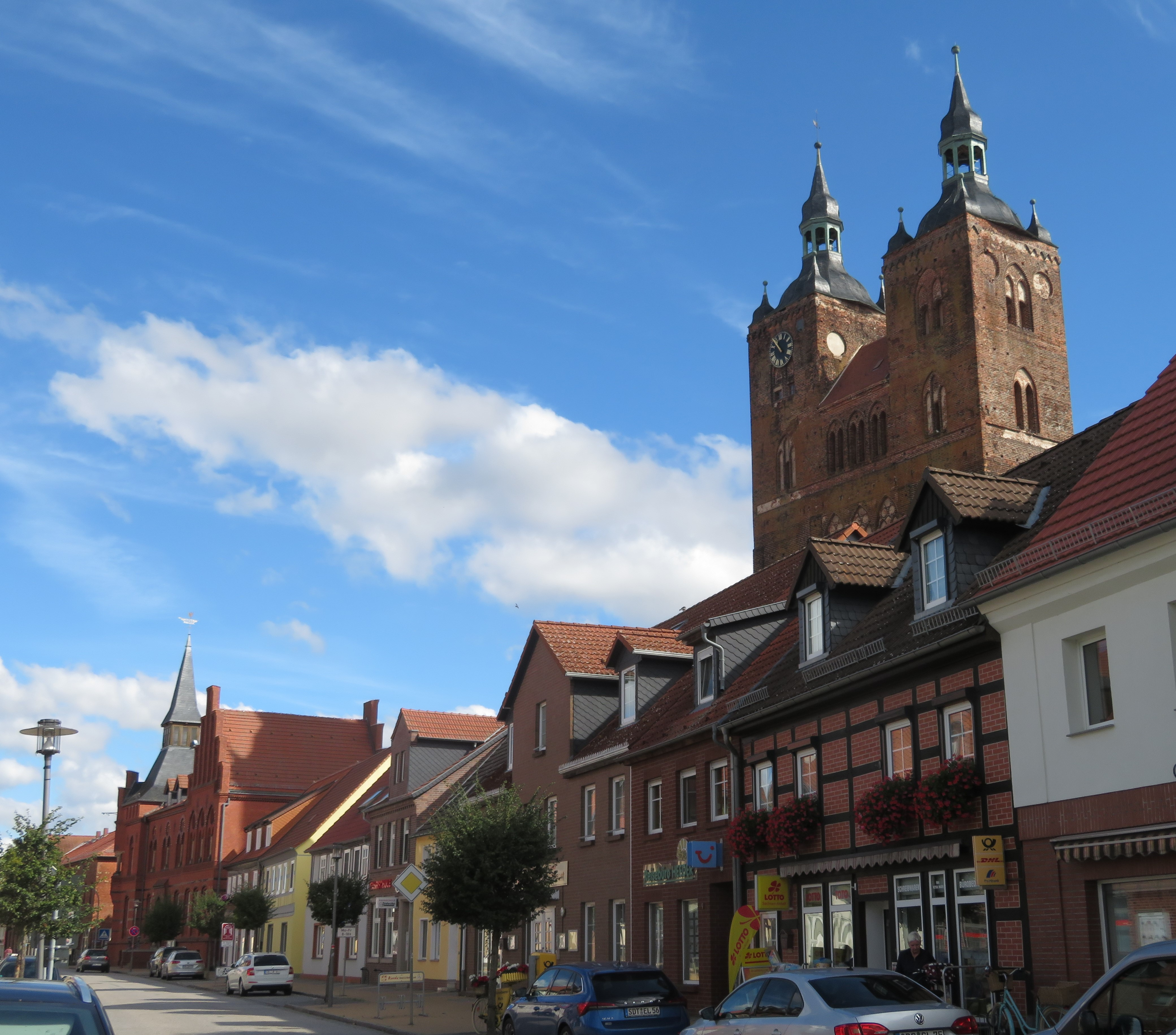
Main Street (Große Brüderstraße)

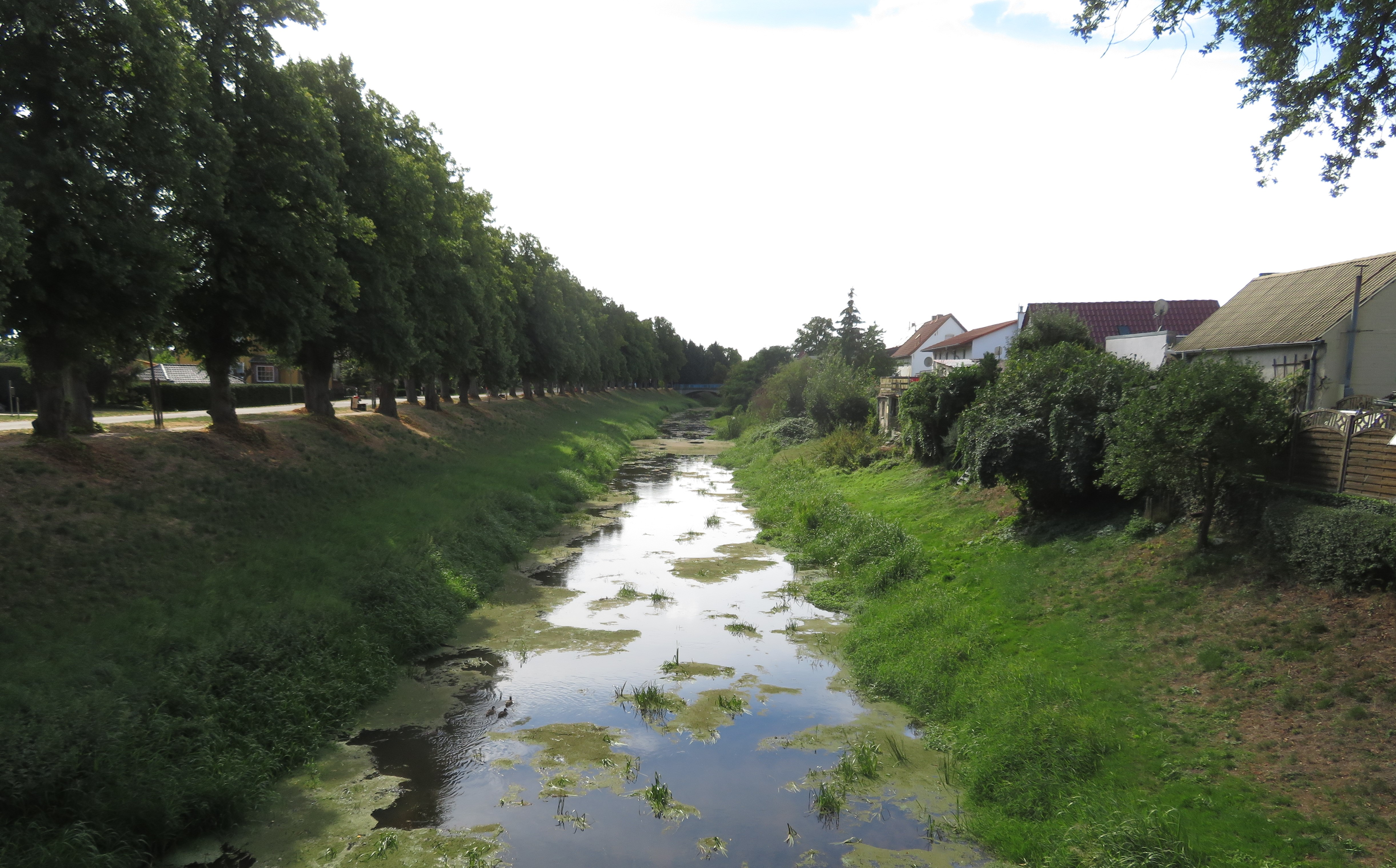
Ancient rampart and moat

== Notable people ==
- Johann Joachim Winckelmann (1717–1768), archaeologist and art historian, worked in Seehausen as a teacher from 1743 to 1748.
- Minna Nanitz, operatic mezzo-soprano, was born in Seehausen.
