= Steinfeld, Saxony-Anhalt =

Steinfeld
- Stadtteil of Bismark
- Interactive map of Steinfeld
- Location within Germany Location within Saxony-Anhalt
- Coordinates: 52°37′11″N 11°41′59″E
- Country: Germany
- State: Saxony-Anhalt
- District: Stendal
- Town: Bismark

Area
  - Total: 11.13 km^{2} (4.30 sq mi)
- Elevation: 49 m (161 ft)

Population (2006-12-31)
  - Total: 312
  - Density: 28.0/km^{2} (72.6/sq mi)
- Time zone: UTC+01:00 (CET)
  - Summer (DST): UTC+02:00 (CEST)
- Postal codes: 39599
- Dialling codes: 039324
- Vehicle registration: SDL
- Website: www.stadt-bismark.de

Steinfeld (German pronunciation: [ˈʃtaɪnˌfɛlt]) is a village and a former municipality in the district of Stendal, in Saxony-Anhalt, Germany. Since 1 January 2010, it is part of the town Bismark.

== Geography ==
The Altmark village Steinfeld is about twelve miles east of Bismark and ten kilometers west of the center Altmark Stendal. The nearby towns are Schernikau to the east and Kläden to the west. The 1113 km^{2} large local territory, which includes the village located two miles east Schönfeld heard lies at an average altitude of 46 meters. The surrounding hilly area belongs to Endmoränenbogen, located north of the Secantsgraben and upper lamp stretches towards Stendal. South of Steinfeld, extends a pine forest, a deciduous forest east. Through the village passes provincial road 15, which connects to Bismark and Stendal. Steinfeld is on the railway line Magdeburg - Uelzen, the train station is 1.7 km from the center of the town.
