= Stendal (district) =

Coordinates: 52°41′N 11°51′E

- District
- Flag Coat of arms
- Country: Germany
- State: Saxony-Anhalt
- Capital: Stendal

Government
  - District admin.: Patrick Puhlmann (SPD)

Area
  - Total: 2,424.3 km^{2} (936.0 sq mi)

Population (31 December 2024)
  - Total: 106,538
  - Density: 44/km^{2} (110/sq mi)
- Time zone: UTC+01:00 (CET)
  - Summer (DST): UTC+02:00 (CEST)
- Vehicle registration: SDL, HV, OBG
- Website: landkreis-stendal.de

Stendal (German pronunciation: [ˈʃtɛndaːl]) is a district (Landkreis) in the north-east of Saxony-Anhalt, Germany. Its neighbouring districts are (clockwise from the south): Jerichower Land, Börde, Altmarkkreis Salzwedel, Lüchow-Dannenberg in Lower Saxony, and the districts of Prignitz, Ostprignitz-Ruppin and Havelland in Brandenburg.

== History ==
In the administrative reform of 1994 the previous district of Stendal was merged with the districts of Osterburg and Havelberg.

== Geography ==
The district is located in the Altmark region. With an area of 2,424.3 km^{2} (936.0 sq mi), it is the largest district of Saxony-Anhalt. Its highest elevation is the 132.8 metre high Landsberg. The main rivers in the district are the Elbe and the Havel.

== Partnerships ==
In 1990, a friendship with the Russian Yartsevsky District was started, which grew into a partnership in 1996. In 1994, a partnership with the Lithuanian district Mažeikiai was started. Further partnerships exist with the Lippe district in North Rhine-Westphalia and the Swedish municipality Vårgårda, and with the towns Płock (Poland), Havířov (Czech Republic), Saldus (Latvia), Paide (Estonia) and Karlshamn (Sweden).

== Coat of arms ==
The red eagle in the left of the coat of arms is the symbol of Brandenburg, representing that historically the Altmark was part of Brandenburg. It also stands for the district Havelland. The golden trefoil with three oak leaves symbolizes the old district Stendal, and is taken from the coat of arms of the family Bismarck. The three golden diamonds on black ground come from the coat of arms of the dukes of Osterburg, representing the former district Osterburg.

== Towns and municipalities ==
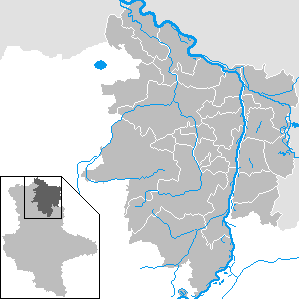
Clickable map of towns and municipalities in the district

The district of Stendal consists of the following subdivisions:

Free towns
1. Bismark
2. Havelberg
3. Osterburg
4. Stendal
5. Tangerhütte
6. Tangermünde

Verbandsgemeinden
1. Arneburg-Goldbeck; 1. Arneburg^{2}; 2. Eichstedt; 3. Goldbeck^{1}; 4. Hassel; 5. Hohenberg-Krusemark; 6. Iden; 7. Rochau; 8. Werben^{2}	2. Elbe-Havel-Land; 1. Kamern; 2. Klietz; 3. Sandau^{2}; 4. Schönhausen^{1}; 5. Schollene; 6. Wust-Fischbeck	3. Seehausen; 1. Aland; 2. Altmärkische Höhe; 3. Altmärkische Wische; 4. Seehausen^{1, 2}; 5. Zehrental
^{1}seat of the Verbandsgemeinde; ^{2}town
