= Stendal-Uchtetal =

Coordinates: 52°36′N 11°51′E

Stendal-Uchtetal was a Verwaltungsgemeinschaft ("collective municipality") in the district of Stendal, in Saxony-Anhalt, Germany. The seat of the Verwaltungsgemeinschaft was in Stendal. It was disbanded on 1 January 2010, when most member municipalities merged to form the new town of Stendal. Dahlen, Insel, and Vinzelberg were classified as separate municipalities.

The Verwaltungsgemeinschaft Stendal-Uchtetal consisted of the following municipalities:

1. Buchholz
2. Dahlen
3. Groß Schwechten
4. Heeren
5. Insel
6. Möringen
7. Nahrstedt
8. Staats
9. Stendal
10. Uchtspringe
11. Uenglingen
12. Vinzelberg
13. Volgfelde
14. Wittenmoor
