= Altmark – Jerichower Land =

Federal electoral district of Germany

Coordinates: 52°41′19″N 11°32′31″E

66 Altmark – Jerichower Land
- Electoral district for the Bundestag
- Altmark – Jerichower Land in 2025
- State: Saxony-Anhalt
- Population: 194,400 (2019)
- Electorate: 159,998 (2021)
- Major settlements: Stendal; Salzwedel; Burg bei Magdeburg
- Area: 6,275.6 km^{2}

Current electoral district
- Created: 1990
- Party: AfD
- Member: Thomas Korell
- Elected: 2025

Altmark – Jerichower Land is an electoral constituency (German: Wahlkreis) represented in the Bundestag. It elects one member via first-past-the-post voting. Under the current constituency numbering system, it is designated as constituency 66. It is located in northern Saxony-Anhalt, comprising the districts of Altmarkkreis Salzwedel, Jerichower Land, and Stendal.

Altmark – Jerichower Land was created for the inaugural 1990 federal election after German reunification. From 2021 to 2025, it was represented by Herbert Wollmann of the Social Democratic Party (SPD). Since 2025 it has been represented by Thomas Korell of the AfD.

== Geography ==
Altmark – Jerichower Land is located in northern Saxony-Anhalt. As of the 2025 federal election, it comprises the districts of Altmarkkreis Salzwedel, Jerichower Land, and Stendal.

== History ==
Altmark – Jerichower Land was created after German reunification in 1990 and known as Altmark. In the 1990 through 1998 elections, it was constituency 283 in the numbering system. In the 2002 and 2005 elections, it was number 66. In the 2009 election, it was number 67. Since the 2013 election, it has been number 66.

Originally, the constituency comprised the districts of Salzwedel, Stendal, Osterburg, Gardelegen, and Klötze. In the 2002 election, it was reconfigured to comprise the districts of Altmarkkreis Salzwedel and Stendal. Ahead of the 2025 election, it acquired the district of Jerichower Land.

Election	No.	Name	Borders
1990	283	Altmark	Salzwedel district; Stendal district; Osterburg district; Gardelegen district; Klötze district
1994	283	Altmark	Salzwedel district; Stendal district; Osterburg district; Gardelegen district; Klötze district
1998	283	Altmark	Salzwedel district; Stendal district; Osterburg district; Gardelegen district; Klötze district
2002	66	Altmark	Altmarkkreis Salzwedel district; Stendal district
2005	66	Altmark	Altmarkkreis Salzwedel district; Stendal district
2009	67	Altmark	Altmarkkreis Salzwedel district; Stendal district
2013	66	Altmark	Altmarkkreis Salzwedel district; Stendal district
2017	66	Altmark	Altmarkkreis Salzwedel district; Stendal district
2021	66	Altmark	Altmarkkreis Salzwedel district; Stendal district
2025	66	Altmark – Jerichower Land	Altmarkkreis Salzwedel district; Jerichower Land district; Stendal district

== Members ==
The constituency was first represented by Rudolf Karl Krause of the Christian Democratic Union (CDU), who served from 1990 to 1994. Reinhard Weis of the Social Democratic Party (SPD) was elected in 1994 and served until 2005, followed by Marko Mühlstein until 2009. In 2009, Katrin Kunert of The Left won the constituency and served a single term. Jörg Hellmuth of the CDU was elected in 2013, followed by Eckhard Gnodtke in 2017. Herbert Wollmann regained it for the SPD in 2021.

Election	Member	Party	%
1990	Rudolf Karl Krause	CDU	38.9
1994	Reinhard Weis	SPD	38.6
1998	Reinhard Weis	SPD	45.0
2002	Reinhard Weis	SPD	45.2
2005	Marko Mühlstein	SPD	33.2
2009	Katrin Kunert	LINKE	33.4
2013	Jörg Hellmuth	CDU	42.1
2017	Eckhard Gnodtke	CDU	32.6
2021	Herbert Wollmann	SPD	27.5
2025	Thomas Korell	AfD	39.2

== Election results ==
=== 2025 election ===
Federal election (2025): Altmark – Jerichower Land
Notes:	Blue background denotes the winner of the electorate vote. Pink background denotes a candidate elected from their party list. Yellow background denotes an electorate win by a list member, or other incumbent. A ✓ or ✗ denotes status of any incumbent, win or lose respectively.						
Party	Candidate	Votes	%	±%	Party votes	%	±%
AfD	Thomas Korell	69,054	39.2	▲19.2	66,177	37.4	▲18.2
CDU	Gerry Weber	38,817	22.0	▼1.2	34,163	19.3	▼2.2
SPD	✗ Herbert Wollmann	28,275	16.0	▼11.2	20,659	11.7	▼15.7
BSW					20,584	11.6	New
Left	Nadja Lüttich	22,147	12.6	▲2.6	18,648	10.5	▲1.2
FW	Andreas Tischmacher	7,010	4.0	▼0.3	2,844	1.6	▼1.0
FDP	Marcus Faber	6,046	3.4	▼4.6	5,369	3.0	▼5.7
Greens	Miriam Zeller	4,852	2.8	▼1.6	5,917	3.3	▼2.0
PARTEI					1,293	0.7	0.0
Volt					909	0.5	▲0.4
BD					459	0.3	New
MLPD					142	0.1	0.0
Informal votes		2,297			1,334		
Total valid votes		176,201			177,164		
Turnout		178,498	78.3	▲10.3			
AfD gain from SPD	Majority	30,237	17.2	N/A			

=== 2021 election ===
Federal election (2021): Altmark
Notes:	Blue background denotes the winner of the electorate vote. Pink background denotes a candidate elected from their party list. Yellow background denotes an electorate win by a list member, or other incumbent. A ✓ or ✗ denotes status of any incumbent, win or lose respectively.						
Party	Candidate	Votes	%	±%	Party votes	%	±%
SPD	Herbert Wollmann	29,599	27.5	▲8.4	29,537	27.4	▲10.4
CDU	Uwe Harms	23,433	21.8	▼10.8	22,567	20.9	▼11.8
AfD	Arno Bausemer	20,875	19.4	▲2.9	20,629	19.1	▲2.4
Left	Matthias Höhn	11,218	10.4	▼8.7	10,381	9.6	▼8.9
FDP	Marcus Faber	9,116	8.5	▲1.7	9,396	8.7	▲1.6
FW	Nils Krümmel	5,584	5.2	▲3.8	3,286	3.0	▲2.2
Greens	Gregor Laukert	4,674	4.3	▲0.9	5,834	5.4	▲2.1
dieBasis	Martin Schwab	2,132	2.0		1,985	1.8	
Tierschutzpartei					1,100	1.0	
Independent	Heiko Janowski	880	0.8				
Tierschutzallianz					818	0.8	▼0.3
PARTEI					725	0.7	▼0.2
Gartenpartei					510	0.5	0.0
Pirates					308	0.3	
NPD					205	0.2	▼0.4
Volt					140	0.1	
Humanists					99	0.1	
du.					91	0.1	
MLPD					75	0.1	0.0
Independent	Danny Bibiella	69	0.1				
ÖDP					58	0.1	
Informal votes		1,301			1,137		
Total valid votes		107,580			107,744		
Turnout		108,881	68.1	▲0.9			
SPD gain from CDU	Majority	6,166	5.7				

=== 2017 election ===
Federal election (2017): Altmark
Notes:	Blue background denotes the winner of the electorate vote. Pink background denotes a candidate elected from their party list. Yellow background denotes an electorate win by a list member, or other incumbent. A ✓ or ✗ denotes status of any incumbent, win or lose respectively.						
Party	Candidate	Votes	%	±%	Party votes	%	±%
CDU	Eckhard Gnodtke	35,644	32.6	▼9.6	36,022	32.8	▼9.3
Left	Matthias Höhn	20,973	19.2	▼11.2	20,346	18.5	▼6.1
SPD	Maria Kermer	20,900	19.1	▲1.5	18,721	17.0	▼2.0
AfD	Matthias Büttner	18,031	16.5		18,419	16.8	▲13.2
FDP	Marcus Faber	7,388	6.7	▲5.3	7,838	7.1	▲5.0
Greens	Mirko Wolff	3,738	3.4	▲0.6	3,648	3.3	0.0
FW	Elke du Bois	1,567	1.4	▲0.6	888	0.8	▲0.1
Tierschutzallianz					1,218	1.1	
PARTEI					970	0.9	
NPD					662	0.6	▼1.5
Independent	Renne	654	0.6				
Independent	Schmidt	560	0.5				
MG					467	0.4	
BGE					304	0.3	
DiB					242	0.2	
MLPD					118	0.1	0.0
Informal votes		1,738			1,330		
Total valid votes		109,455			109,863		
Turnout		111,193	67.1	▲4.5			
CDU hold	Majority	14,671	13.4	▲1.6			

=== 2013 election ===
Federal election (2013): Altmark
Notes:	Blue background denotes the winner of the electorate vote. Pink background denotes a candidate elected from their party list. Yellow background denotes an electorate win by a list member, or other incumbent. A ✓ or ✗ denotes status of any incumbent, win or lose respectively.						
Party	Candidate	Votes	%	±%	Party votes	%	±%
CDU	Jörg Hellmuth	44,686	42.1	▲10.9	44,655	42.0	▲11.8
Left	✗ Katrin Kunert	32,164	30.3	▼3.1	26,180	24.6	▼8.9
SPD	Marina Kermer	18,616	17.6	▼2.4	20,196	19.0	▲1.3
AfD					3,826	3.6	
Greens	Christian Franke	2,998	2.8	▼0.5	3,542	3.3	▼1.4
NPD	Heiko Krause	2,613	2.5	▲0.2	2,227	2.1	0.0
Pirates	René Schernikau	2,541	2.4		1,997	1.9	▼0.3
FDP	Marcus Faber	1,489	1.4	▼4.5	2,278	2.1	▼6.7
FW	Elke du Bois	931	0.9		722	0.7	
PRO					306	0.3	
ÖDP					147	0.1	
MLPD					141	0.1	▼0.1
Informal votes		1,857			1,678		
Total valid votes		106,038			106,217		
Turnout		107,895	62.6	▲0.7			
CDU gain from Left	Majority	12,522	11.8				

=== 2009 election ===
Federal election (2009): Altmark
Notes:	Blue background denotes the winner of the electorate vote. Pink background denotes a candidate elected from their party list. Yellow background denotes an electorate win by a list member, or other incumbent. A ✓ or ✗ denotes status of any incumbent, win or lose respectively.						
Party	Candidate	Votes	%	±%	Party votes	%	±%
Left	Katrin Kunert	36,910	33.4	▲6.1	37,034	33.6	▲6.1
CDU	Hans-Heinrich Jordan	34,501	31.2	▲0.1	33,330	30.2	▲3.8
SPD	Marko Mühlstein	22,070	20.0	▼13.3	19,516	17.7	▼15.3
FDP	Gabriele Hauptstein	6,558	5.9	▲2.5	9,725	8.8	▲2.5
Greens	Eduard Stapel	3,725	3.4	▲1.1	5,212	4.7	▲1.3
Independent	Andreas Siegmund	3,672	3.3				
NPD	Andy Knape	2,461	2.2	0.0	2,318	2.1	▼0.1
Pirates					2,422	2.2	
DVU					449	0.4	
Independent	Wiltrud Dettmer	274	0.2				
Independent	Harald Bresch	257	0.2				
MLPD					232	0.2	▼0.1
Informal votes		2,552			2,742		
Total valid votes		110,428			110,238		
Turnout		112,980	61.8	▼9.8			
Left gain from SPD	Majority	2,409	2.2				

=== 2005 election ===
Federal election (2005):Altmark – Jerichower Land
Notes:	Blue background denotes the winner of the electorate vote. Pink background denotes a candidate elected from their party list. Yellow background denotes an electorate win by a list member, or other incumbent. A ✓ or ✗ denotes status of any incumbent, win or lose respectively.						
Party	Candidate	Votes	%	±%	Party votes	%	±%
SPD	Marko Mühlstein	44,012	33.2	▼11.9	43M852	33.0	▼12.6
CDU	Hans-Heinrich Jordan	41,197	31.1	▲0.4	35,087	26.4	▼1.5
Left	Katrin Kunert	36,157	27.3	▲12.6	36,503	27.5	▲13.6
FDP	Andreas=Otto Gharibian	4,515	3.4	▼2.3	8,372	6.3	▼0.8
NPD	Rene Schieske	2,977	2.2		2,902	2.2	▲1.3
Greens	Eduard Stapel	2,975	2.2	▲0.2	4,584	3.5	▲0.3
Schill	Klaus Ahif	563	0.4		259	0.2	
Pro German Center – Pro D-Mark Initiative					465	0.4	
MLPD					348	0.3	
REP					340	0.3	
Informal votes		2,810			2,494		
Total valid votes		132,396			132,712		
Turnout		135,206	71.7	▲2.8			
SPD hold	Majority	2,815	2.1				
