= Arno Bausemer =

German politician (born 1982)

Arno Bausemer MEP
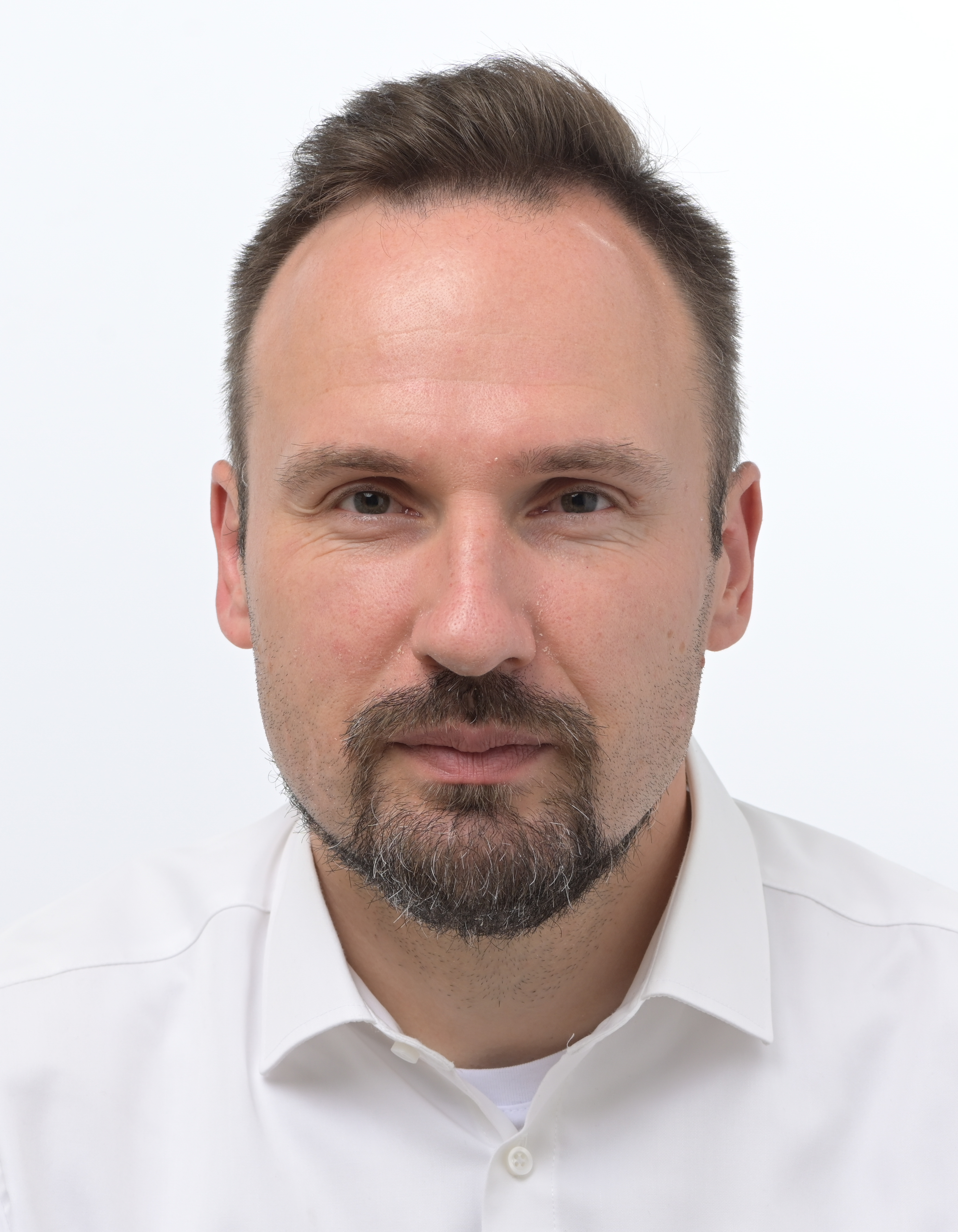

Member of the European Parliament
- Incumbent
- Assumed office 16 July 2024
- Constituency: Germany

Personal details
- Born: 2 December 1982 (age 43) Havelberg, Germany
- Party: Alternative for Germany (2016–present); Free Democratic Party (until 2016)
- Other political affiliations: Europe of Sovereign Nations
- Education: Leipzig University

Arno Bausemer (born 2 December 1982) is a German politician of Alternative for Germany who was elected member of the European Parliament in 2024.

== Early life and career ==
Bausemer was born in Havelberg in 1982. He grew up in Hohengöhren and went to school in Schönhausen and Tangermünde, and started studying journalism and political science at Leipzig University. He stopped his studies prematurely.

In 2009 he became a lay judge at the Magdeburg Administrative Court, appearing at 3–4 hearings per year.

While in school he interned at Lok Stendal, and was later responsible for sports broadcasts at Offener Kanal Stendal for 15 years. He worked at Mitteldeutscher Rundfunk in Leipzig for nine months in 2010 yet did not finish his internship with a qualification.

Arno Bausemer worked as an actor in reality-tv shows. He additionally worked as statist in movies by Til Schweiger.

== Political career ==
Bausemer's father was a member of the Kreistag, of the Landkreis Stendal, representing the FDP, leading him to join the party. Bausemer junior worked with the FDP for ten years, and was the party's district treasurer and group chairman in Elbe-Havel-Land.

Bausemer was a critic of the FDP district chairman Marcus Faber, and began to turn away from FDP following its approval of the Greek bailout, ultimately leaving it due to the Stendal electoral fraud case. He announced his departure in January 2016, expressing disappointment that the fraud case, as well as the party's 2013 constituency result, had not led to a change in the local leadership of the FDP, and criticizing the federal party's policies on Greece and refugees. By resigning from the FDP, he pre-empted proceedings that had already been initiated to expel him from the party.

Having been a skeptic of CDU chancellor Angela Merkel's border policies in 2015, he looked for an alternative party. He joined Alternative for Germany in February 2016, and in the same year became a member of its district board and its candidate for mayor of Elbe-Havel-Land, as well as a member of its executive committee in Saxony-Anhalt.

In the spring of 2017, Bausemer became the first leader of the Young Alternative in Stendal upon its founding, and he began working as chief of staff to Oliver Kirchner in November 2017. He became leader of the AfD in the city council of Stendal, and in 2019 was elected to the Kreistag and was the party's candidate for Landrat, but failed.

Bausemer wanted to became mayor of Stendal in 2022, but failed. He also wanted to became member of Bundestag for Altmark – Jerichower Land in 2021 federal election, but failed.

== Curriculum vitae affair ==
In the summer of 2023 Bausemer and his party associate Mary Khan-Hohloch gained notoriety throughout Germany due to inconsistencies in their curriculum vitaes. Bausemer used his curriculum vitae to reason his place on the list of the AFD-party for the European Parliament elections.

Bausemer falsely stated that he had been the managing director of a medium-sized agricultural business since 2012. In fact, it is not possible to be the managing director of a sole proprietorship in Germany. The sole proprietorship belonged to his mother. In addition, his inconsistency with regard to the receipt of subsidies and criticism of these was heavily criticized.

Bausemer also claimed to have received a scholarship by the Friedrich Naumann Foundation, which is close to the FDP, due to being highly gifted. In fact there is no such scholarship as confirmed by the foundation and it is not proven that he is highly gifted.

Another subject of criticism of his curriculum vitae was the claim that he had a professional qualification as journalist. He stated that he had - for the purpose of achieving this professional qualification - completed his internship at Mitteldeutscher Rundfunk, which is also not true. He did not answer any explicit questions regarding this topic to journalists of t-online explicitly. Thus, Bausemer has, contrary to his claims, no proven professional qualification up to this day (2024-08-13).

As a result of this affair, some party members have called for Bausemer to withdraw from the European Parliament election. Additionally they called the party executive committee of the AFD for an expulsion of Bausemer from the party and a new determination of the AFD list for the election. Consequently, Bausemer was stripped of his party offices at local and state level, yet was able to stand in the EU elections.
