= Jochen Borchert =

German politician and member of the CDU

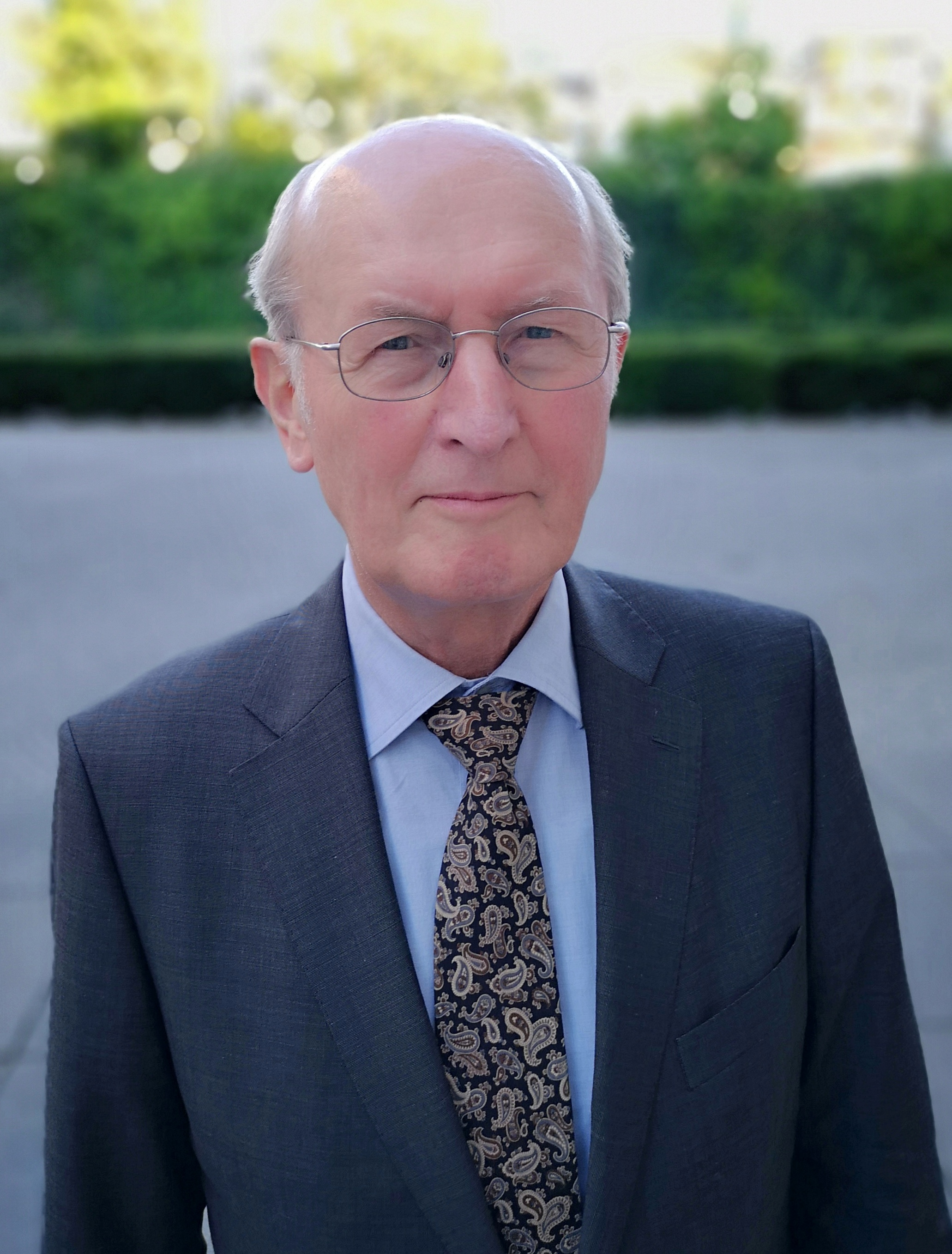
- Borchert in 2018

Minister of Food and Agriculture
- In office 21. January 1993 – 26. Oktober 1998
- Chancellor: Helmut Kohl
- Preceded by: Ignaz Kiechle
- Succeeded by: Karl-Heinz Funke

Member of the Bundestag
- In office 4 November 1980 – 27 October 2009

Personal details
- Born: 25 April 1940 (age 85) Nahrstedt
- Party: CDU

Jochen Borchert (born 25 April 1940 in Nahrstedt, Stendal) is a German politician and member of the CDU. He was minister of Food, Agriculture and Consumer Protection in Chancellor Helmut Kohl's cabinet from 1993 to 1998. From 1980 to 2009 he was a member of the Bundestag.
