= Reinhard Weis =

German politician (born 1949)

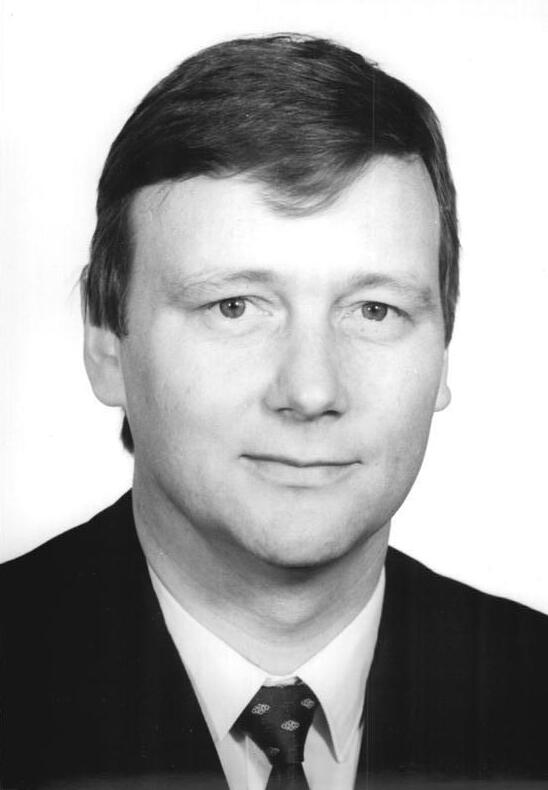
- Reinhard Weis in 1990

Member of the Bundestag
- In office 3 October 1990 – 18 October 2005
- Succeeded by: Marko Mühlstein
- Constituency: Altmark (1994–2005); Saxony-Anhalt (1990–1994)

Member of the Volkskammer
- In office 18 March 1990 – 2 October 1990

Personal details
- Born: 12 March 1949 (age 77) Tangermünde, Saxony-Anhalt, East Germany
- Party: Social Democratic Party
- Children: 2
- Education: Ilmenau University of Technology
- Occupation: Electrical engineer, politician

Reinhard Weis (born 12 March 1949) is a German politician of the Social Democratic Party (SPD). Trained as an electrical engineer, he entered politics during the collapse of the East German state in 1989 and sat in the last, freely elected Volkskammer of the German Democratic Republic in 1990. He was a member of the Bundestag from reunification in October 1990 until 2005, representing the Altmark constituency in Saxony-Anhalt by direct mandate from 1994 onwards.

== Early life and career ==
Weis was born in Tangermünde in the Altmark region of what became the German Democratic Republic. He is Roman Catholic and is married with two children.

He completed his Abitur together with vocational training as an electrical fitter at Merkers in the Rhön, and then studied electrical engineering at the Ilmenau University of Technology, graduating as a Diplom-Ingenieur. He worked in the East German power industry as a power station manager and chief energy engineer. Immediately before entering politics he was employed as an energy engineer at the condensed milk works at Stendal-Genthin.

== Political career ==
=== Revolution of 1989 and the Volkskammer ===
Weis became politically active during the 1980s through contacts with East German environmental groups. He joined the newly founded Social Democratic Party in the GDR (SDP) in November 1989 and was among the founders of its local branch in Stendal the following month, becoming its first chairman.

Standing on his party's district list, Weis was elected to the Volkskammer on 18 March 1990, one of four deputies from the Stendal area in the last East German parliament. He served until the chamber was dissolved on 2 October 1990. Reflecting on the period twenty-five years later, he described the political working methods of 1990 as completely new to him and said he sometimes struggled to believe he had taken part in the process at all.

=== Member of the Bundestag ===
On 3 October 1990 Weis was among the 144 Volkskammer deputies delegated to the Bundestag for the remainder of the eleventh legislative term. At the December 1990 federal election he was returned on the SPD state list for Saxony-Anhalt.

From the 1994 election onwards Weis held the Altmark constituency by direct mandate, taking 38.6 per cent of the constituency vote in 1994, 45.0 per cent in 1998 and 45.2 per cent in 2002. During the thirteenth legislative term he was a full member of the Committee on Education, Science, Research, Technology and Technology Assessment and a deputy member of the Committee on Transport.

Transport and construction policy became his principal field. From October 2002 to October 2004 he was spokesman for the SPD parliamentary group's working group on transport, building and housing, and he sat on the parliamentary group's executive committee from November 2002 to November 2004. He was a member of the Committee on Transport, Building and Housing from 2002, a deputy member of the Budget Committee, and a deputy member of the Joint Committee under Article 53a of the Basic Law from November 2002.

Weis did not stand again at the 2005 federal election, leaving parliament after five legislative terms. He was succeeded in the constituency by his party colleague Marko Mühlstein.

=== Later activity ===
After leaving the Bundestag, Weis again took over the chairmanship of the Stendal SPD branch in 2005. He stood as the SPD candidate in the Stendal mayoral election of February 2008 and was defeated, taking 18.1 per cent of the vote.

In late 2012 he announced that he would not seek another term as local branch chairman, citing a wish to hand over to a younger generation and the number of voluntary offices he had taken on since leaving parliament, among them the chairmanship of his Catholic parish council. After the sole declared successor withdrew, Weis unexpectedly stood again and was re-elected chairman in February 2013 with 23 votes and one abstention.

== Electoral history ==
Election	Constituency	Party	Constituency vote	Result
1994	Altmark	SPD	38.6%	Elected
1998	Altmark	SPD	45.0%	Elected
2002	Altmark	SPD	45.2%	Elected
