= Gnodtke =

Gnodtke is a surname. Notable people with the surname include:

- Carl Gnodtke (1936–2000), American politician
- Eckhard Gnodtke (born 1958), German politician
