= Thomas Korell =

German politician (born 1983)

Member of the Bundestag
- Incumbent
- Assumed office 25 March 2025
- Preceded by: Herbert Wollmann
- Constituency: Altmark – Jerichower Land

Member of the Landtag of Saxony-Anhalt
- In office 6 July 2021 – 1 April 2025
- Succeeded by: Mathias Knispel

Personal details
- Born: 1983 (age 42–43) Salzwedel
- Party: Alternative for Germany

Thomas Korell (born 29 July 1983) is a German politician serving as a member of the Bundestag since 2025. From 2021 to 2025, he was a member of the Landtag of Saxony-Anhalt.
