= Herbert Wollmann =

German politician

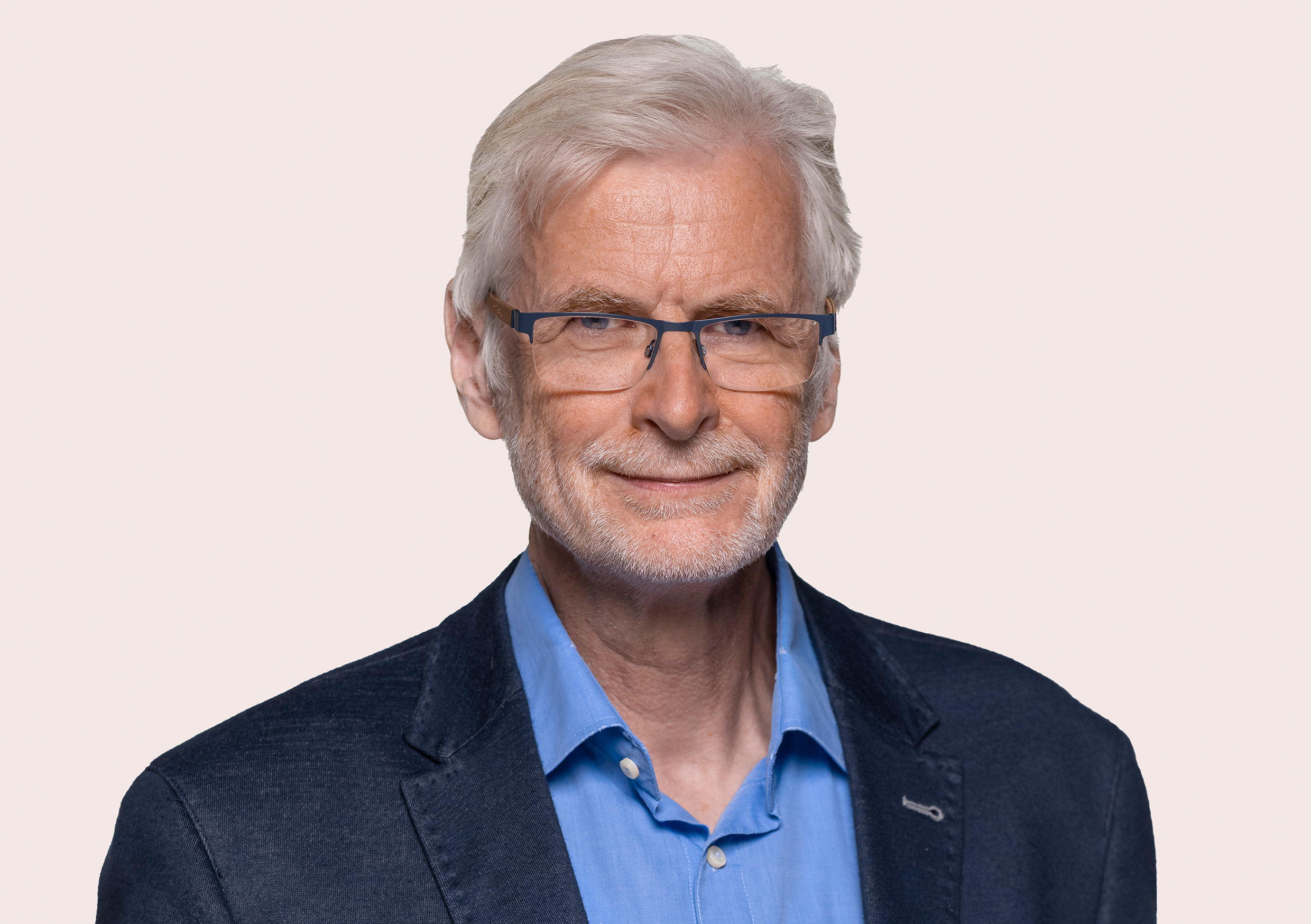

Member of the Bundestag
- In office 2021–2025

Personal details
- Born: 14 January 1951 (age 75) Berlin, Germany
- Citizenship: German
- Party: Social Democratic Party (SPD)

Herbert Wollmann (born 14 January 1951) is a German physician and politician of the Social Democratic Party (SPD) who served as a member of the Bundestag from 2021 to 2025.

== Early life and education ==
Wollmann was born 1951 in Berlin.

== Political career ==
Wollmann became a member of the Bundestag in 2021, representing the Altmark district. He has since been serving on the Health Committee and the Sports Committee. In February 2025, Wollmann lost his seat in Bundestag for district Altmark – Jerichower Land against Thomas Korell.
