= Katrin Kunert =

German politician

Katrin Kunert is a German politician of the Left Party. After working in regional politics, she was a member of the Bundestag from 2005 to 2017, effectively by winning a mandate in the 16th, 17th and 18th election.

== Life ==
Kunert was born on 6 April 1964 in Wolmirstedt in the German Democratic Republic (East Germany). After completing the Polytechnic Secondary School, she trained as a cattle breeder from 1980 to 1982 and then completed a degree in engineering for animal production in Stadtroda.

From 1986 to 1990, Kunert was head of the youth travel agency Jugendtourist in Osterburg before working full-time as the deputy district chairwoman of the PDS in Osterburg. Kunert was an employee of Helga Paschke, member of the state parliament of Saxony-Anhalt until 2005, when she was elected into the Bundestag.

== Political Work ==
Kunert joined the Socialist Unity Party (SED) and remained a member, when the SED was succeeded by the Party of Democratic Socialism (PDS), which itself later became the Left Party.

In the 1990s, Kunert was a member of multiple regional governments and party executive boards, such as:

- The district governments of Osterburg and Stendal
- The city council of Stendal
- The executive board of the PDS of Saxony-Anhalt
- The executive board of the PDS of the Osterburg District

From 2003 to 2006, she was a member of the executive board of the nationwide Party of Democratic Socialism (PDS). (Note: From 2005 until 2007 when it was succeeded by today's Left Party, the Party of Democratic Socialism (PDS) was officially called Linkspartei.PDS)

In 2005, Kunert was elected to the Bundestag by being on her party's State List. In 2009, she won a seat by winning the Altmark – Jerichower Land electoral district with 33.4% of the votes. She ran again for that constituency in 2013 but scored second place, behind Körg Hellmuth of the CDU. Nevertheless, she got a seat.

During her time in the Bundestag, Kunert was a member of the Sports Committee and the Defense Committee.

== Private life ==
She is not religious and has one son from her marriage.
