= Schönhausen =

- Municipality
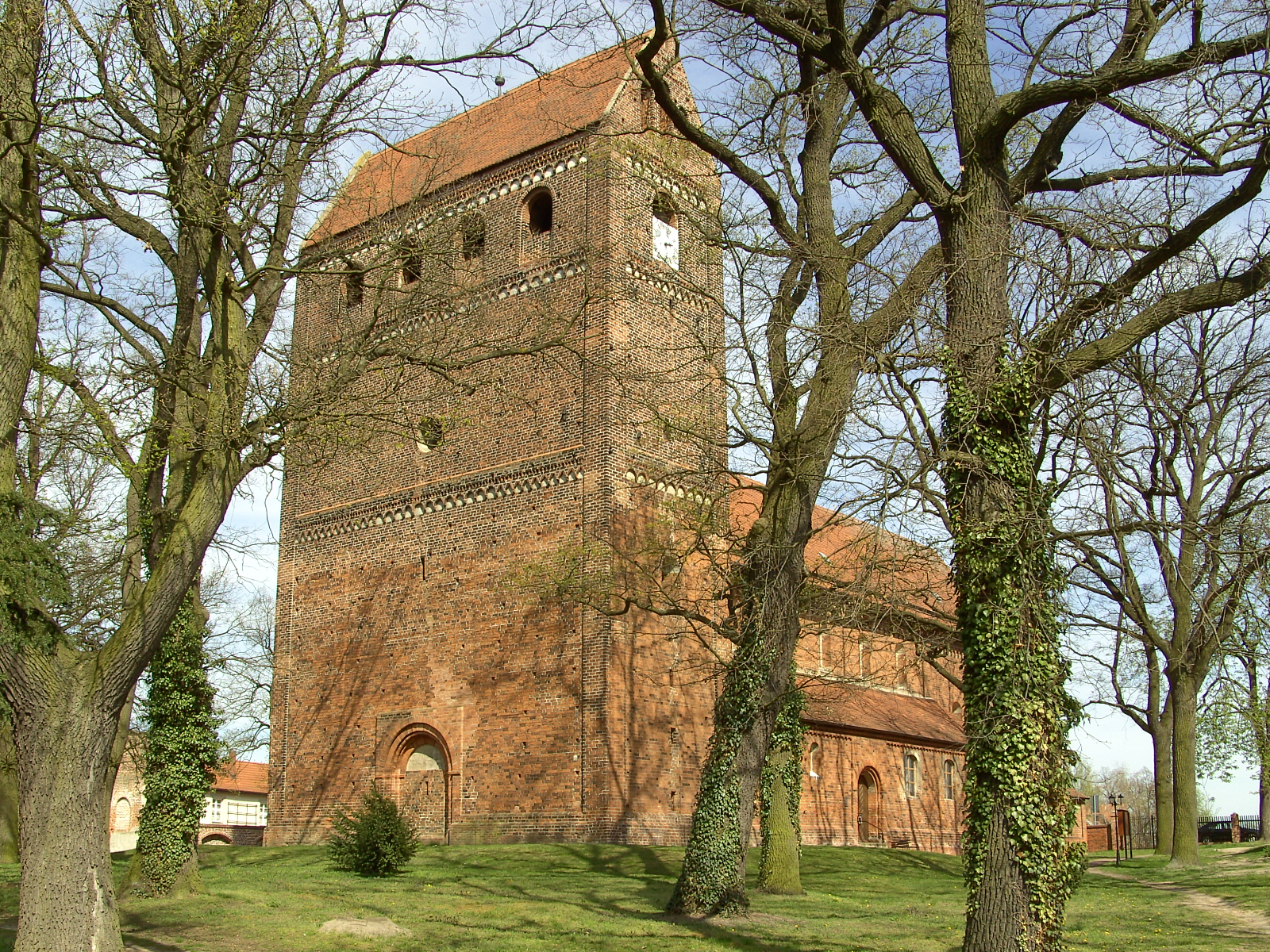
- Parish church

- Coat of arms

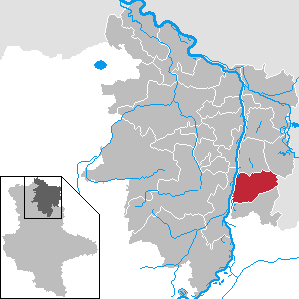
- Location of Schönhausen within Stendal district
- Interactive map of Schönhausen
- Location within Germany Location within Saxony-Anhalt
- Coordinates: 52°34′43″N 12°2′23″E
- Country: Germany
- State: Saxony-Anhalt
- District: Stendal
- Municipal assoc.: Elbe-Havel-Land

Government
  - Mayor (2024–31): Maik Mund

Area
  - Total: 74.09 km^{2} (28.61 sq mi)
- Elevation: 34 m (112 ft)

Population (2025-12-31)
  - Total: 2,077
  - Density: 28.03/km^{2} (72.61/sq mi)
- Time zone: UTC+01:00 (CET)
  - Summer (DST): UTC+02:00 (CEST)
- Postal codes: 39524
- Dialling codes: 039323
- Vehicle registration: SDL
- Website: www.schönhausen-elbe.com

Schönhausen (German pronunciation: [ʃøːnˈhaʊzn̩]; Low German: Schöönhusen) is a municipality in the district of Stendal in Saxony-Anhalt in Germany. It is the seat of the Verbandsgemeinde ("collective municipality") Elbe-Havel-Land.

== Geography ==
The village is situated on a terminal moraine, stretching along the eastern bank of the Elbe River. It is located about 70 km (43 mi) north of the state capital of Magdeburg, halfway between Stendal in the west and Rathenow in the east. Since 1 January 2010, Schönhausen includes the former municipality of Hohengöhren.

Schönhausen station is a stop on the Berlin–Lehrte railway line, served by Regionalbahn trains. The parallel Hanover–Berlin high-speed railway runs through the municipality without stopping.

== History ==
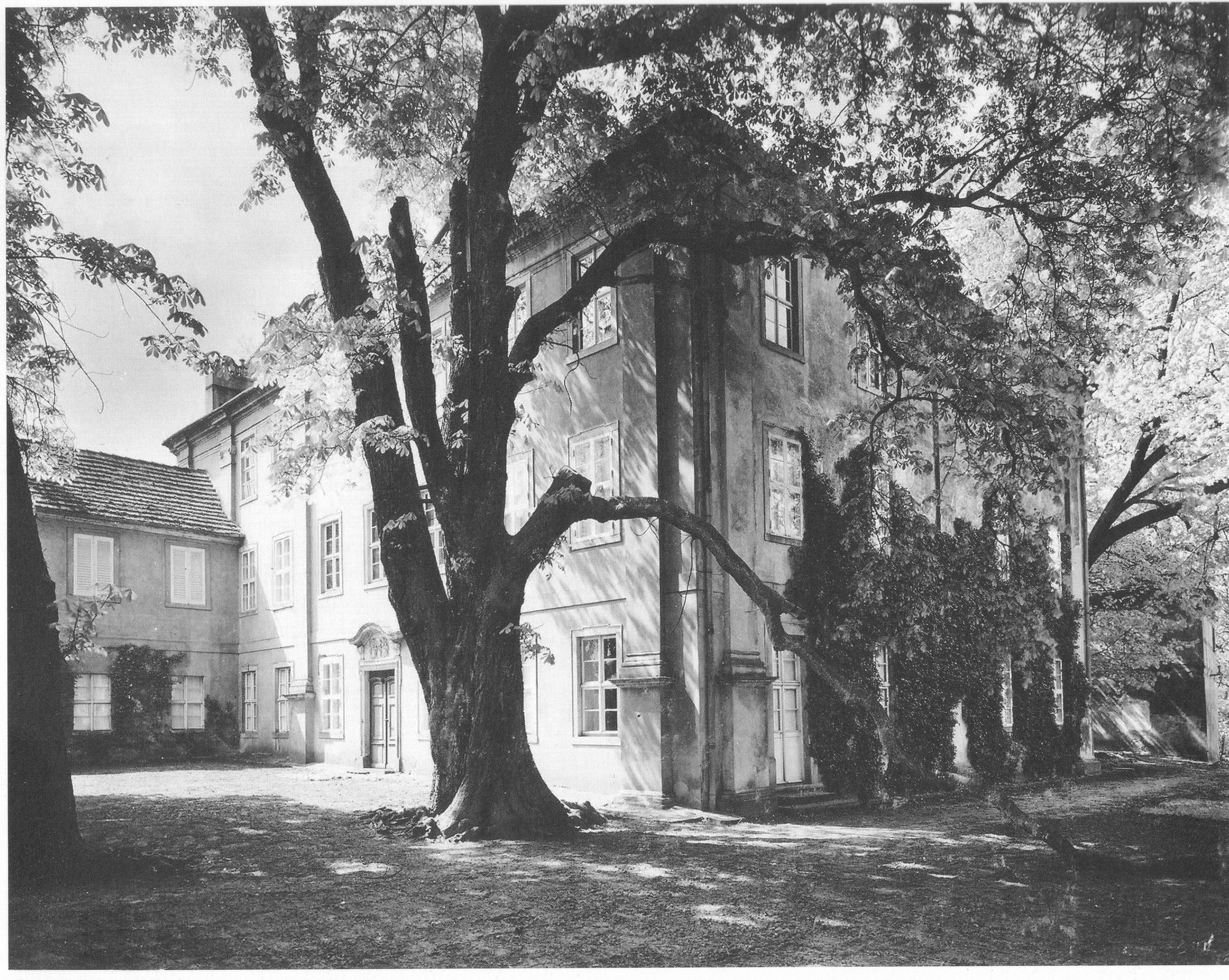
Bismarck's birthplace, 1921

Schönhausen was founded by the Bishops of Havelberg, who had the Romanesque brick church with its prominent westwork erected in 1212. After the Protestant Reformation, the Schönhausen estate was secularized by the Electors of Brandenburg.

In 1562, the administrator of Havelberg, Joachim III Frederick of Brandenburg, ceded the Schönhausen estates to the Bismarck family from Stendal, who had to swap it against Burgstall in the Altmark. The village was devastated by Swedish troops during the Thirty Years' War. In 1680, it became part of the Brandenburgian Duchy of Magdeburg, a constituent land of the Kingdom of Prussia from 1701.

The Bismarcks built two Baroque residences, the castles of Schönhausen I (about 1700) and Schönhausen II (from 1729), both with extended gardens. Both manors belonged to different branches of the family. On 1 April 1815, the later German chancellor Otto von Bismarck was born at Schönhausen I; he nevertheless grew up at his family's estate in Kniephof, Pomerania. He inherited the Schönhausen I manor upon the death of his father in 1845; 40 years later, the Chancellor also received Schönhausen II as a present "by the German nation" on the occasion of his 70th birthday, for which purpose it had been bought by the German government in 1885, having been sold previously in 1830 by a different family branch.

After World War II, Schönhausen became part of the Soviet occupation zone and the Bismarcks were deprived of their property by the Soviet Military Administration in 1945. The Communist East German government had the manor of Schönhausen I demolished in 1958, labeling it a symbol of Prussian Junkers and militarism. In 1998, a Bismarck museum was established in a preserved side wing. The manor of Schönhausen II, previously used as Bismarck Museum, became a school in the GDR era; since 2012 it is used as a community center with a registry office, event hall, club rooms, etc.

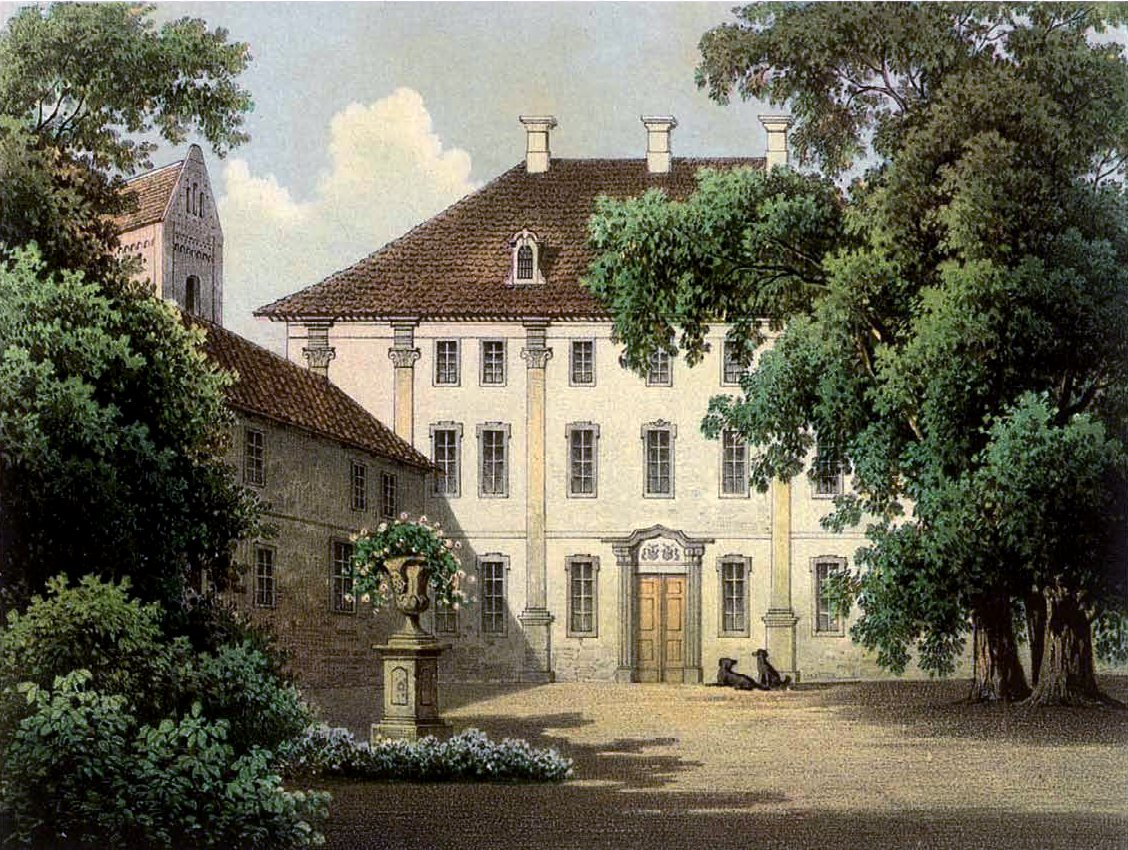
Schönhausen I manor, birthplace and parental home of Otto von Bismarck

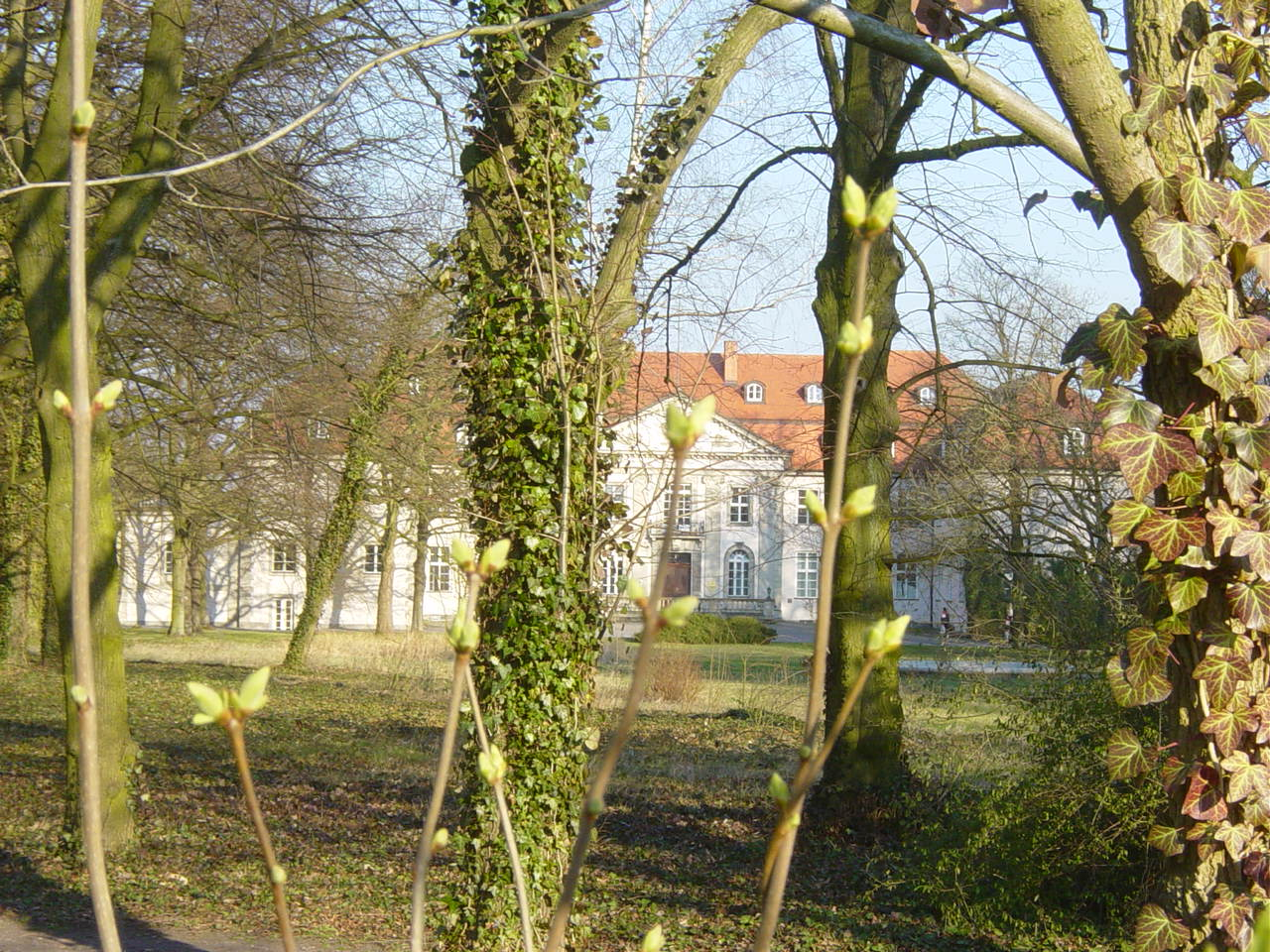
Schönhausen II manor

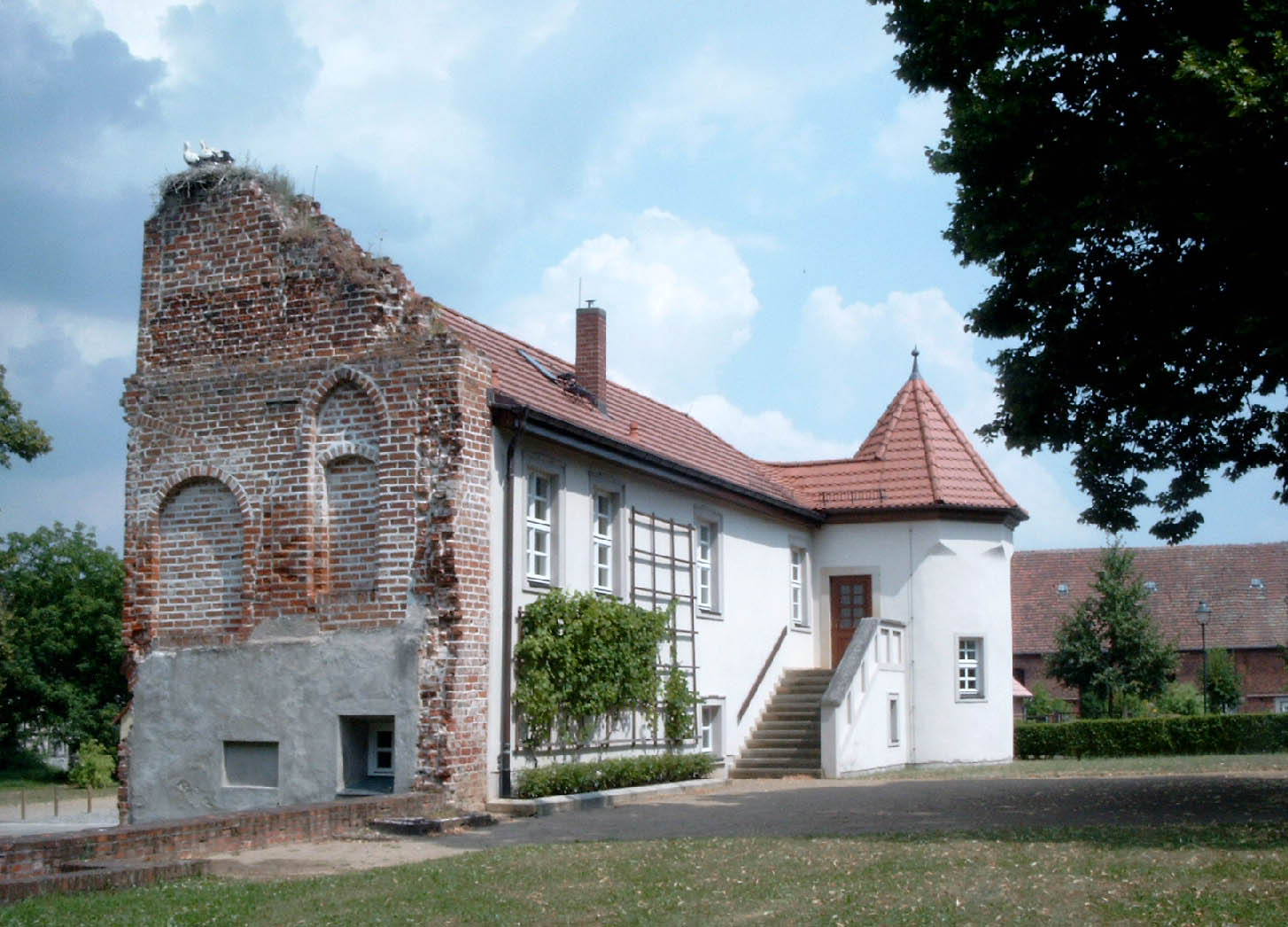
Bismarck museum

== Twin town ==
Schönhausen is twinned with:

- Kirchlinteln, Germany

== Notable people ==
- Otto von Bismarck (1815–1898), first Chancellor of Germany
- Otto Christian Archibald von Bismarck (1897–1975), politician and diplomat
- Annett Louisan (born 1977 in Havelberg), singer, grew up in Schönhausen.

== See also ==
- Romanesque Road
