= St. Nicholas Church, Stendal =

Gothic church

Coordinates: 52°36′02″N 11°51′37″E

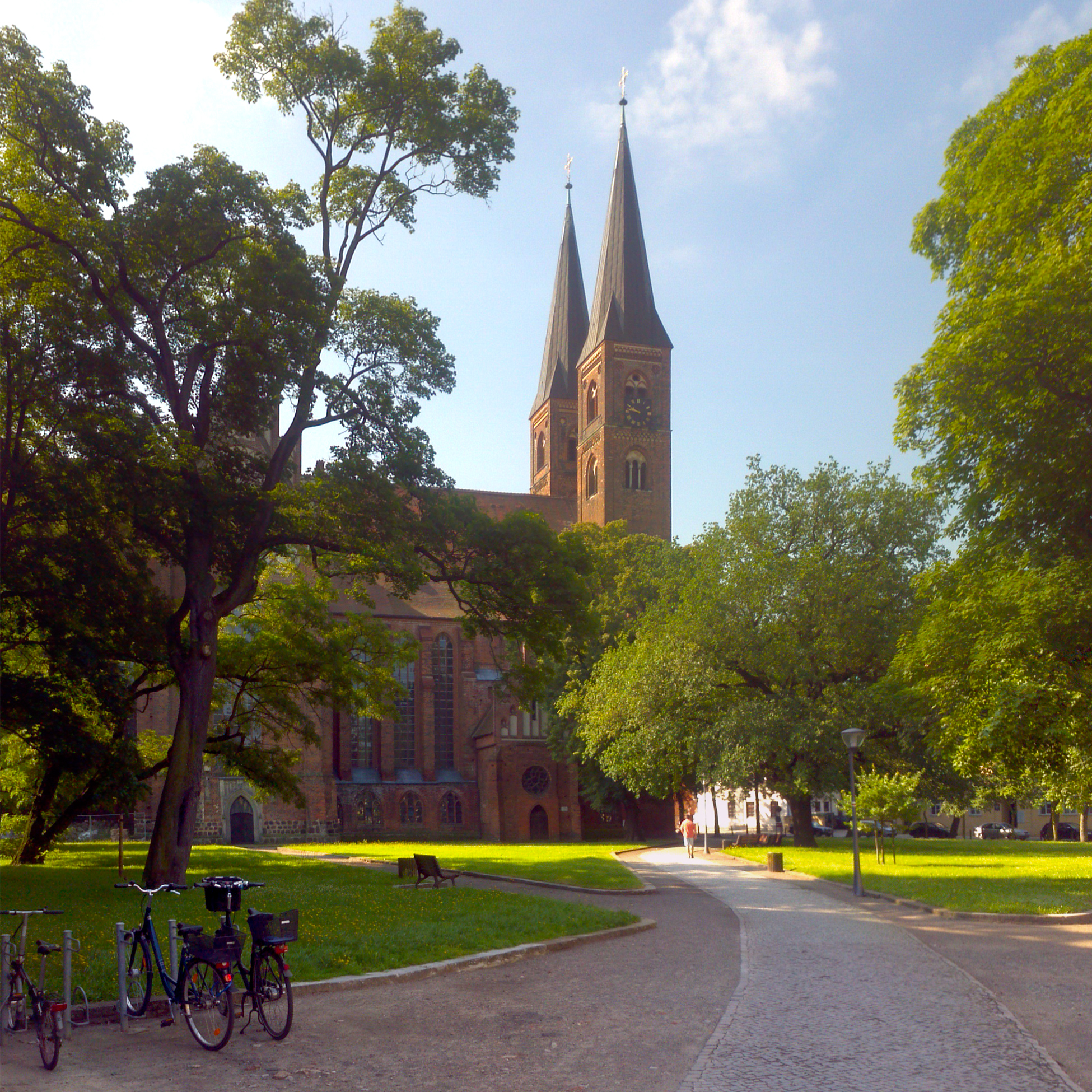
St. Nicholas Cathedral, Stendal (2012)

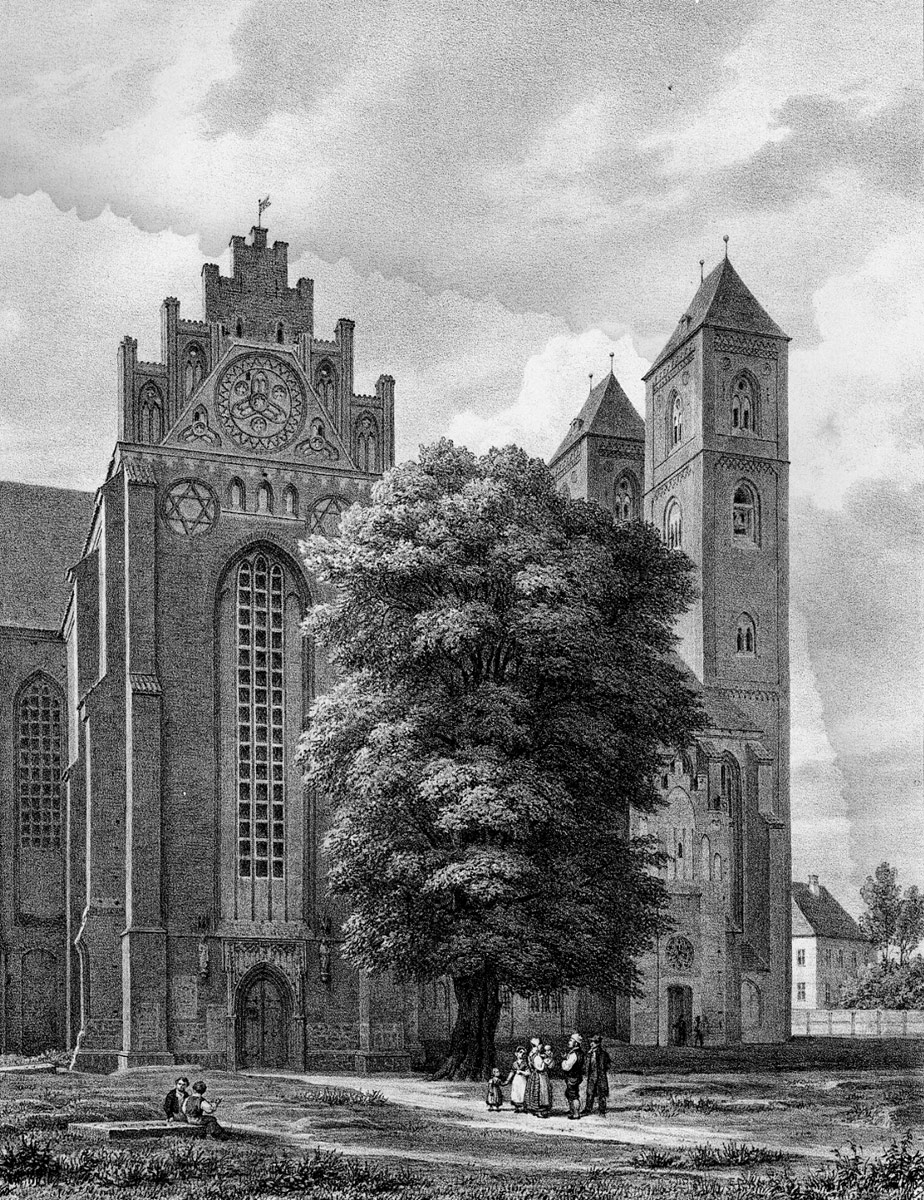
St. Nicholas, 1833

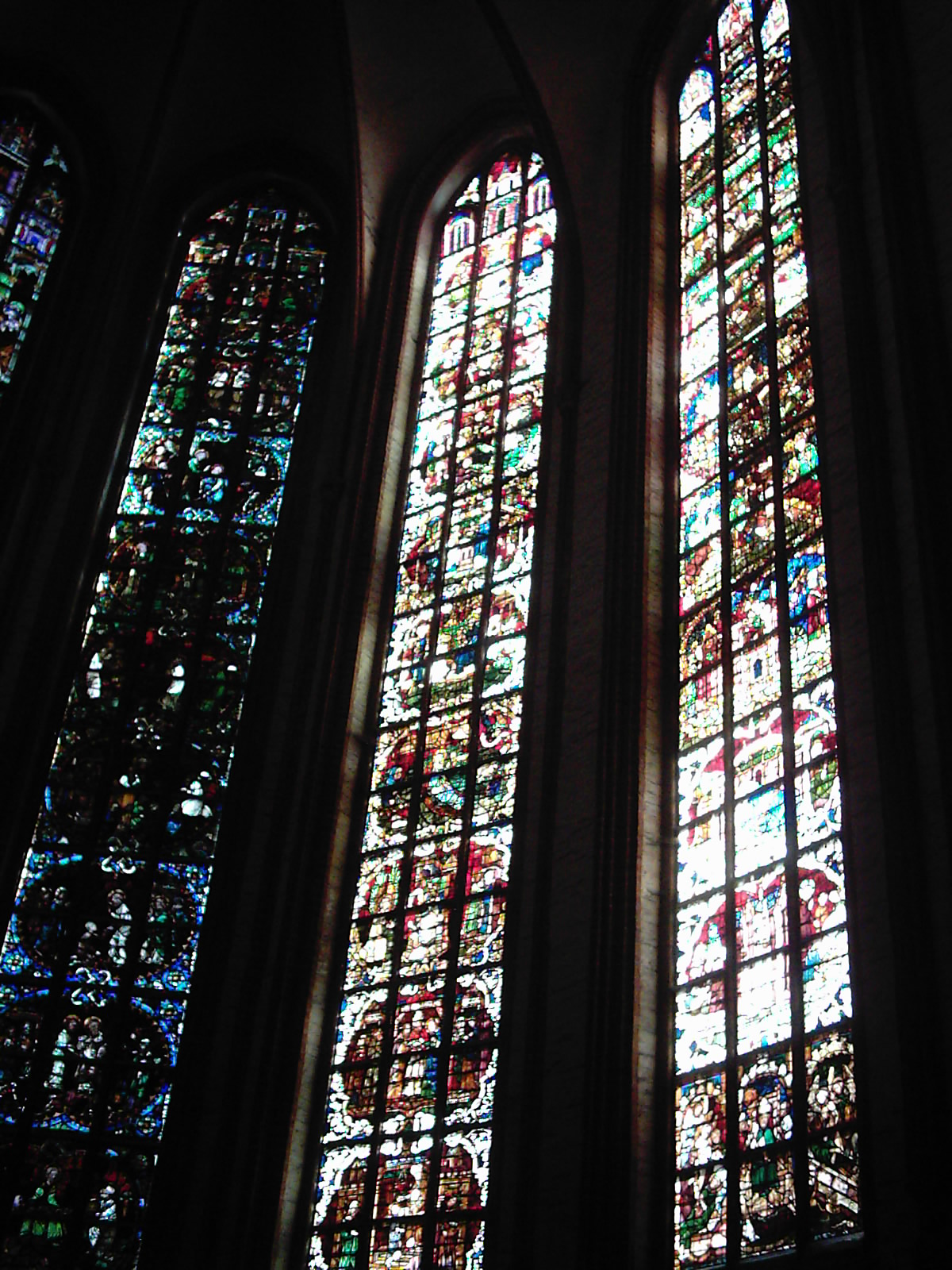
Stained-glass windows

St. Nicholas Cathedral, Stendal (German: Dom St. Nikolaus) is a brick Gothic church on the edge of the Old City of Stendal, in the Altmark of Saxony-Anhalt (Sachsen-Anhalt), Germany. The church, now affiliated with the Protestant (Lutheran) Evangelical Church in Germany, is famous for its large complement of late-medieval stained-glass windows.

== History ==
St. Nicholas was founded in 1188 by the Otto II, Margrave of Brandenburg and his brother Heinrich von Gardelegen, sons of Margrave Otto I, as a Collegiate church. As such, it was independent from the bishops of Brandenburg and under the direct supervision of the Papacy, and it exercised a leading religious role in the Mark.

The original church was a basilica with a nave, apse and two towers. The latter have survived the centuries and remain a landmark of Stendal. The balance of the current structure dates from 1423. The building extant today is largely as completed in the mid-15th century: A hall church with three transepts and an extended choir.

In 1551, as a result of the Reformation that swept northern Germany, St Nicholas's status as collegiate church was revoked, and its goods were conveyed to the University of Frankfurt at Frankfurt an der Oder.

Late in the Second World War, St. Nicholas suffered heavy damage from a U.S. bombing attack on April 8, 1945 – one month before the German capitulation. However, the cathedral's 22 medieval stained-glass windows had been recently removed and placed in safe storage, so they survived the war undamaged. Reconstruction started in 1946, was interrupted several times and was completed in 2013.

== Modern condition ==
The windows remain the highlight of St. Nicholas's artistic attractions. They were created between 1425 and 1480, and thoroughly restored in the 19th century.
