= Mathias Knispel =

German politician (born 1982)

Member of the Landtag of Saxony-Anhalt
- Incumbent
- Assumed office 2 April 2025
- Preceded by: Thomas Korell

Personal details
- Born: 1982 (age 43–44)
- Party: Alternative for Germany (since 2018)

Mathias Knispel (born 1982) is a German politician serving as a member of the Landtag of Saxony-Anhalt since 2025. He has served as group leader of the Alternative for Germany in the city council of Wolmirstedt since 2024.
