= Groß Schwechten =

- Stadtteil of Stendal
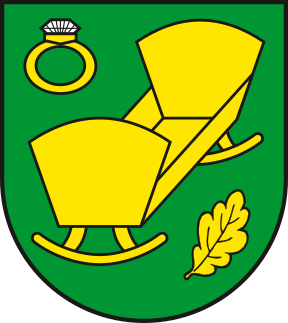
- Coat of arms
- Interactive map of Groß Schwechten
- Location within Germany Location within Saxony-Anhalt
- Coordinates: 52°40′N 11°48′E
- Country: Germany
- State: Saxony-Anhalt
- District: Stendal
- Town: Stendal

Area
  - Total: 24.54 km^{2} (9.47 sq mi)
- Elevation: 34 m (112 ft)

Population (2006-12-31)
  - Total: 647
  - Density: 26.4/km^{2} (68.3/sq mi)
- Time zone: UTC+01:00 (CET)
  - Summer (DST): UTC+02:00 (CEST)
- Postal codes: 39579
- Dialling codes: 039328
- Vehicle registration: SDL

Groß Schwechten is a village and a former municipality in the district of Stendal, in Saxony-Anhalt, Germany.

Since 1 January 2010, it is part of the town Stendal.
