= Uenglingen =

- Stadtteil of Stendal
- Interactive map of Uenglingen
- Location within Germany Location within Saxony-Anhalt
- Coordinates: 52°37′0″N 11°48′17″E
- Country: Germany
- State: Saxony-Anhalt
- District: Stendal
- Town: Stendal

Area
  - Total: 11.38 km^{2} (4.39 sq mi)
- Elevation: 43 m (141 ft)

Population (2006-12-31)
  - Total: 1,020
  - Density: 89.6/km^{2} (232/sq mi)
- Time zone: UTC+01:00 (CET)
  - Summer (DST): UTC+02:00 (CEST)
- Postal codes: 39579
- Dialling codes: 03931
- Vehicle registration: SDL

Uenglingen is a village and a former municipality in the district of Stendal, in Saxony-Anhalt, Germany.

Since 1 January 2010, it is part of the town Stendal.
