= Vinzelberg =

- Stadtteil of Stendal
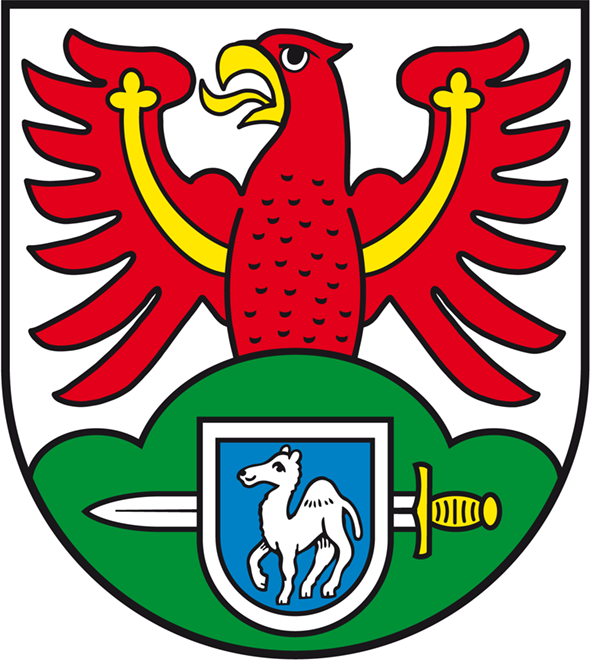
- Coat of arms
- Interactive map of Vinzelberg
- Location within Germany Location within Saxony-Anhalt
- Coordinates: 52°33′36″N 11°39′36″E
- Country: Germany
- State: Saxony-Anhalt
- District: Stendal
- Town: Stendal

Area
  - Total: 5.61 km^{2} (2.17 sq mi)
- Elevation: 51 m (167 ft)

Population (2008-12-31)
  - Total: 286
  - Density: 51.0/km^{2} (132/sq mi)
- Time zone: UTC+01:00 (CET)
  - Summer (DST): UTC+02:00 (CEST)
- Postal codes: 39599
- Dialling codes: 039325
- Vehicle registration: SDL

Vinzelberg is a village and a former municipality in the district of Stendal, in Saxony-Anhalt, Germany. Since 29 April 2010, it is part of the town Stendal. Its 2008 population was 286.
