= Insel, Saxony-Anhalt =

Insel
- Stadtteil of Stendal
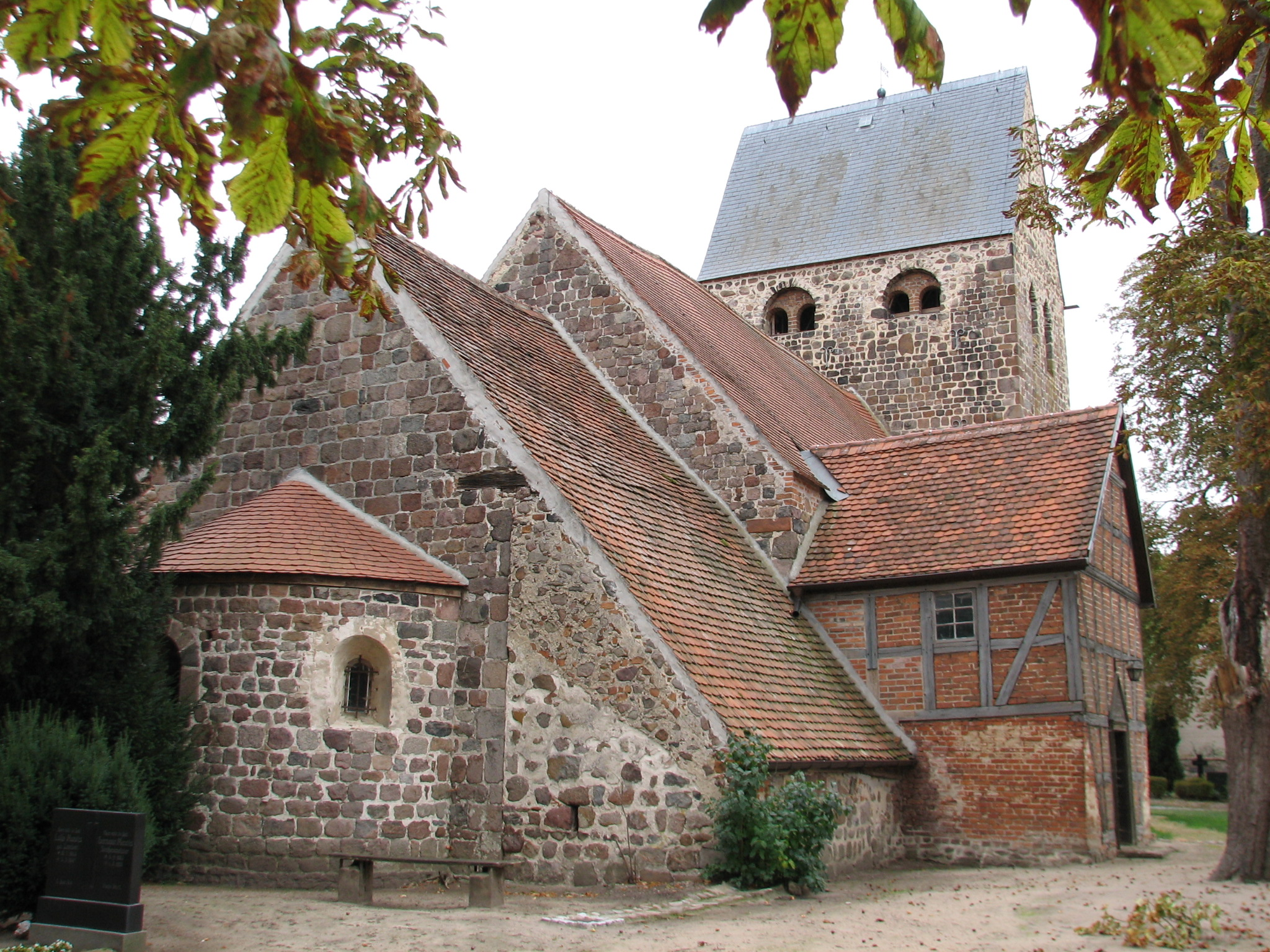
- Church in Insel
- Interactive map of Insel
- Location within Germany Location within Saxony-Anhalt
- Coordinates: 52°34′N 11°45′E
- Country: Germany
- State: Saxony-Anhalt
- District: Stendal
- Town: Stendal

Area
  - Total: 25.16 km^{2} (9.71 sq mi)
- Elevation: 36 m (118 ft)

Population (2009-12-31)
  - Total: 729
  - Density: 29.0/km^{2} (75.0/sq mi)
- Time zone: UTC+01:00 (CET)
  - Summer (DST): UTC+02:00 (CEST)
- Postal codes: 39599
- Dialling codes: 039329
- Vehicle registration: SDL

Insel (German pronunciation: [ˈɪnzl̩]) is a village and a former municipality in the district of Stendal, in Saxony-Anhalt, Germany.

Since 1 September 2010, it is part of the town Stendal.
