= Dahlen, Saxony-Anhalt =

Dahlen
- Stadtteil of Stendal
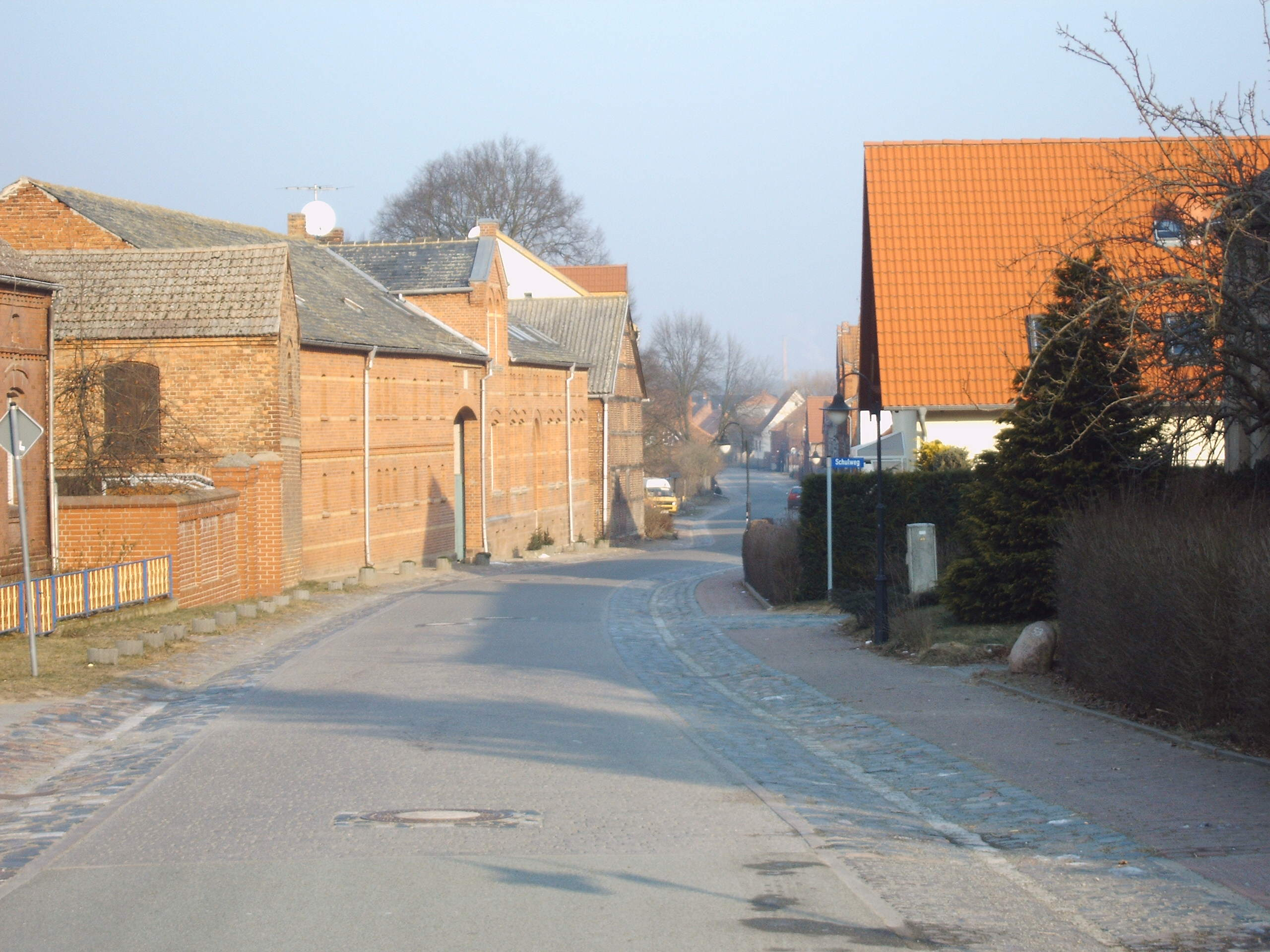
- A street in the village
- Interactive map of Dahlen
- Location within Germany Location within Saxony-Anhalt
- Coordinates: 52°33′32″N 11°49′32″E
- Country: Germany
- State: Saxony-Anhalt
- District: Stendal
- Town: Stendal

Area
  - Total: 24.54 km^{2} (9.47 sq mi)
- Elevation: 32 m (105 ft)

Population (2009-12-31)
  - Total: 630
  - Density: 26/km^{2} (66/sq mi)
- Time zone: UTC+01:00 (CET)
  - Summer (DST): UTC+02:00 (CEST)
- Postal codes: 39579
- Dialling codes: 03931
- Vehicle registration: SDL

Dahlen (German pronunciation: [ˈdaːlən]) is a village and a former municipality in the district of Stendal, in Saxony-Anhalt, Germany.

Since 1 September 2010, it is part of the town Stendal.
