= Matthias Höhn =

German politician (born 1975)

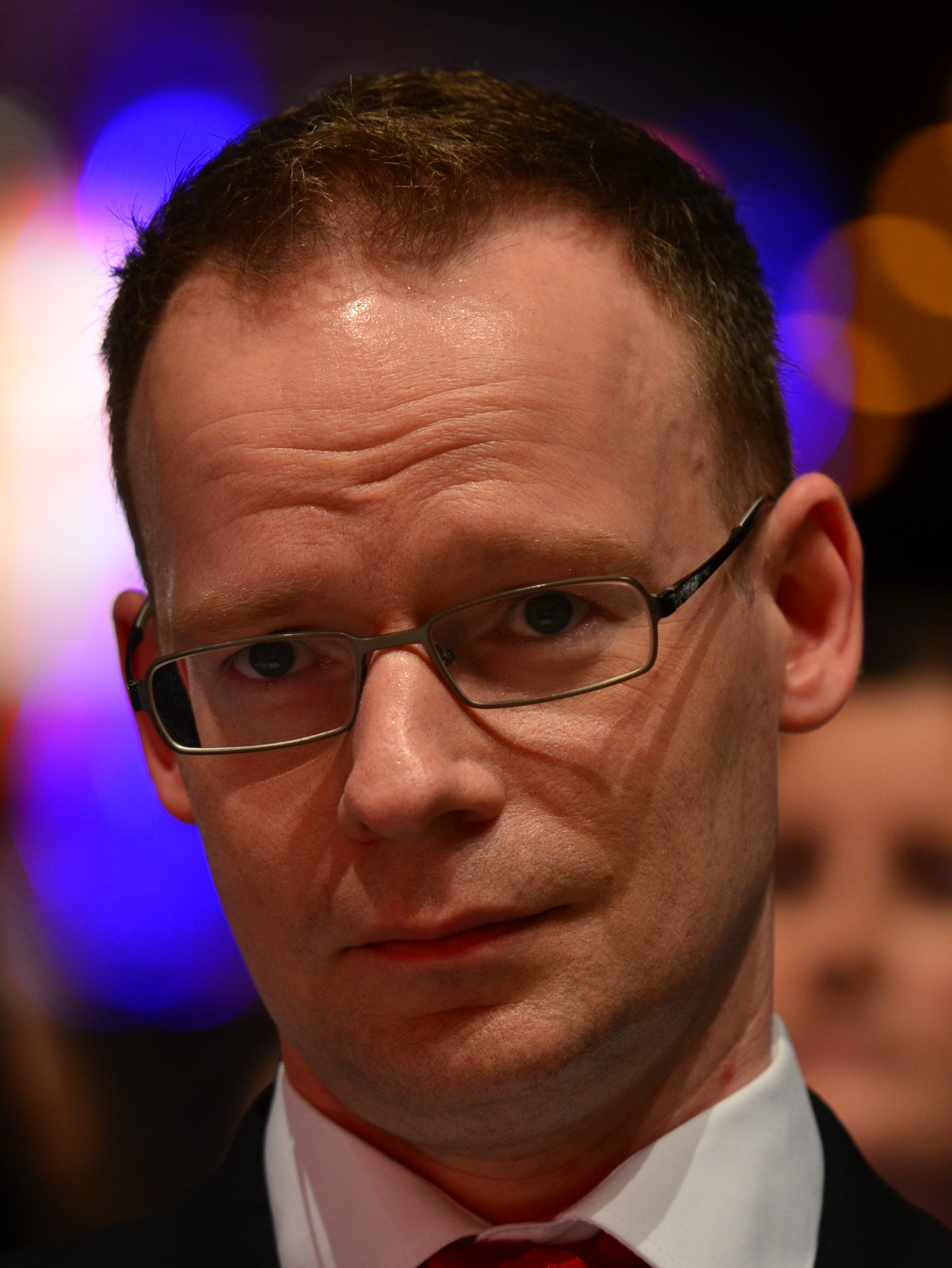
- Matthias Höhn in 2014

Member of the Bundestag
- In office 2017–2021

Personal details
- Born: 19 August 1975 (age 50) Stolberg, West Germany (now Germany)
- Party: The Left

Matthias Höhn (born 19 August 1975) is a German politician. Born in Stolberg, Saxony-Anhalt, he represents The Left. Matthias Höhn has served as a member of the Bundestag from the state of Saxony-Anhalt from 2017 to 2021.

== Life ==
Matthias Höhn was born in Stolberg in the Harz Mountains, but grew up in Sangerhausen from 1977 onwards, where he also spent his entire school career. In 1982 he was enrolled at the Polytechnic High School (POS) "Bernhard Koenen". From 1984 to 1991 he then attended the POS "Juri Gagarin" and from 1991 to 1994 the state grammar school "Geschwister Scholl", which he left with High school graduation. He completed his military service in 1994/95. From 1995 to 2003 he studied journalism and communication sciences and Slavic philology at the Free University of Berlin. He was a member of the state parliament of Saxony-Anhalt from 2002 to 2017. He became member of the bundestag after the 2017 German federal election. He is a member of the defense committee. For his group he is spokesman for security policy. Höhn is married with his husband.
