= Buchholz, Saxony-Anhalt =

Buchholz
- Stadtteil of Stendal
- Interactive map of Buchholz
- Location within Germany Location within Saxony-Anhalt
- Coordinates: 52°32′12″N 11°47′12″E
- Country: Germany
- State: Saxony-Anhalt
- District: Stendal
- Town: Stendal

Area
  - Total: 8.94 km^{2} (3.45 sq mi)
- Elevation: 66 m (217 ft)

Population (2006-12-31)
  - Total: 294
  - Density: 32.9/km^{2} (85.2/sq mi)
- Time zone: UTC+01:00 (CET)
  - Summer (DST): UTC+02:00 (CEST)
- Postal codes: 39579
- Dialling codes: 039361
- Vehicle registration: SDL

Buchholz (German pronunciation: [ˈbuːxhɔlts]) is a village and a former municipality in the district of Stendal, in Saxony-Anhalt, Germany.

Since 1 January 2010, it is part of the town Stendal.
