= Heeren =

- Ortschaft of Stendal
- Interactive map of Heeren
- Location within Germany Location within Saxony-Anhalt
- Coordinates: 52°32′23″N 11°53′35″E
- Country: Germany
- State: Saxony-Anhalt
- District: Stendal
- Town: Stendal

Area
  - Total: 13.54 km^{2} (5.23 sq mi)
- Elevation: 39 m (128 ft)

Population (2006-12-31)
  - Total: 570
  - Density: 42/km^{2} (110/sq mi)
- Time zone: UTC+01:00 (CET)
  - Summer (DST): UTC+02:00 (CEST)
- Postal codes: 39590
- Dialling codes: 03931
- Vehicle registration: SDL

Heeren (German pronunciation: [ˈheːʁən]) is a village and a former municipality in the district of Stendal, in Saxony-Anhalt, Germany. Since 1 January 2010, it is part of the town Stendal, of which it is an Ortschaft (municipal division).

== Notable residents ==
- Albert Ferdinand Adolf Karl Friedrich von Bonin (1803–1872), Prussian general
