= Hohengöhren =

- Ortsteil of Schönhausen
- Interactive map of Hohengöhren
- Location within Germany Location within Saxony-Anhalt
- Coordinates: 52°37′N 12°2′E
- Country: Germany
- State: Saxony-Anhalt
- District: Stendal
- Municipality: Schönhausen

Area
  - Total: 28.24 km^{2} (10.90 sq mi)
- Elevation: 29 m (95 ft)

Population (2006-12-31)
  - Total: 445
  - Density: 15.8/km^{2} (40.8/sq mi)
- Time zone: UTC+01:00 (CET)
  - Summer (DST): UTC+02:00 (CEST)
- Postal codes: 39524
- Dialling codes: 039323
- Vehicle registration: SDL

Hohengöhren is a village and a former municipality in the district of Stendal, in Saxony-Anhalt, Germany. Since 1 January 2010, it is part of the municipality Schönhausen.

It lies along the Elbe river. In 2013, the railway between Hohengöhren and Schönhausen experienced significant flooding due to a dam burst.
