= Möringen =

- Stadtteil of Stendal
- Interactive map of Möringen
- Location within Germany Location within Saxony-Anhalt
- Coordinates: 52°35′48″N 11°44′35″E
- Country: Germany
- State: Saxony-Anhalt
- District: Stendal
- Town: Stendal

Area
  - Total: 17.35 km^{2} (6.70 sq mi)
- Elevation: 34 m (112 ft)

Population (2006-12-31)
  - Total: 797
  - Density: 45.9/km^{2} (119/sq mi)
- Time zone: UTC+01:00 (CET)
  - Summer (DST): UTC+02:00 (CEST)
- Postal codes: 39599
- Dialling codes: 039329
- Vehicle registration: SDL

Möringen (German pronunciation: [ˈmøːʁɪŋən]) is a village and a former municipality in the district of Stendal, in Saxony-Anhalt, Germany.

Since 1 January 2010, it is part of the town Stendal.
