= Staats, Saxony-Anhalt =

- Stadtteil of Stendal
- Interactive map of Staats, Saxony-Anhalt
- Location within Germany Location within Saxony-Anhalt
- Coordinates: 52°32′23″N 11°37′59″E
- Country: Germany
- State: Saxony-Anhalt
- District: Stendal
- Town: Stendal

Area
  - Total: 14.29 km^{2} (5.52 sq mi)
- Elevation: 50 m (160 ft)

Population (2006-12-31)
  - Total: 280
  - Density: 20/km^{2} (51/sq mi)
- Time zone: UTC+01:00 (CET)
  - Summer (DST): UTC+02:00 (CEST)
- Postal codes: 39599
- Dialling codes: 039325
- Vehicle registration: SDL

Staats (German pronunciation: [ʃtaːts]) is a village and a former municipality in the district of Stendal, in Saxony-Anhalt, Germany.

On 1 January 2010, it became part of the town of Stendal.
