= Uchtspringe =

- Stadtteil of Stendal
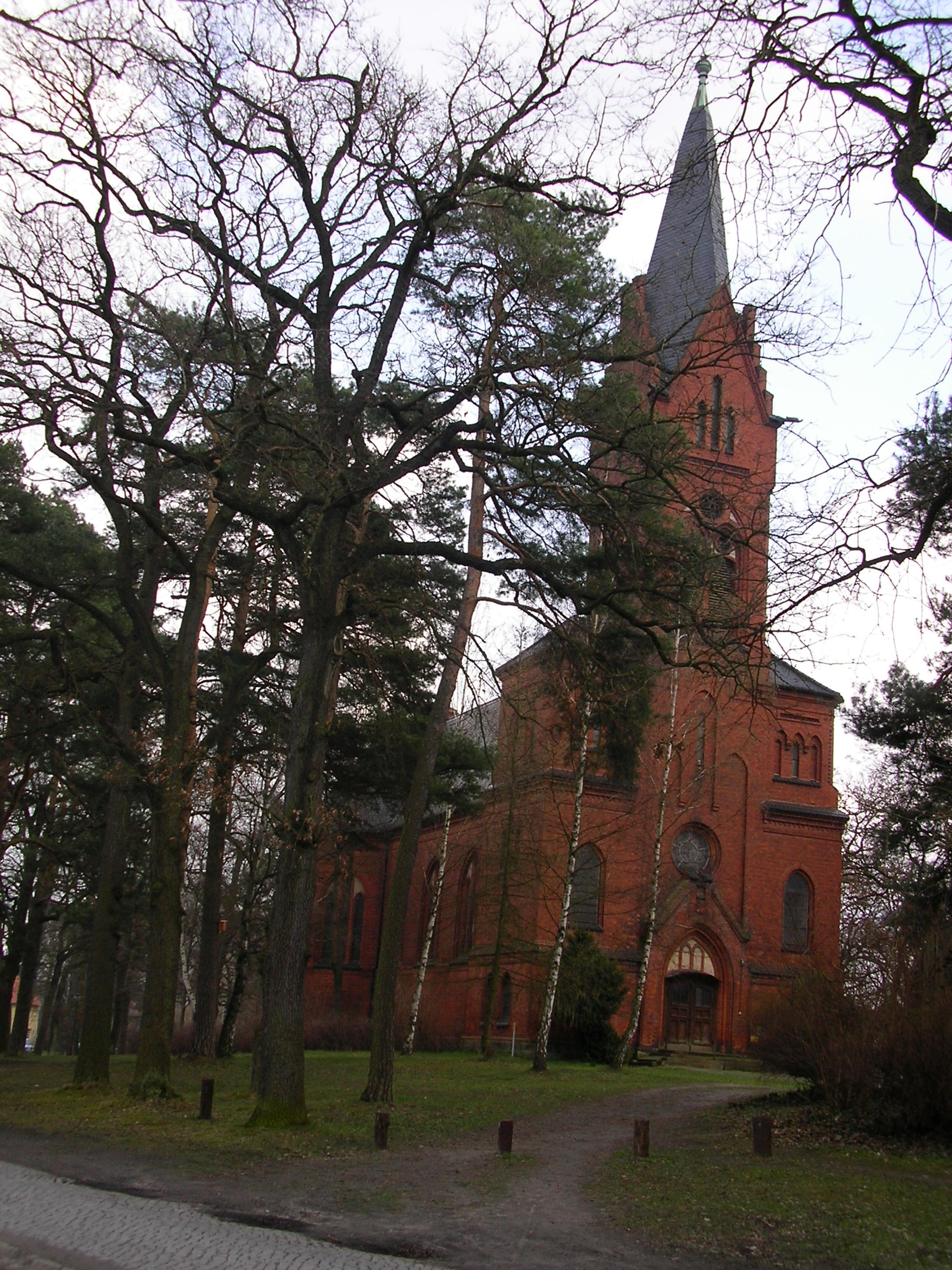
- A church in Uchtspringe

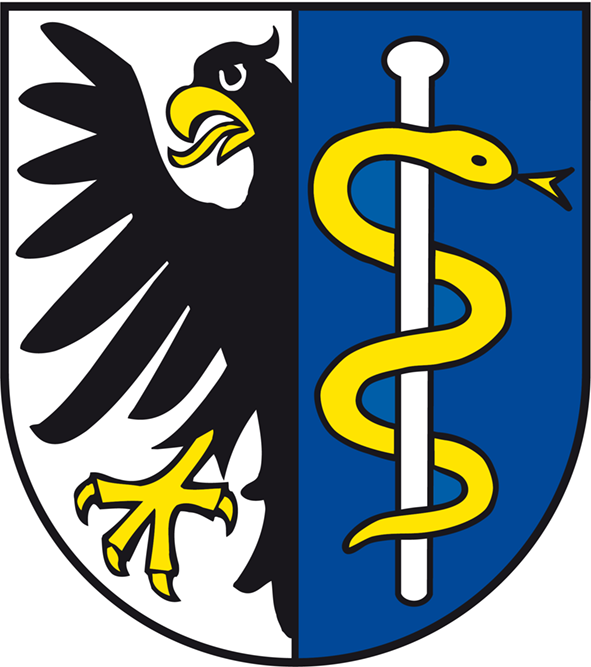
- Coat of arms
- Interactive map of Uchtspringe
- Location within Germany Location within Saxony-Anhalt
- Coordinates: 52°32′12″N 11°36′24″E
- Country: Germany
- State: Saxony-Anhalt
- District: Stendal
- Town: Stendal

Area
  - Total: 10.74 km^{2} (4.15 sq mi)
- Elevation: 80 m (260 ft)

Population (2006-12-31)
  - Total: 1,385
  - Density: 129.0/km^{2} (334.0/sq mi)
- Time zone: UTC+01:00 (CET)
  - Summer (DST): UTC+02:00 (CEST)
- Postal codes: 39599
- Dialling codes: 039325
- Vehicle registration: SDL

Uchtspringe is a village and a former municipality in the district of Stendal, in Saxony-Anhalt, Germany.

Since 1 January 2010, Uchtspringe is part of the town Stendal.
