= Volgfelde =

- Stadtteil of Stendal
- Interactive map of Volgfelde
- Location within Germany Location within Saxony-Anhalt
- Coordinates: 52°33′36″N 11°38′24″E
- Country: Germany
- State: Saxony-Anhalt
- District: Stendal
- Town: Stendal

Area
  - Total: 7.31 km^{2} (2.82 sq mi)
- Elevation: 46 m (151 ft)

Population (2006-12-31)
  - Total: 197
  - Density: 26.9/km^{2} (69.8/sq mi)
- Time zone: UTC+01:00 (CET)
  - Summer (DST): UTC+02:00 (CEST)
- Postal codes: 39599
- Dialling codes: 039325
- Vehicle registration: SDL

Volgfelde (German pronunciation: [fɔlkˈfɛldə]) is a village and a former municipality in the district of Stendal, in Saxony-Anhalt, Germany.

Since 1 January 2010, it is part of the town Stendal.
