= Nahrstedt =

- Stadtteil of Stendal
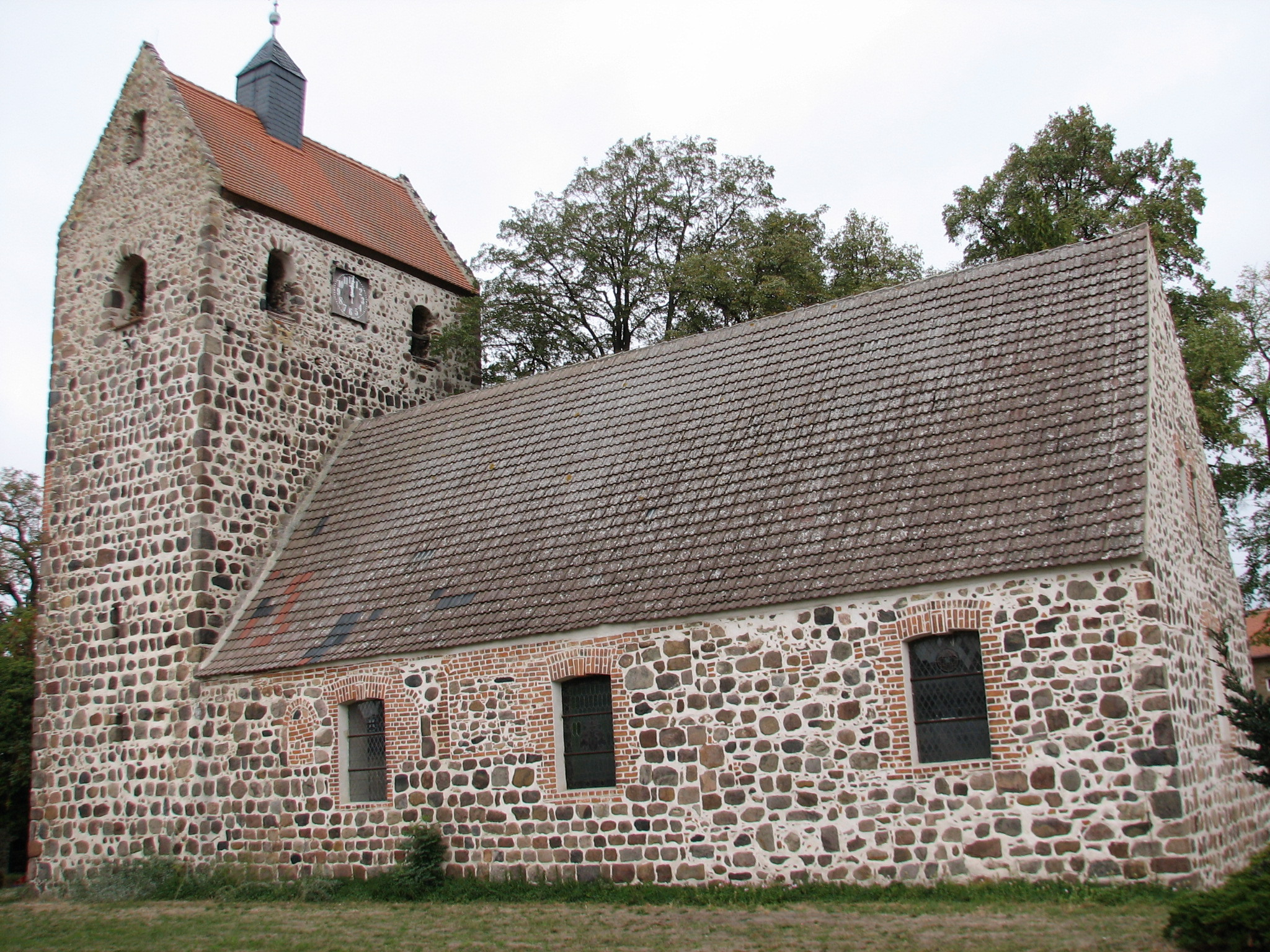
- Church in Nahrstedt
- Interactive map of Nahrstedt
- Location within Germany Location within Saxony-Anhalt
- Coordinates: 52°34′47″N 11°43′0″E
- Country: Germany
- State: Saxony-Anhalt
- District: Stendal
- Town: Stendal

Area
  - Total: 8.63 km^{2} (3.33 sq mi)
- Elevation: 35 m (115 ft)

Population (2006-12-31)
  - Total: 295
  - Density: 34.2/km^{2} (88.5/sq mi)
- Time zone: UTC+01:00 (CET)
  - Summer (DST): UTC+02:00 (CEST)
- Postal codes: 39599
- Dialling codes: 039329
- Vehicle registration: SDL

Nahrstedt (German pronunciation: [ˈnaːɐ̯ʃtɛt]) is a village and a former municipality in the district of Stendal, in Saxony-Anhalt, Germany.

Since 1 January 2010, it is part of the town Stendal.
