= Eckhard Gnodtke =

German politician (born 1958)

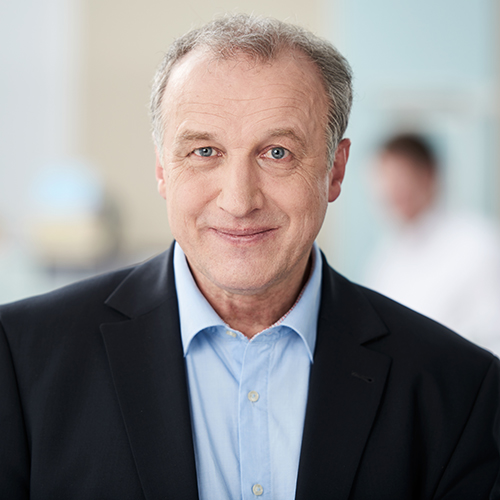
- Eckhard Gnodtke in 2017

Member of the Bundestag
- Incumbent
- Assumed office 2017

Personal details
- Born: 7 January 1958 (age 68) Lüchow, West Germany
- Party: CDU

Eckhard Gnodtke (born 7 January 1958) is a German politician. Born in Lüchow, Lower Saxony, he represents the CDU. Eckhard Gnodtke has served as a member of the Bundestag from the state of Saxony-Anhalt since 2017.

== Life ==
He became member of the bundestag after the 2017 German federal election. He is a member of the defense committee.
