= Marcus Faber =

German politician (born 1984)

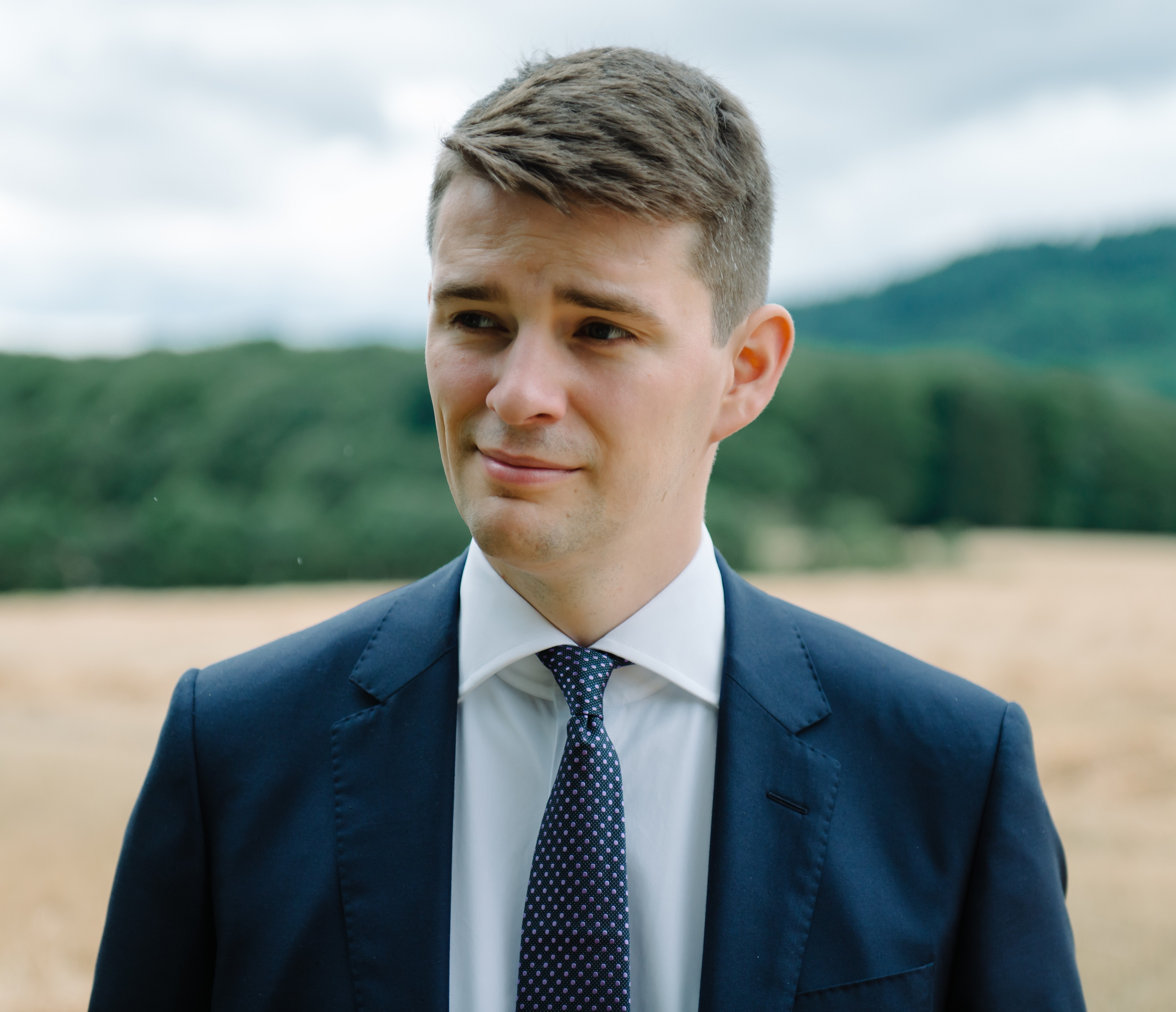
- Faber in 2015

Member of the Bundestag
- In office 24 October 2017 – 2025

Chair of the Defence Committee
- Incumbent
- Assumed office 12 June 2024
- Deputy: Henning Otte
- Preceded by: Marie-Agnes Strack-Zimmermann

Personal details
- Born: 4 February 1984 (age 42) Stendal, East Germany (now Germany)
- Citizenship: German
- Party: FDP
- Occupation: Political Scientist

Marcus Faber (born 4 February 1984) is a German politician of the Free Democratic Party (FDP) who served as a member of the Bundestag from the state of Saxony-Anhalt from 2017 to 2025.

== Early life and education ==
Faber attended the Rudolf-Hildebrand-Gymnasium in Stendal, where he graduated from high school in March 2003. Afterwards he served as a conscript in Armoured Engineer Battalion 803 in the Elb-Havel barracks in Havelberg. From 2003 to 2008, he studied political science at the University of Potsdam and Western Sydney University, graduating with a degree in political science.

== Political career ==
In the 2017 federal elections, Faber ran for election in the Altmark constituency and was elected to the German Bundestag via the FDP state list. In parliament, he has since been a member of the Defense Committee. From 2021 to 2022, he briefly served as his parliamentary group's spokesperson for defense policy. In 2025 he was not re-elected to the German Bundestag and lost his parliamentary seat.

== Life after politics ==
After leaving parliament, Faber joined Elbit Systems in 2025.

== Other activities ==
- German-Israeli Society, Member of the Board (2017-2019), Vice-Chairman (since 2019)
- German-Taiwanese Association, Vice-Chairman (2019-2022), Chairman (since 2022)
