= Stendal =

Town in Saxony-Anhalt, Germany

- Town
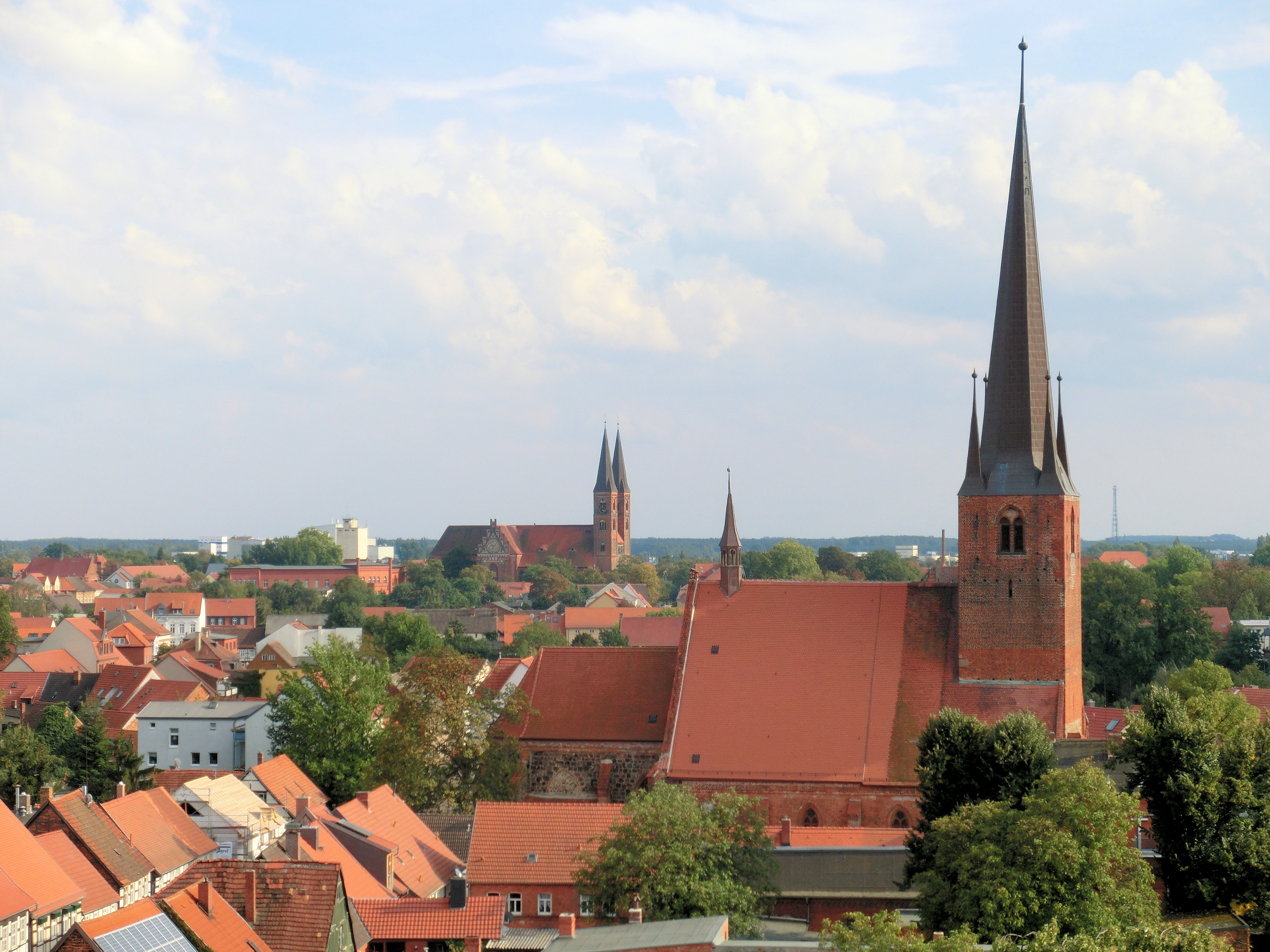
- September 2011 view over Stendal with the St. Nicholas Church

- Coat of arms

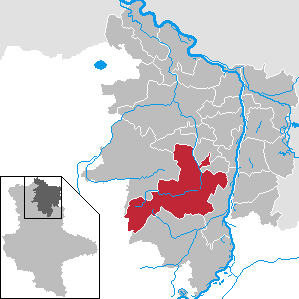
- Location of Stendal within Stendal district
- Interactive map of Stendal
- Location within Germany Location within Saxony-Anhalt
- Coordinates: 52°36′N 11°51′E
- Country: Germany
- State: Saxony-Anhalt
- District: Stendal
- Subdivisions: 33

Government
  - Mayor (2022–29): Bastian Sieler

Area
  - Total: 268.02 km^{2} (103.48 sq mi)
- Elevation: 31 m (102 ft)

Population (2025-12-31)
  - Total: 37,750
  - Density: 140.8/km^{2} (364.8/sq mi)
- Time zone: UTC+01:00 (CET)
  - Summer (DST): UTC+02:00 (CEST)
- Postal codes: 39551–39596
- Dialling codes: 03931
- Vehicle registration: SDL
- Website: www.stendal.de

Stendal (German pronunciation: [ˈʃtɛndaːl]), officially the Hanseatic City of Stendal (German: Hansestadt Stendal), is a town in Saxony-Anhalt, Germany. It is the capital of the Stendal District and the unofficial capital of the Altmark region.

== Geography ==
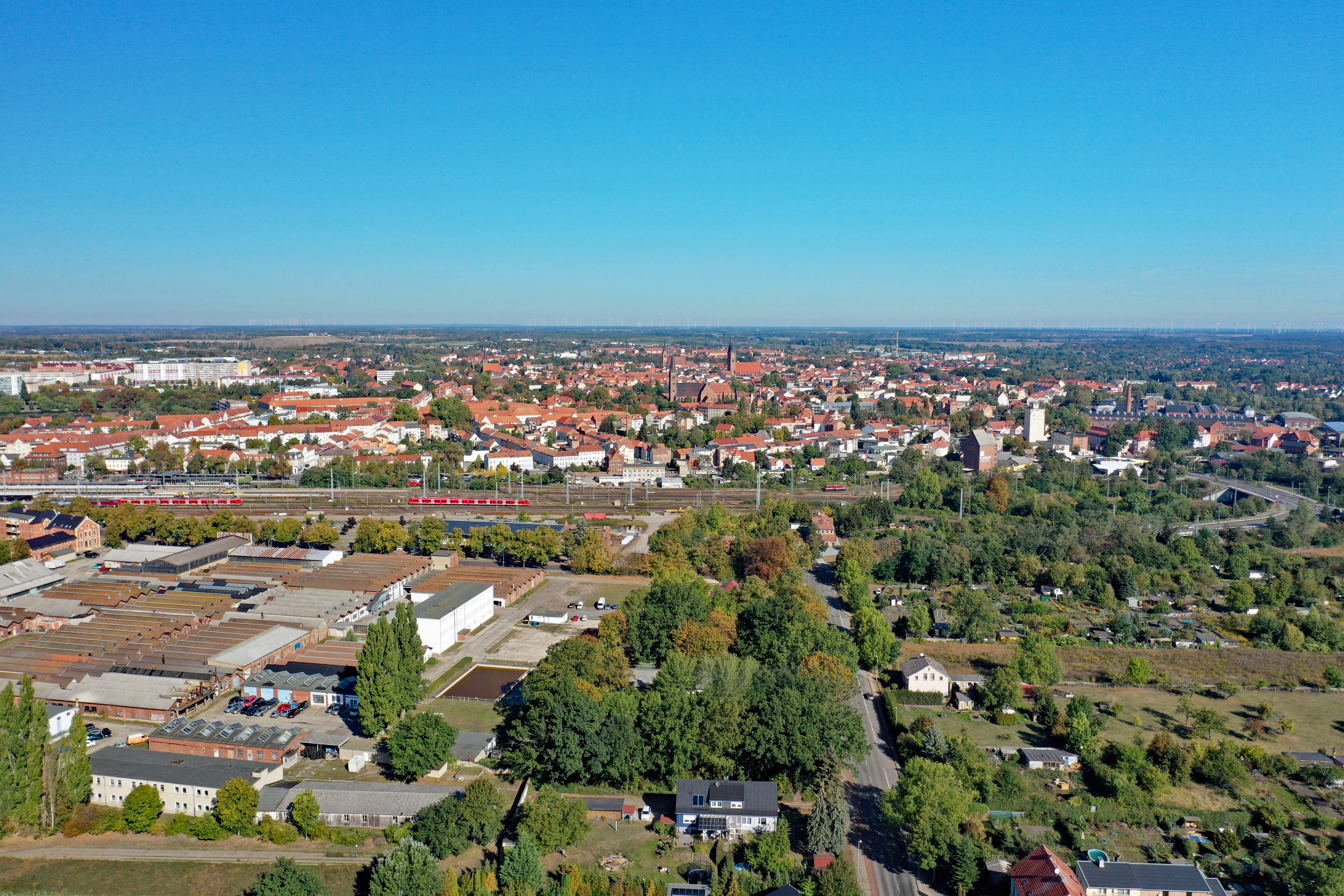
Aerial view of Stendal

Situated west of the Elbe valley, the Stendal town centre is located some 125 km (78 mi) west of Berlin, around 170 km (110 mi) east of Hanover, and 55 km (34 mi) north of the state capital Magdeburg. Stendal is the seat of a University of Applied Sciences (Fachhochschule) and preserves a picturesque old town including a historic market and several churches. The nearby village Uchtspringe is home to a psychiatric rehabilitation clinic.

=== Divisions ===
The town Stendal consists of Stendal proper and the following 18 Ortschaften or municipal divisions:

- Bindfelde
- Borstel
- Buchholz
- Dahlen
- Groß Schwechten
- Heeren
- Insel
- Jarchau
- Möringen
- Nahrstedt
- Staats
- Staffelde
- Uchtspringe
- Uenglingen
- Vinzelberg
- Volgfelde
- Wahrburg
- Wittenmoor

== History ==
A settlement named Steinedal in the Eastphalian Balsamgau of Saxony, then a possession of Saint Michael’s Abbey in Hildesheim, was mentioned in a deed allegedly issued by Emperor Henry II in 1022. However, the entry has proven to be a 12th-century forgery, as the original document contained no such record. The fortified town near the Elbe crossing at Tangermünde was actually founded and granted Magdeburg rights by the first Brandenburg margrave Albert the Bear about 1160.

The parish church of St Mary's was first mentioned in 1283. Stendal quickly prospered as a centre of commerce and trade; it received city walls about 1300, the citizens joined the Hanseatic League in 1358 and purchased the privilege of minting from the Brandenburg margraves in 1369. A Latin school is documented from 1338. In 1456 the Hohenzollern elector Frederick II Irontooth founded a convent of Augustinian nuns, which today is the site of a museum. In 1502 his descendant Elector Joachim I Nestor married Princess Elizabeth of Denmark at Stendal. Several churches, the town hall and the two remaining city gates show Stendal's wealth in the period.

The Stendal citizens turned Protestant in 1539, with the reformator Konrad Cordatus serving as superintendent. In the 1680s and 1690s, Waldensian, Palatine and Swiss religious refugees settled in the town. For centuries part of the Margraviate of Brandenburg, Stendal with the Altmark region passed to the Prussian Province of Saxony after the Napoleonic Wars. A Prussian garrison town since the 17th century, it hosted the 10th (Magdeburg) Hussars regiment from 1884.

Stendal was the site of a Luftwaffe airfield in World War II, which had been the site of the first German Fallschirmjäger training school from 1936; the boxer Max Schmeling was trained as a paratrooper here in 1940/41. The town suffered from strategic bombing. Stendal was hit by 10 air raids, and more than 300 civilians died when Röxe, a residential area in the southern part of the town, was devastated by bombs. The Cathedral and various historical buildings were heavily damaged by bombs. In April 1945, the aerodrome served as starting place of the Sonderkommando Elbe unit, only a few days before the local authorities surrendered to the US Army. On May 4, the commander of the Wehrmacht 12th Army, General Maximilian von Edelsheim, signed the capitulation document at the Stendal town hall. In July 1945, Stendal was handed over to Soviet occupation.

From 1949 until German reunification in 1990, the town belonged to East Germany, part of Bezirk Magdeburg from 1952. Until 1994, the Stendal barracks served as home base for a riflemen division of the Soviet 2nd Guards Tank Army. In 1974 the construction of the Stendal Nuclear Power Plant was begun north of the town, but abandoned after reunification. In 2009 the Stendal citizens voted for the prefix Hansestadt ("Hanseatic City").

On 1 January 2010, the town Stendal absorbed the former municipalities Buchholz, Groß Schwechten, Heeren, Möringen, Nahrstedt, Staats, Uchtspringe, Uenglingen, Volgfelde, and Wittenmoor. On 29 April 2010, it absorbed Vinzelberg, and on 1 September 2010 Dahlen and Insel.

== Education ==
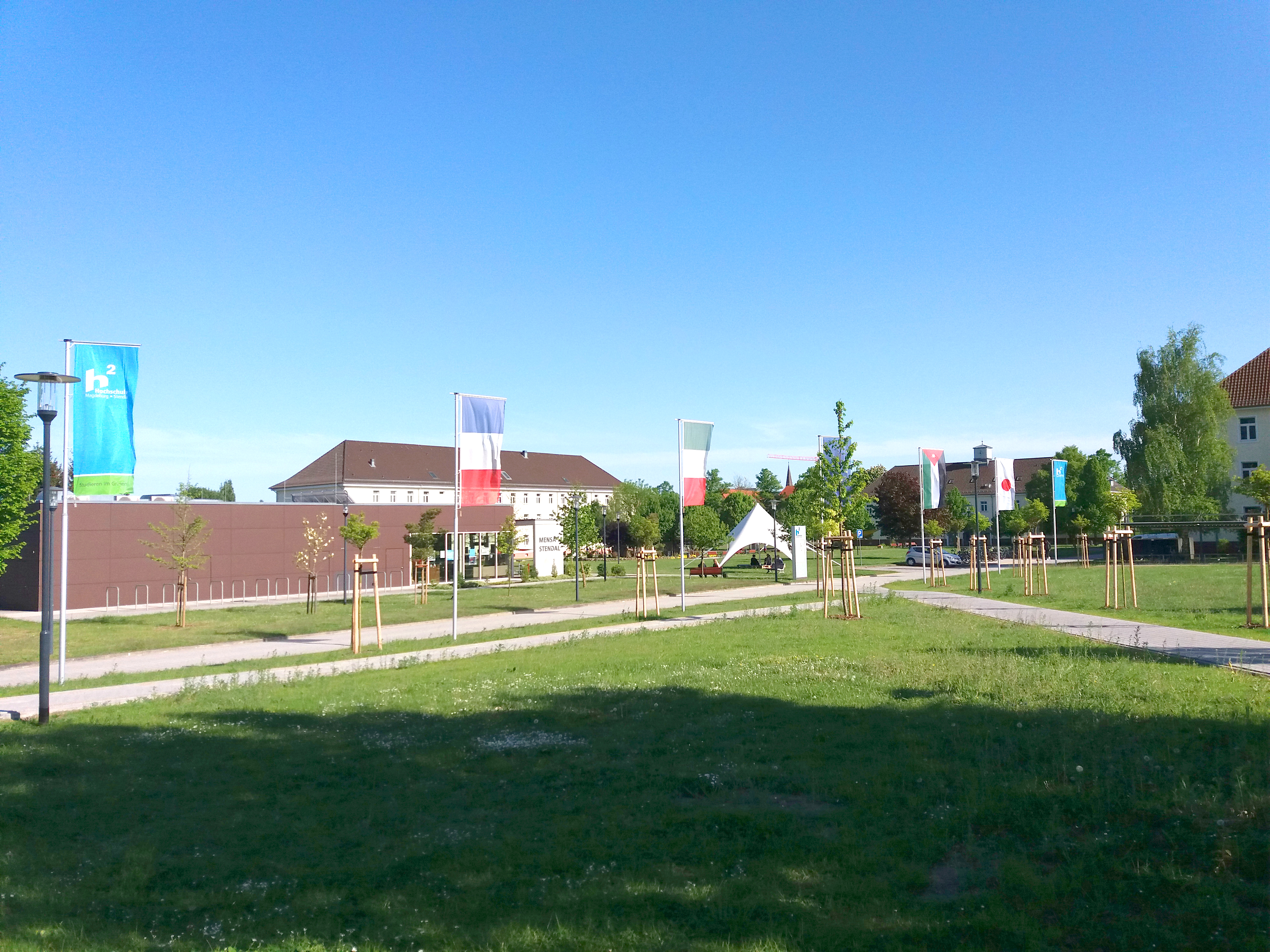
Part of the campus in Stendal

The Magdeburg-Stendal University of Applied Sciences was founded in 1991 and has around 50 study programmes taught at three departments in Magdeburg and two departments in Stendal. There are approximately 130 professors with around 3,700 students in Magdeburg and 1,800 in Stendal.

== Main sights ==
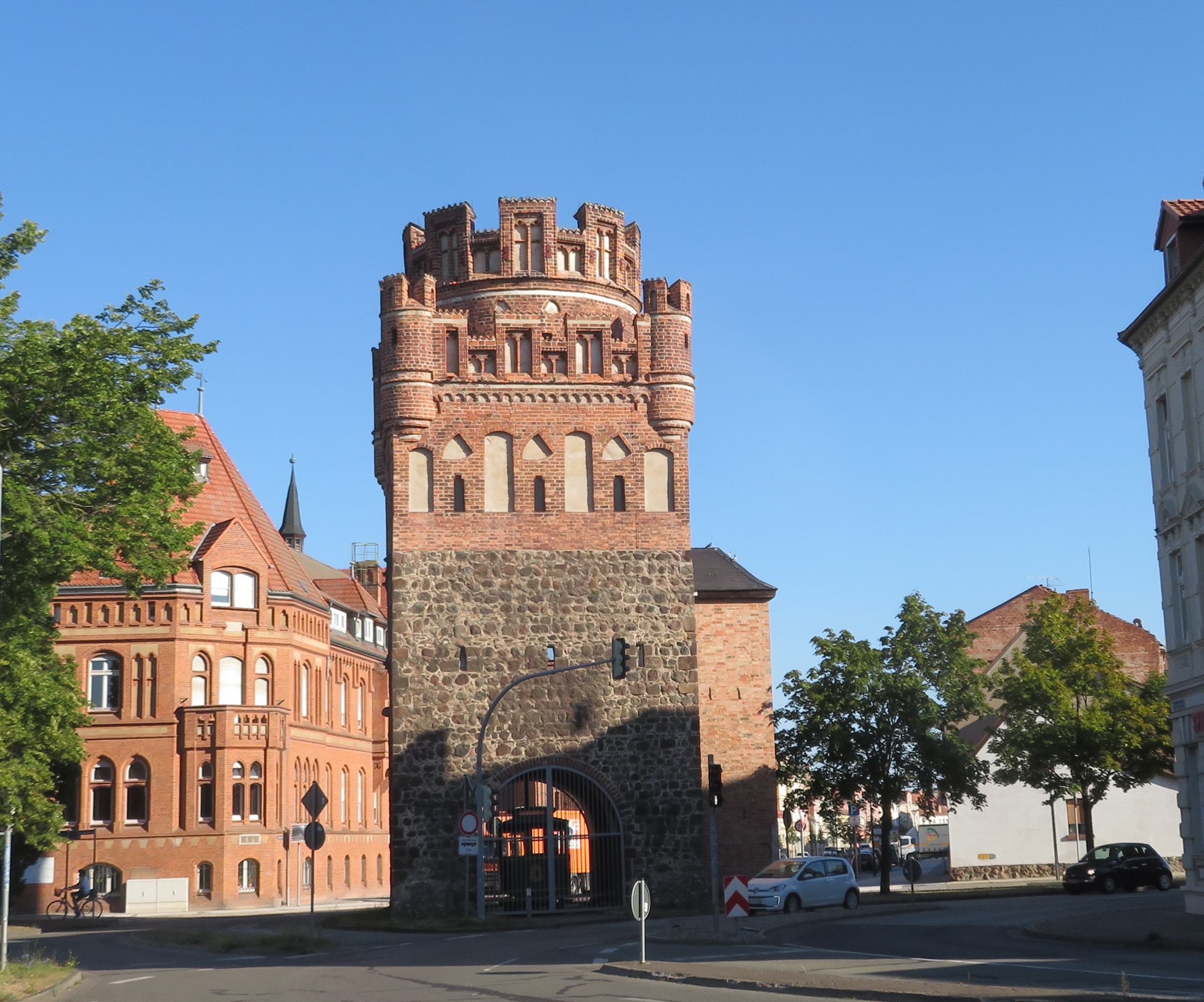
Tangermünde Gate

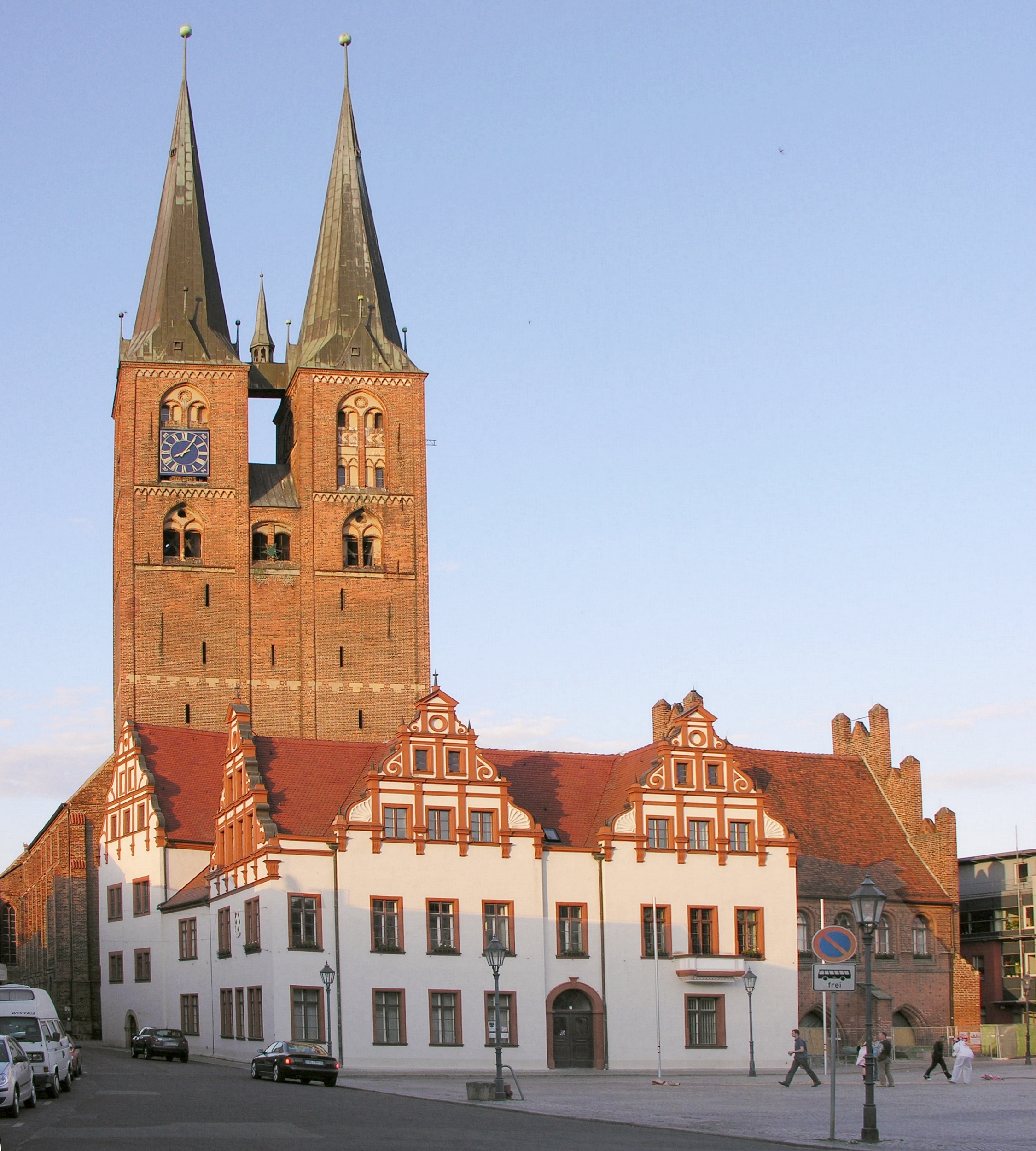
St. Mary's Church and City Hall

There are various well-preserved historical buildings in Stendal, e.g., the Tangemünde Gate, a medieval city gate dating from 1220 and Uenglinger Gate built in the 15th century. The Powder Tower (Pulverturm) which was built around 1450 is a former defence tower of the medieval city wall. St. Nicholas Church was built in 1423-1467 and heavily damaged by bombs in 1945. Reconstruction was started in 1946, interrupted several times and completed in 2013. The City Hall in the Market Place where a statue of Roland can be seen was built in the 14th century. St. Mary's Church with its two towers measuring 84 metres in height was inaugurated in 1447, and its altar dates from 1471. St. Jakobi Church in the northern part of the historical centre was built 1311-1477. St. Petri Church built at the end of the 13th century is the oldest church in Stendal. Breite Straße with many well-preserved medieval houses is the main street of the old city centre.

=== Theatre of the Altmark ===
The area has a theatre named Theater der Altmark. It was founded in 1946 and has always had a particular involvement in youth and children's theatre. Theatrical performances and dance events are staged, as well as concerts, conferences and meetings.

=== Winckelmann Museum ===
The Winckelmann Museum is named after Johann Joachim Winckelmann, the founder of classical archaeology. Its holdings include biographical documents, works, designs and diagrams as well as Greek sculptures or casts, along with other small artworks from antiquity. Since summer 2003 the museum has been the owner of the world's biggest Trojan horse. With its size of 15.60 m high, 13 m long, 9.50 m wide and its weight of 45 tons it offers a beautiful view over Stendal. Exhibitions are held relating to archaeology and the history of art from the 18th and 19th centuries; there is also a modern art museum. The museum is the seat of the Winckelmann-Gesellschaft (the Winckelmann Society). In addition, the museum has exhibits relating to the history and cultural history of the city of Stendal and of the Altmark dating from the prehistoric period through the area's early history right up to the present. There are exhibits pertaining to the Hanseatic League, Romanesque art and local archaeological material.

=== Fire Brigade Museum ===
The town also has the Landesfeuerwehrmuseum (Fire Brigade Museum), showing the development of fire fighting and protection from the leather bucket to modern fire engines.

=== Other ===
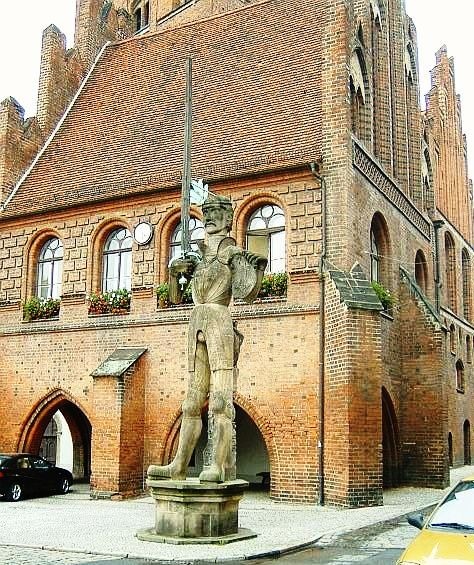
The Roland statue in front of the Town Hall

Stendal is also part of the Altmark cycle path. Information and maps about this cycle path can be had for free from the tourist information office.

== Transportation ==
Stendal station is the most important interchange and rail hub in the north of Saxony-Anhalt. Located on the Berlin–Lehrte railway and the parallel Hanover–Berlin high-speed railway line, it is regularly served by Intercity and Intercity-Express (ICE) trains. Many ICE trains stop in Stendal. Berlin can be reached within 40 minutes and Hanover within 50 minutes.

A direct connection to the German Autobahn network is planned with the extension of the BAB 14 from Magdeburg to Schwerin.

The nearest inland harbour (River Elbe) is in Tangermünde about 15 kms from Stendal.

== Twin towns – sister cities ==
Stendal is twinned with:

- Grenoble, France
- Lemgo, Germany
- Puławy, Poland
- Svitavy, Czech Republic

== People ==
- Johann Joachim Winckelmann (1717–1768), archaeologist and art historian.
- Johann Christian Dieterich (1722–1800), publisher
- Rudolf Dulon (1807–1870), theologian and revolutionary
- Leo August Pochhammer (1841–1920), mathematician
- Otto Schoetensack (1850–1912), paleoanthropologist
- Richard Zeckwer (1850–1922), composer
- Max Ebert (1879–1929), prehistorian and professor
- Irina Korschunow (1925–2013), writer
- Kurt Liebrecht (born 1936), footballer
- Wilfried Klingbiel (born 1939), footballer
- Gerd Gies (born 1943), politician, prime minister of Saxony-Anhalt
- Heinz-Ulrich Walther (born 1943), figure skater
- Carola Hornig (born 1962), rower
- Marcus Faber (born 1984), politician
- Matthias Büttner (born 1990), politician

=== Associated with the town ===
- Stendhal (1783–1842), French writer; he lived near Stendal in 1807–08 as an official of the Napoleonic Kingdom of Westphalia. According to general belief, he used the alias Stendhal from 1817 in homage to Johann Joachim Winckelmann.

=== Honorary citizens ===
- Otto von Bismarck (1815–1898), chancellor, since 1872
- Friedrich Hermann Haacke (1824–1899), physician who dedicated his life to fighting against the cholera epidemics which affected Stendal in the 19th century. The Haacke-Brunnen, a well in the Sperlingsberg quarter, honours him
- Gustav Nachtigal (1834–1885), doctor and explorer in Africa. He is honored with bust at the Gustav Nachtigal Square
