= Dietrich von Hardenberg =

German bishop

The Most Reverend Dietrich von Hardenberg
- Bishop of Brandenburg
- Church: Roman Catholic
- Diocese: Diocese of Brandenburg
- In office: 1521–1526
- Predecessor: Hieronymus Schulz
- Successor: Matthias von Jagow

Personal details
- Born: c. 1465
- Died: 13 May 1526
- Buried: Brandenburg Cathedral

Dietrich von Hardenberg (c. 1465 – 13 May 1526) was bishop of the Diocese of Brandenburg from 1521 to 1526.

== Life ==
Dietrich von Hardenburg was the eldest son of Dietrich II von Hardenberg (d. 1498) and Margaret von Zaldern of the Lindau line of the Hardenberg family. He was the brother of Albrecht von Hardenberg, Heinrich von Hardenberg (d. 1561) and Jasper von Hardenberg (d. 1561).

From 1488, he was a student in Erfurt. On 14 November 1505, he issued a fief letter for Joh. Stekelen. From 31 January 1512, he was canon of Halberstadt in the service of the Brandenburg Elector Joachim I on various diplomatic missions. On 12 March 1513, he witnessed a comparison between Duke Heinrich I of Brunswick and Lüneburg and Count Johann von Holstein-Schaumburg. On 23 April 1517, Elector Joachim I was asked by a Brandenburg diplomat from Matzan to send Dietrich von Hardenberg to France as ambassador to send. In addition to working for the Elector, he was also on various missions for Bishop John IV of Hildesheim. On December 5, 1518, Bishop John IV enfeoffed him with various goods. In the spring of 1519, Dietrich von Hardenberg served twice as an envoy in the service of Elector Joachim I in Cologne, where he was to sound out the political position of Archbishop Hermann V and win him over for the election of King Franz I as emperor. At the end of 1520, he went to the French court on a diplomatic mission together with the provost of Besskow, Andreas Huth. On April 4, 1521, he arrived in Worms from Paris.

On 12 April 1521, the Brandenburg bishop Hieronymus Schulz became the new Bishop of Havelberg, and Dietrich von Hardenberg received the Bishopric of Brandenburg for his services to Elector Joachim I. On 17 May 1521, Pope Leo X transferred the episcopacy to Dietrich von Hardenberg. As bishop he proved himself to be a zealous Catholic and an enemy of the Reformation, which, however, gained a lot of ground under his episcopacy as a result of careless measures, especially in the parts of the Brandenburg diocese outside of the Kurmark territory. It is believed that he died on 13 May 1526. He was buried in Brandenburg Cathedral.

== Literature ==
- Gustav Abb, Gottfried Wentz: The Diocese of Brandenburg. First part. (Germania Sacra AF 1st section, 1st vol.) Berlin, Leipzig, 1929 (online).

Catholic Church titles
Preceded by Hieronymus Schulz	Bishop of Brandenburg; 1521–1526	Succeeded by Matthias von Jagow
