= Berlin Cathedral =

Lutheran church in Berlin

- Berliner Dom
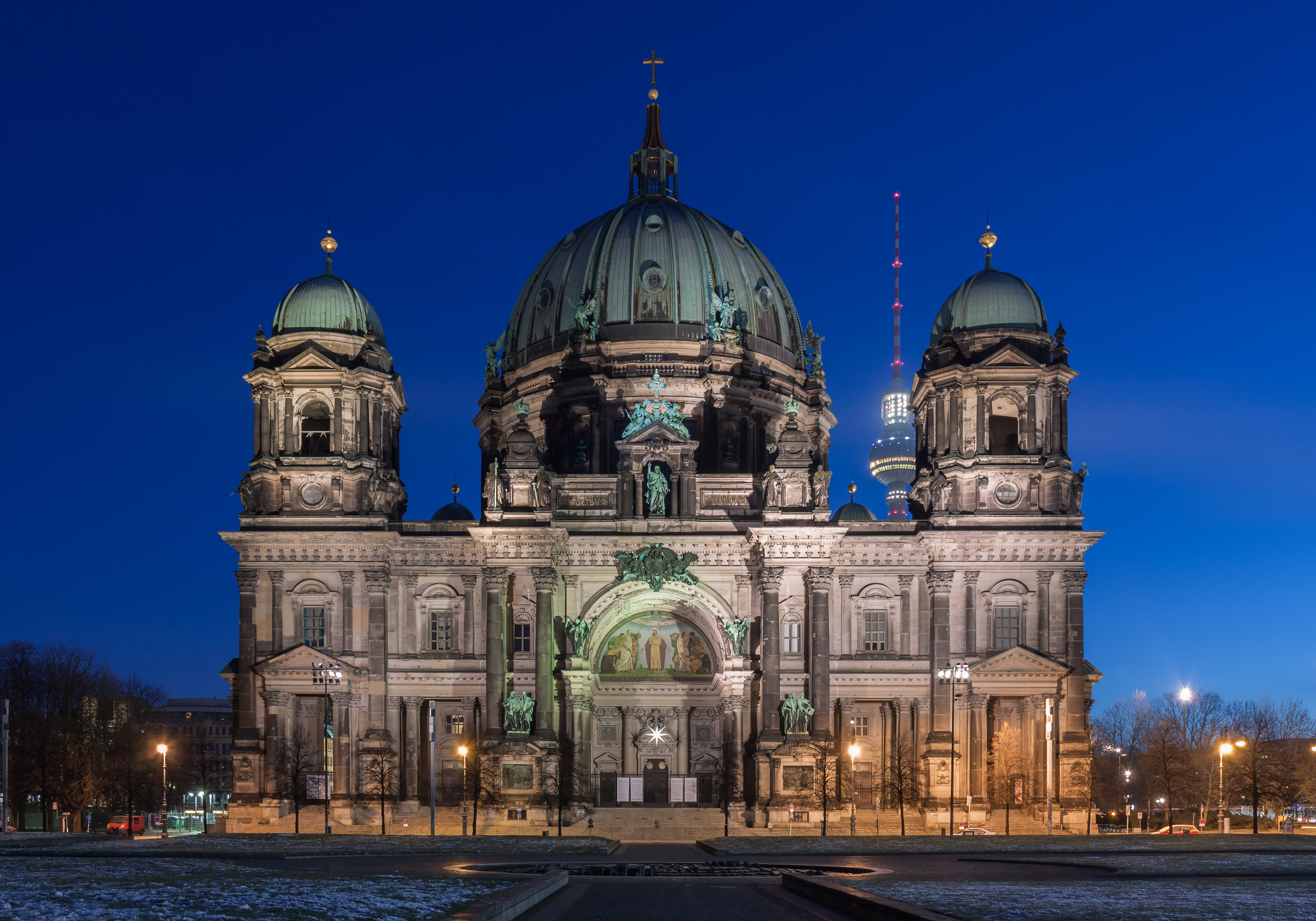
- Berlin Cathedral: Evangelical Supreme Parish and Collegiate Church (2017)

- Location within Central Berlin Location within Germany

Religion
- Affiliation: United (Prussian Union) (1817–present); Reformed (1632–1817); Lutheran (1539–1632); Catholic (until 1539)
- Province: Evangelical Church Berlin - Brandenburg - Silesian Upper Lusatia
- Year consecrated: 1454, as the Catholic St. Erasmus Chapel

Location
- Location: Cölln, a historical neighbourhood of Berlin, Germany
- Coordinates: 52°31′9″N 13°24′4″E

Architecture
- Architects: Martin Böhme (1717); Johann Boumann the Elder (1747–1750); Karl Friedrich Schinkel (1817 and 1820–1822); Julius Raschdorff and Otto Raschdorff, father and son (1894–1905)
- Style: Renaissance (until 1538); Brick Gothic (1538–1747); Baroque (1747–1817/1822); Neoclassical (1817–1893); Neo-Renaissance, since 1905
- Completed: 1451 (first building); 1538 (2nd bldg); 1750 (3rd bldg); 1905 (4th bldg); 1993 reinaugurated after removal of war destructions
- Construction cost: 11.5 million marks (1905)

Specifications
- Direction of façade: west
- Length: 114 metres (374 ft), shorter since the demolition of the northern memorial hall in 1975
- Width: 74 metres (243 ft)
- Dome height (outer): 115 metres (377 ft) (until destruction 1944)
- Materials: originally brick, since 1905, Silesian sandstone

Website
- www.berliner-dom.de

Berlin Cathedral bells ringing

Berlin Cathedral (German: Berliner Dom), also known as the Evangelical Supreme Parish and Collegiate Church, is a monumental German Protestant church and dynastic tomb (House of Hohenzollern) at the Lustgarten on the Museum Island in central Berlin. Having its origins as a castle chapel for the Berlin Palace, several structures have served to house the church since the 15th century. The present collegiate church was built from 1894 to 1905 by order of Emperor William II according to plans by Julius Raschdorff in Renaissance and Baroque Revival styles. The listed building is the largest Protestant church in Germany and one of the most important dynastic tombs in Europe. In addition to church services, the cathedral is used for state ceremonies, concerts and other events.

Since the demolition of the Memorial Church (Denkmalskirche) section on the north side by the East German authorities in 1975, Berlin Cathedral has consisted of the large Sermon Church (Predigerkirche) in the center, and the smaller Baptismal and Matrimonial Church (Tauf- und Traukirche) on the south side and the Hohenzollern crypt (Hohenzollerngruft), which covers almost the entire basement. Damaged during the Allied bombing in World War II, the cathedral's original interior was restored by 2002. Currently there is discussion about restoring the historical exterior as well.

== Term ==
Berlin Cathedral (German: Berliner Dom) is the common name for the Supreme Parish and Collegiate Church (German: Oberpfarr- und Domkirche zu Berlin) in Berlin, Germany.

The Dom is the parish church of the congregation Gemeinde der Oberpfarr- und Domkirche zu Berlin, a member of the umbrella organisation Evangelical Church of Berlin-Brandenburg-Silesian Upper Lusatia. The term Dom denotes a collegiate church (equivalent to the Italian duomo, or the English "Minster"); however, as most cathedrals are also collegiate churches, the term "Dom" has become the common term for a cathedral in German, though they are not synonymous. Berlin Cathedral has never been a cathedral in the actual sense of that term since it has never been the seat of a bishop. The bishop of the Evangelical Church in Berlin-Brandenburg (under this name 1945–2003) is based at St. Mary's Church and Kaiser Wilhelm Memorial Church in Berlin.

== History ==
Berlin Cathedral has a long history starting as a Catholic place of worship in the 15th century.

=== Establishment of a Collegiate Church in Berlin (1451–1536) ===
The history of today's Supreme Parish and Collegiate Church and its community dates back to 1451. In that year Prince-Elector Frederick II Irontooth of Brandenburg moved with his residence from Brandenburg upon Havel to Cölln (today's Fishers' Island, the southern part of Museums Island) into the newly erected City Palace, which also housed a Catholic chapel. In 1454 Frederick Irontooth, after having returned – via Rome – from his pilgrimage to Jerusalem, elevated the chapel to become a parish church, richly endowing it with relics and altars. Pope Nicholas V ordered Stephan Bodecker, then Prince-Bishop of Brandenburg, to consecrate the chapel to Erasmus of Formiae.

On 7 April 1465 – at Frederick Irontooth's request – Pope Paul II attributed to St Erasmus Chapel a canon-law College named Stift zu Ehren Unserer Lieben Frauen, des heiligen Kreuzes, St. Petri und Pauli, St. Erasmi und St. Nicolai dedicated to Mary(am) of Nazareth, the Holy Cross, Simon Peter, Paul of Tarsus, Erasmus of Formiae, and Nicholas of Myra. A collegiate church is a church endowed with revenues and earning estates, in order to provide a number of canons, called in canon law a College, with prebends. In this respect a collegiate church is similar to a cathedral, which is why in colloquial German the term cathedral college (Domstift), became the synecdoche used – pars pro toto – for all canon-law colleges. So the college of St. Erasmus' chapel, called Domstift in German, bestowed the pertaining church its colloquial naming, Domkirche (cathedral church). Frederick Irontooth provided the college with estates, sufficient to supply eight canon prebendaries. On 20 January 1469, Dietrich IV, then Prince-Bishop of Brandenburg, invested eight clergymen, chosen by Frederick Irontooth, as collegiate canons with the prebends.

=== The Collegiate Church in the former Black Friars' Church of St. Paul's south of the Palace (1536–1747) ===
In 1535, Prince-Elector Joachim II Hector reached the consent of Pope Paul III to shut down the 1297-founded Dominican convent (Black Friars), southerly neighboured to the palace, to acquire the pertaining monastic St. Paul's Church, built c. in 1345. On 28 May 1536, most of the Black Friars moved to a Dominican monastery in Brandenburg upon Havel. Joachim II Hector assigned the thus void, three-nave church building to the Collegiate Church of Our Lady, the Holy Cross, the Ss. Peter, Paul, Erasmus and Nicholas and enlarged the College to 12 prebendaries, bestowing two of them to canons taken on from the Dominican convent.

In 1538, a new western façade with two towers was attached to the collegiate church, which – due to its prior status as a church of a mendicant order – had no tower before. In the next year, Joachim II Hector converted from Catholicism to Lutheranism, as many of his subjects had done earlier. The collegiate church thus became Lutheran too, like most of the electoral subjects and all the churches in the Electorate. However, Joachim II Hector's ideas of Reformation were different from the modern ones. After his conversion he enriched the collegiate church with luxuriant furnishings, such as paraments, monstrances, relics, chasubles, carpets and antependia. From 1545 on the electoral family of Hohenzollern used the church building as their burial place.

In 1608, the year of his accession to the throne, Prince-Elector John Sigismund, then a crypto-Calvinist, dissolved the college and the church was renamed into Supreme Parish Church of Holy Trinity in Cölln. In 1613, John Sigismund publicly confessed his Calvinist faith (in Germany usually called Reformed Church), but waived his privilege to demand the same of his subjects (Cuius regio, eius religio). So he and his family, except his steadfastly Lutheran wife Anna, converted, while most of his subjects remained Lutherans. While Berlin's other churches, subject to Lutheran city-council jurisdiction, remained Lutheran, the Supreme Parish Church of Holy Trinity, the Hohenzollern's house church, became Berlin's first, and until 1695, only Calvinist church, serving from 1632 on as the parish for all Calvinists in town. Being now a Calvinist church, the patronage of the Holy Trinity was increasingly skipped.

In 1667, the dilapidated double-tower façade was torn down and in 1717 Martin Böhme erected a new Baroque façade with two towers. With the effect of 1 January 1710, Cölln was united with Berlin under the latter name. In 1747, the Supreme Parish Church was completely demolished to clear space for the baroque extension of Berlin Palace.

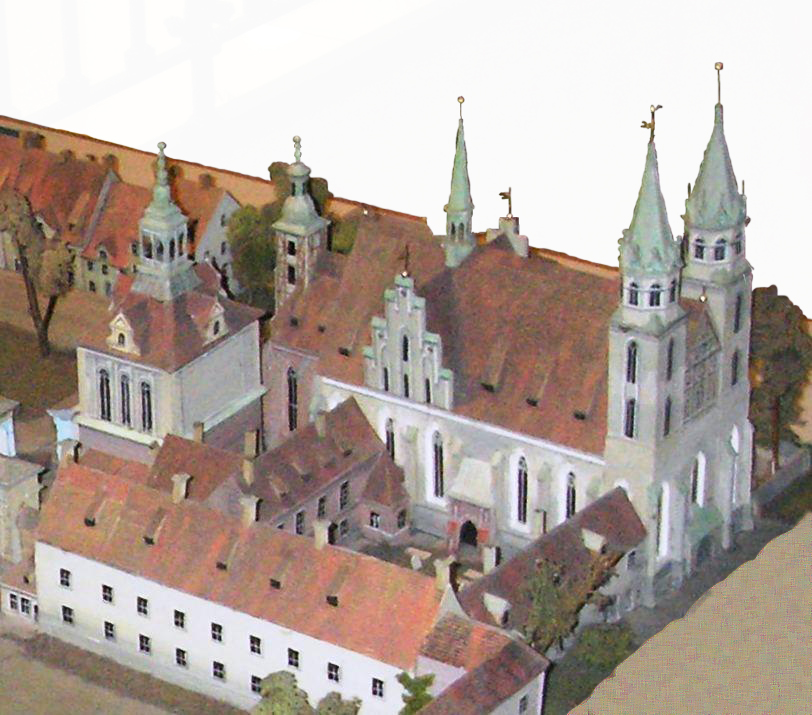
The Supreme Parish Church with its double-tower façade of 1538 with northerly adjacent parts of Berlin's Palace. Miniature shown in the present church building.

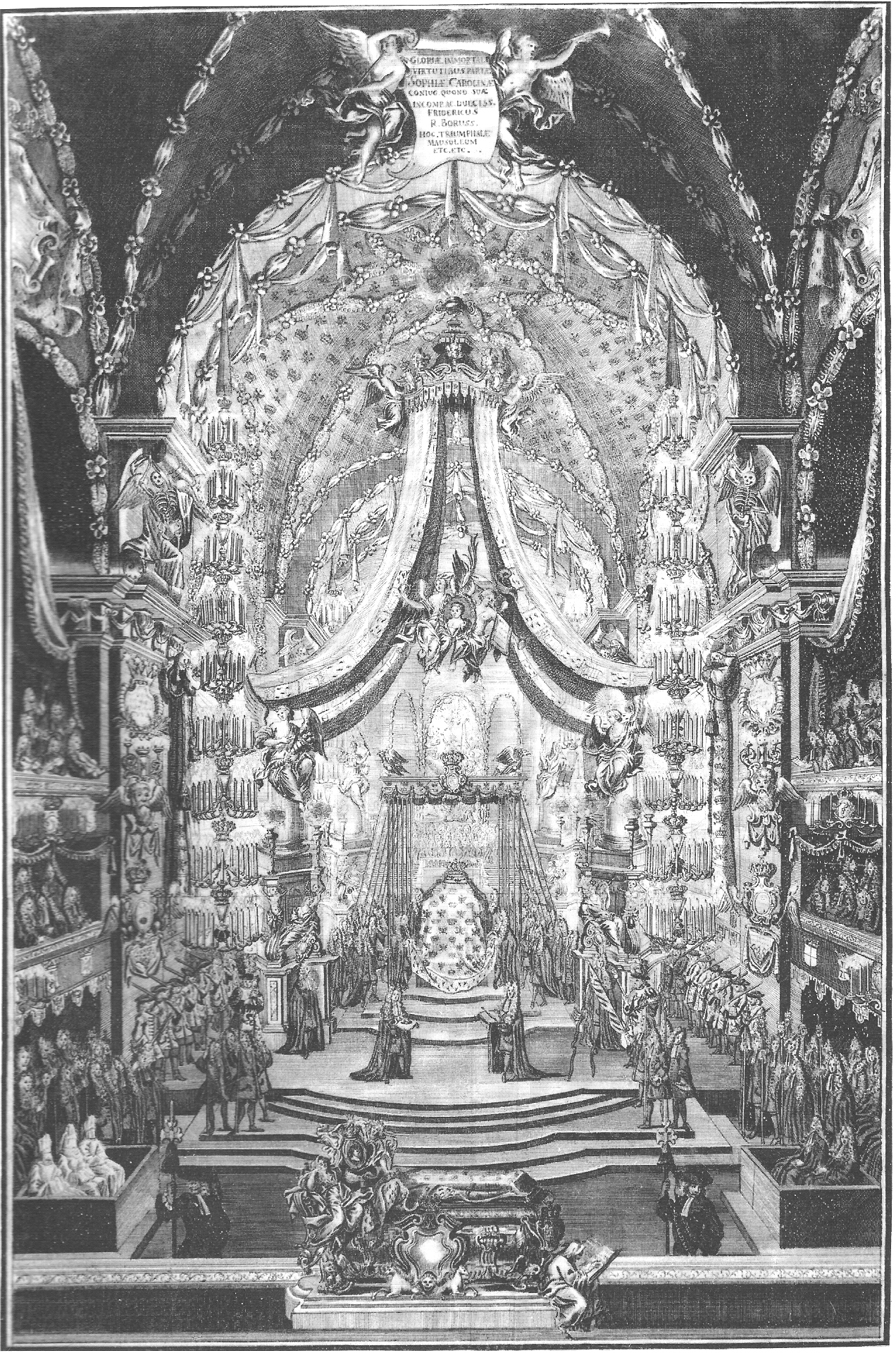
View of the interior of the Supreme Parish Church in 1705 (the only known graphic with this view)

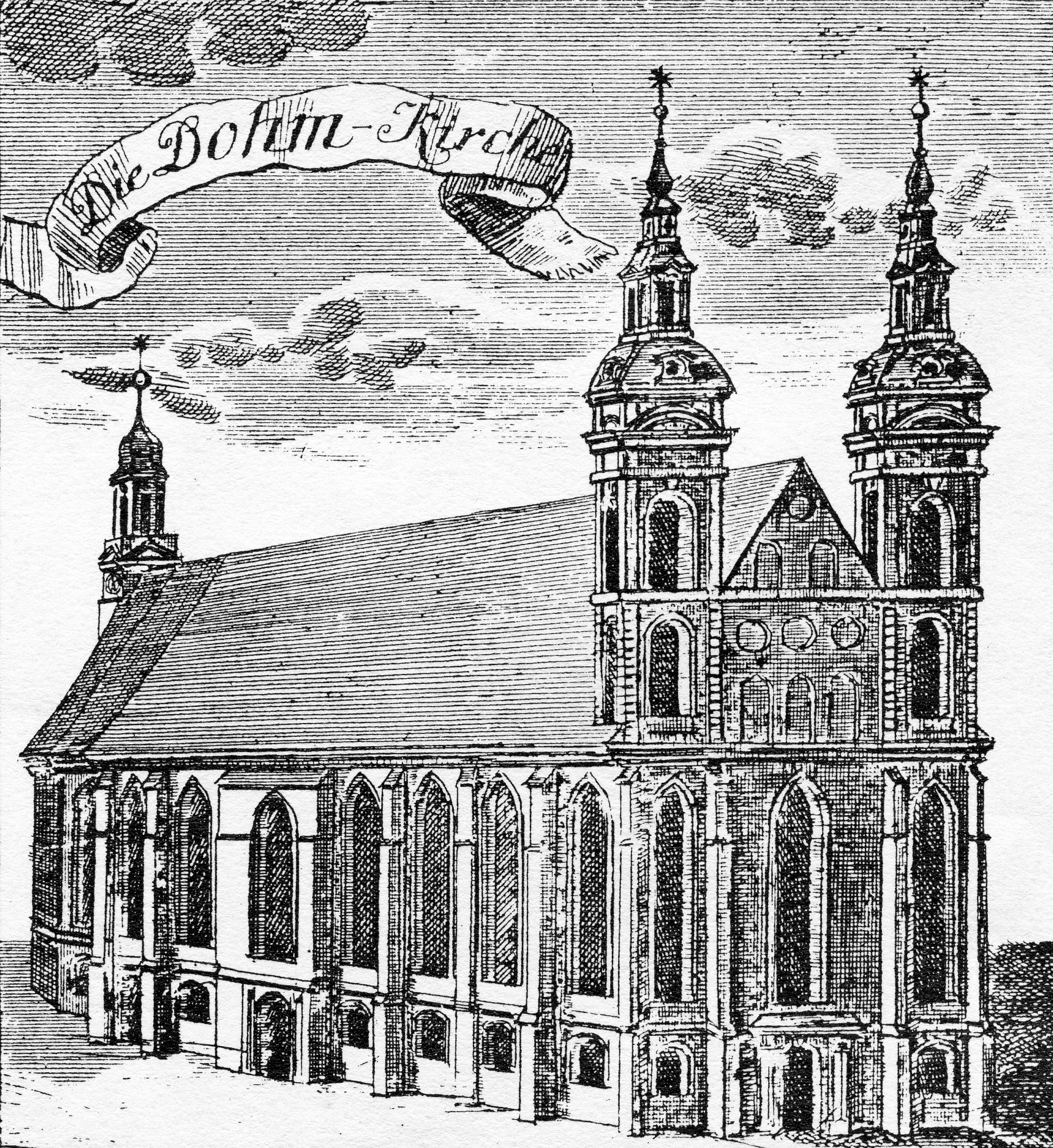
The Supreme Parish Church in 1736 with its new towers

=== The Supreme Parish Church in its new Building north of the Palace (1750–1893) ===
On 6 September 1750, the new baroque Calvinist Supreme Parish Church was inaugurated, built by Johann Boumann the Elder in 1747–1750. The electoral tombs were transferred to the new building. The new structure covered a space north of the palace, which is still covered by the present building.

In 1817, under the auspices of King Frederick William III of Prussia, the community of the Supreme Parish Church, like most Prussian Calvinist and Lutheran congregations joined the common umbrella organization named Evangelical Church in Prussia (under this name since 1821), with each congregation maintaining its former denomination or adopting the new united denomination. The community of the Supreme Parish Church adopted the new denomination of the Prussian Union. Today's presbytery of the congregation bears the unusual name in German: Domkirchenkollegium, literally Cathedral College, thus recalling the history of the church as a collegiate church.

In celebration of the Union Karl Friedrich Schinkel remodeled the interior in the same year and in 1820–1822 the exterior of Boumann's church in the neoclassicist style. The Supreme Parish and Cathedral Church faced at its southern façade Berlin City Palace, the residence of the Hohenzollerns (severely damaged in World War II and demolished later by the East German government, later reconstructed as Humboldt Forum), and the Lustgarten park at its western front, which is still there.

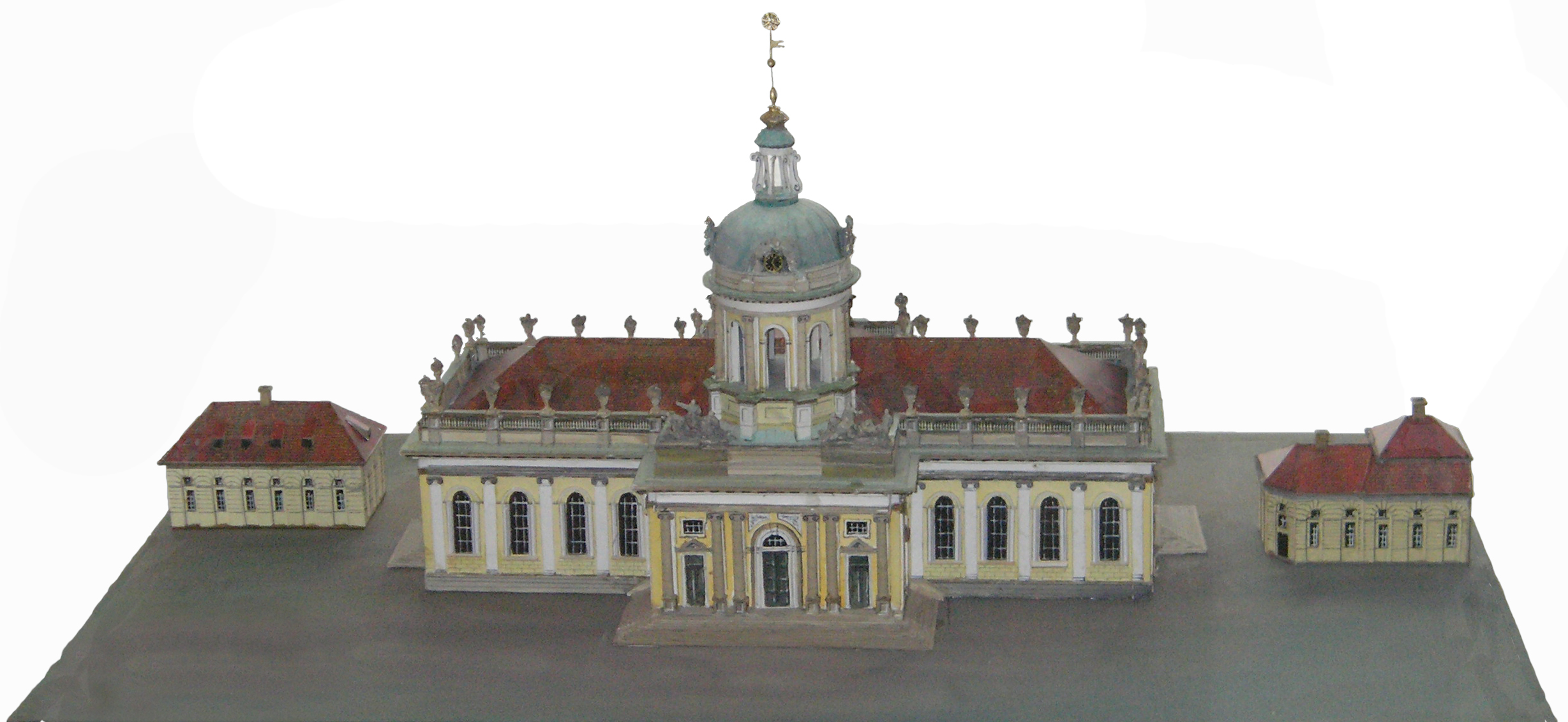
Miniature of the Supreme Parish Church in Berlin, as built by J. Boumann the Elder in 1750

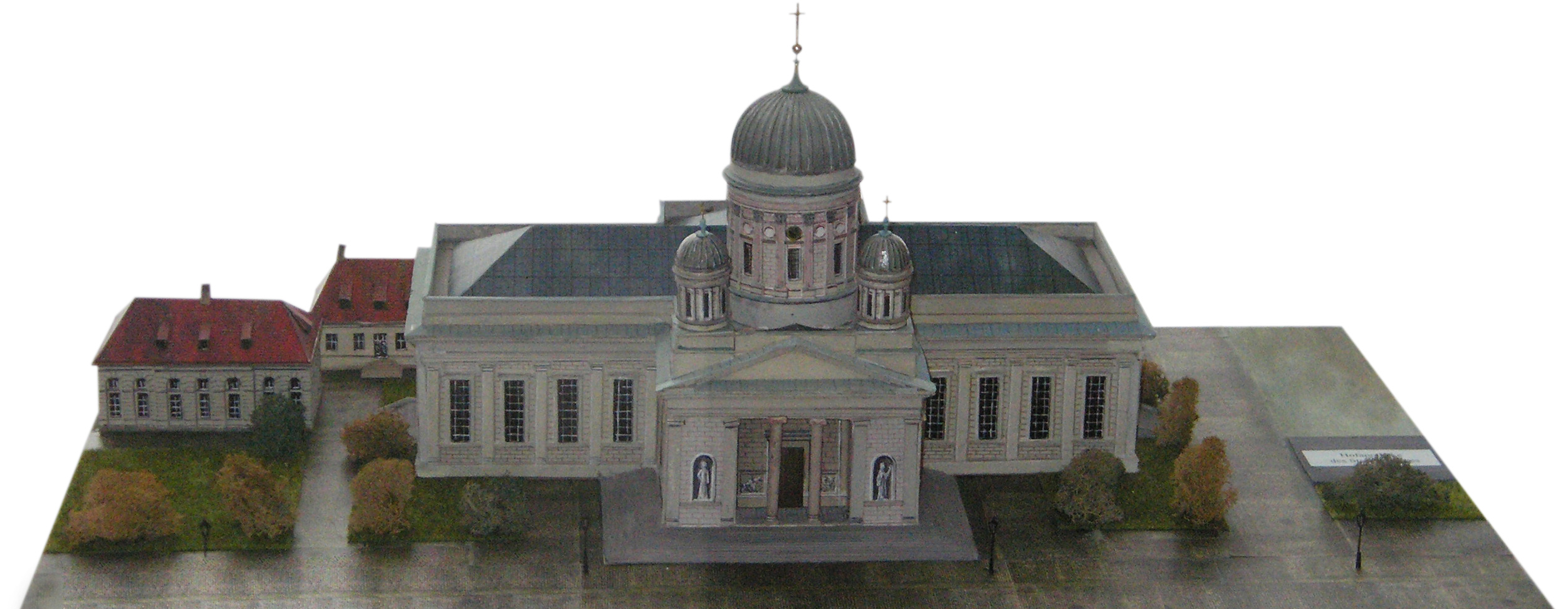
The Supreme Parish Church after Schinkel's remodelling, c. 1830

=== Modern Berlin Cathedral (1893–present) ===
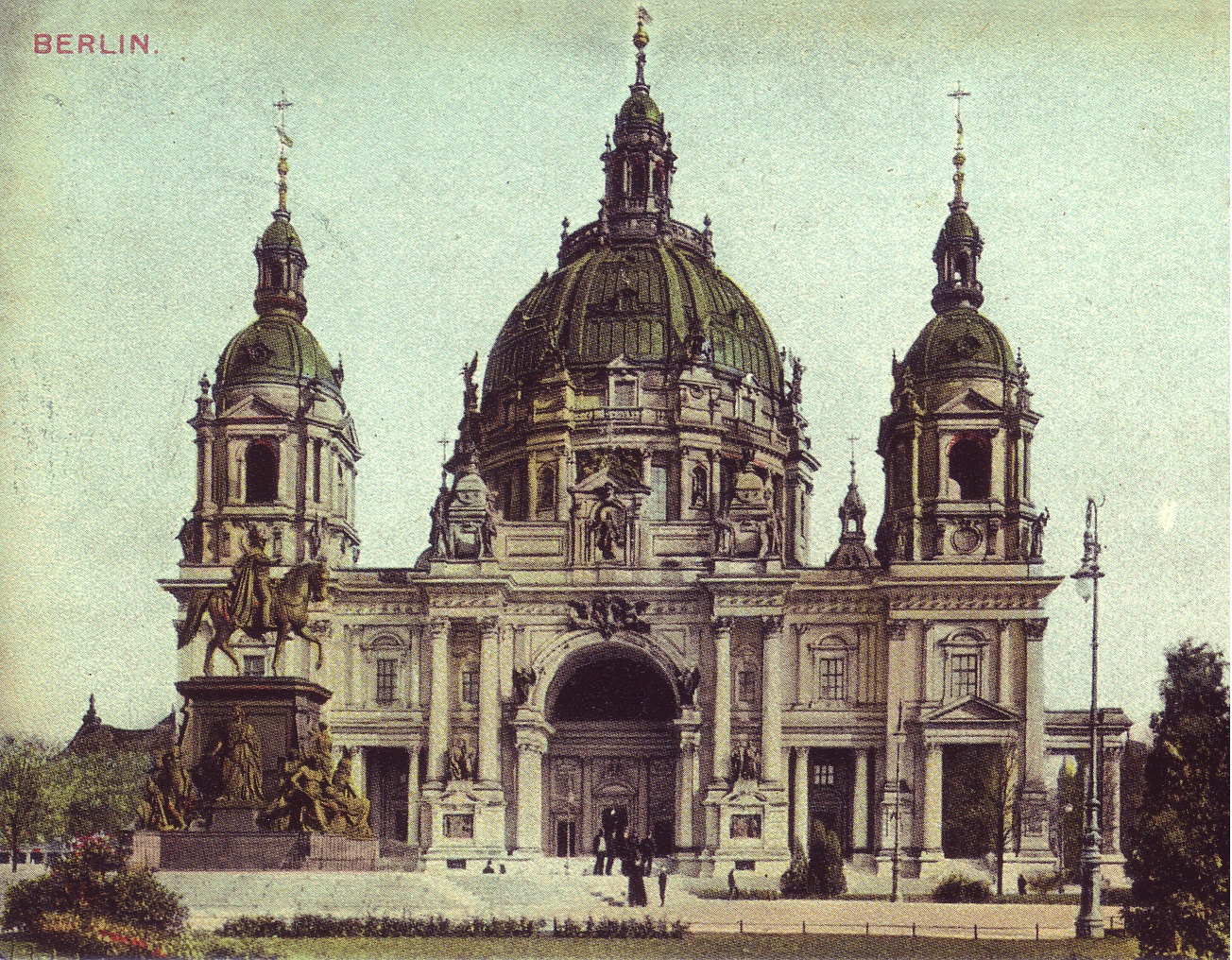
Berlin Cathedral from the Lustgarten (c. 1900)

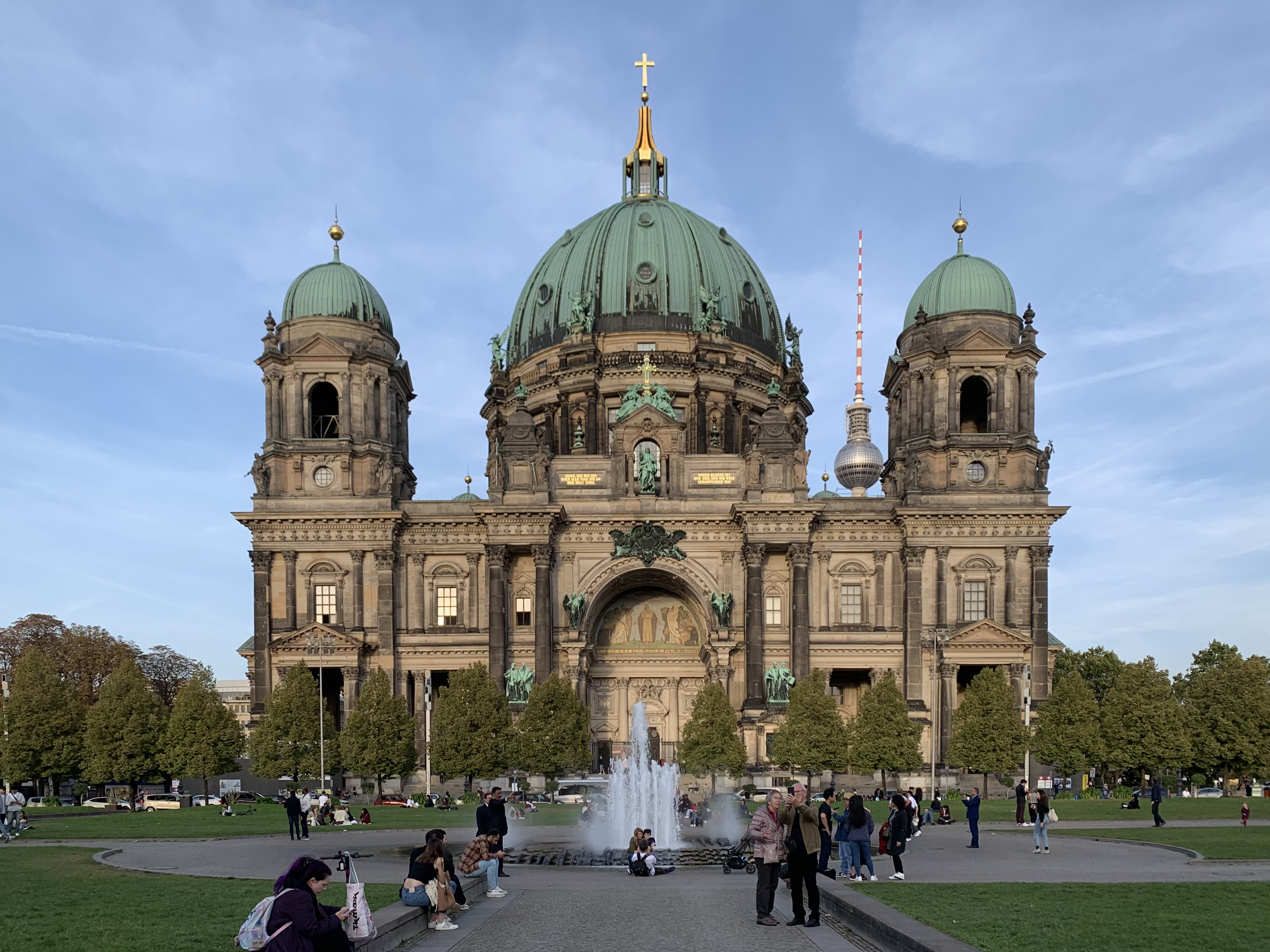
Berlin Cathedral with simplified design (2023)

However, in the 19th century, a new building was under discussion, but the post-Napoleonic poverty made its realization impossible. After dismantling the movable interior (altar, paintings, sarcophagi), Boumann's building was demolished in 1893 and Julius and Otto Raschdorff, father and son, built the present Supreme Parish and Cathedral Church in exuberant forms of high Neo-Renaissance style.

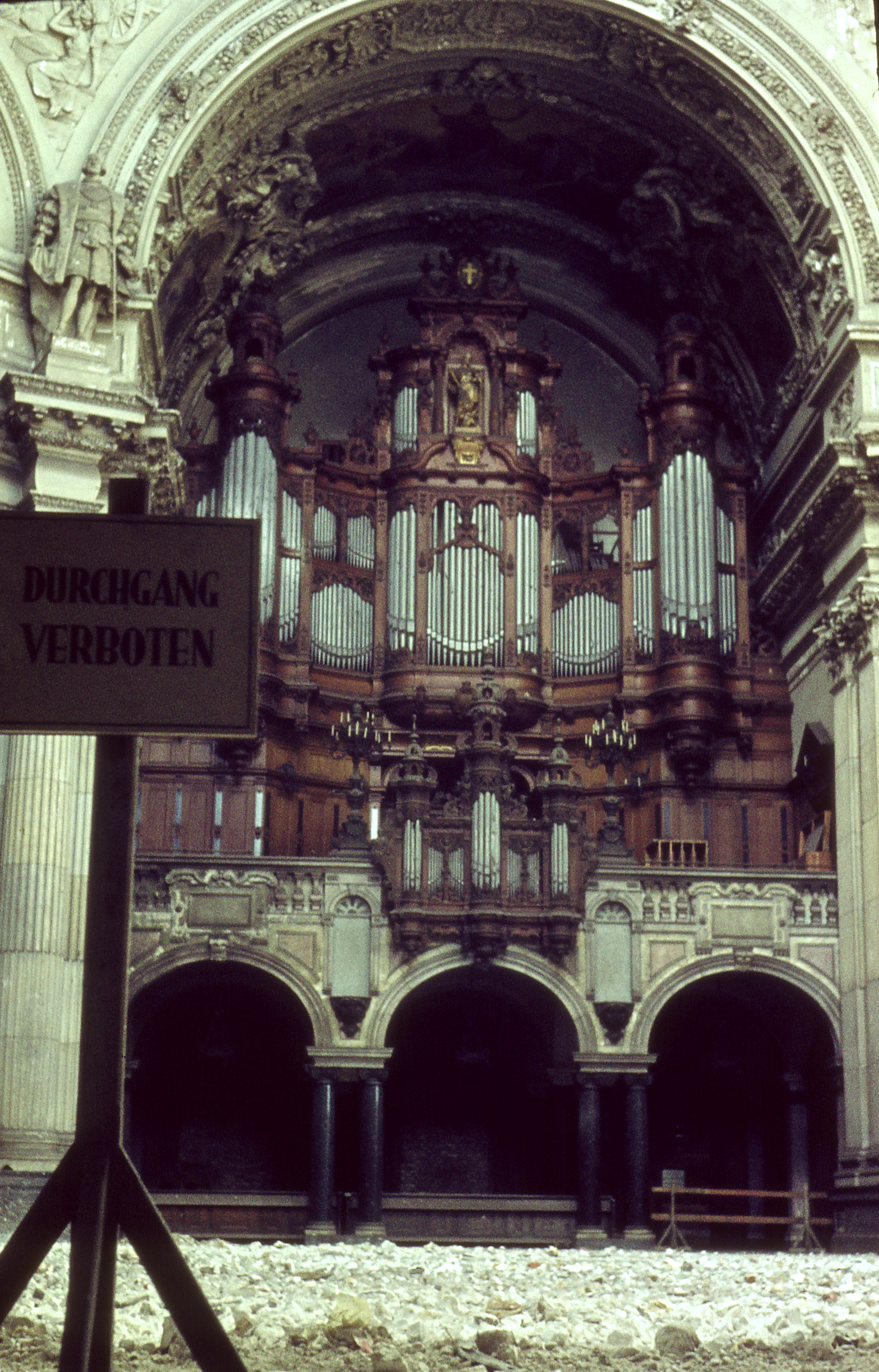
The organ in 1964 – on the floor the rubble of the dome, destroyed in an Allied bombing 1944

With no separation of Protestant church and state of Prussia, Wilhelm II officiated as the summus episcopus (Supreme Governor of the Evangelical State Church of Prussia's older Provinces, as it was named since 1875) and the state paid the complete construction cost of 11.5 million Marks. At 114 metres (374 ft) long, 73 metres (240 ft) wide and 116 metres (381 ft) tall, it was much larger than any of the previous buildings and was considered a Protestant counterweight to St. Peter's Basilica in Vatican City. On 27 February 1905, the present building was inaugurated.

In 1940, the blast waves of Allied bombing blew away part of the windows. On 24 May 1944, a bomb of combustible liquids entered the roof lantern of the dome. The fire could not be extinguished at that unreachable section of the dome. So the lantern burnt and collapsed into the main floor. Between 1949 and 1953, a temporary roof was built to enclose the building. On 9 May 1967 the then still undivided Evangelical Church of the Union decided a committee for the reconstruction of the Supreme Parish and Cathedral Church, then located in East Berlin. The government of the Eastern German Democratic Republic did not oppose the work of the committee due to the concomitant inflow of Deutsche Marks.

In 1975, reconstruction started, simplifying the building's original design and demolishing the north wing, the 'Denkmalskirche' – Memorial Church. Compared by some to the Medici Chapel, it had survived the war completely intact but was demolished for ideological reasons by the communist government due to it being a hall of honour for the Hohenzollern dynasty. This resulted in scaffolding for restoration appearing on the church while detonation charges were applied to its undamaged rear. The government also demanded the removal of as many crosses as possible. The demolition and redesign cost 800,000 marks, while the restoration (done on the cheap) cost just 50,000 marks. The Berlin Cathedral Building Society now seek to rebuild the Denkmalskirche.

In 1980, the baptistery and wedding church reopened for services. The restoration of the nave began in 1984. On 6 June 1993, the nave was re-inaugurated in an event attended by Federal Chancellor Helmut Kohl and televised nationwide in Germany. There has been discussion to restore the dome and surrounding cupolas to their original appearance, but this has not occurred due to a lack of funds.

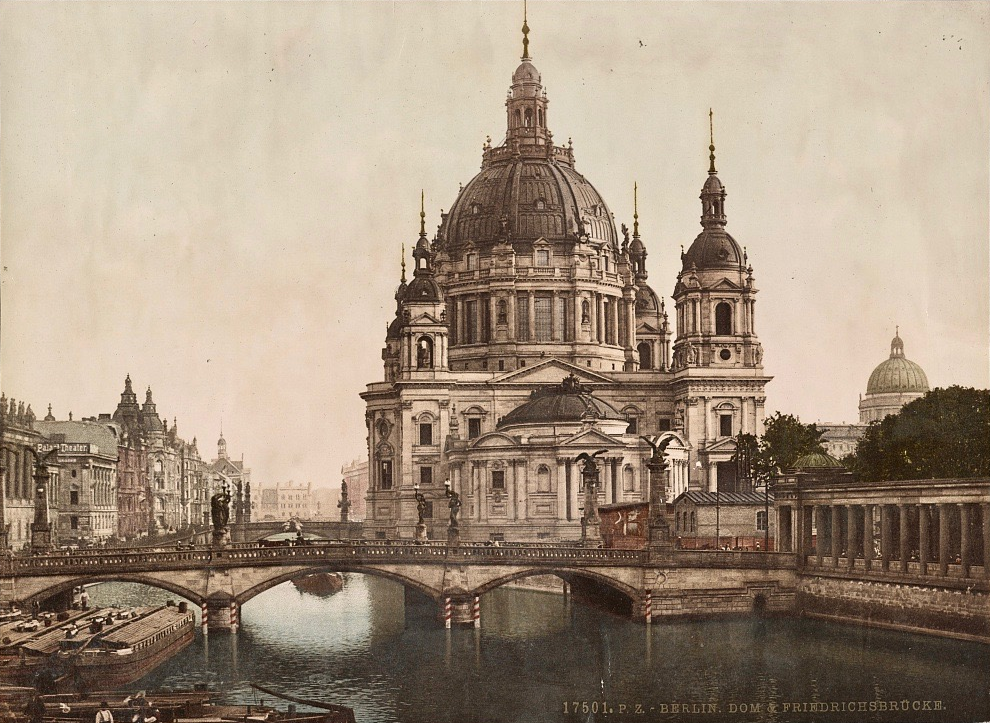
Berlin Cathedral with the northern wing 'Denkmalskirche' – Memorial Church, and the Berlin Palace in the background (c. 1900)

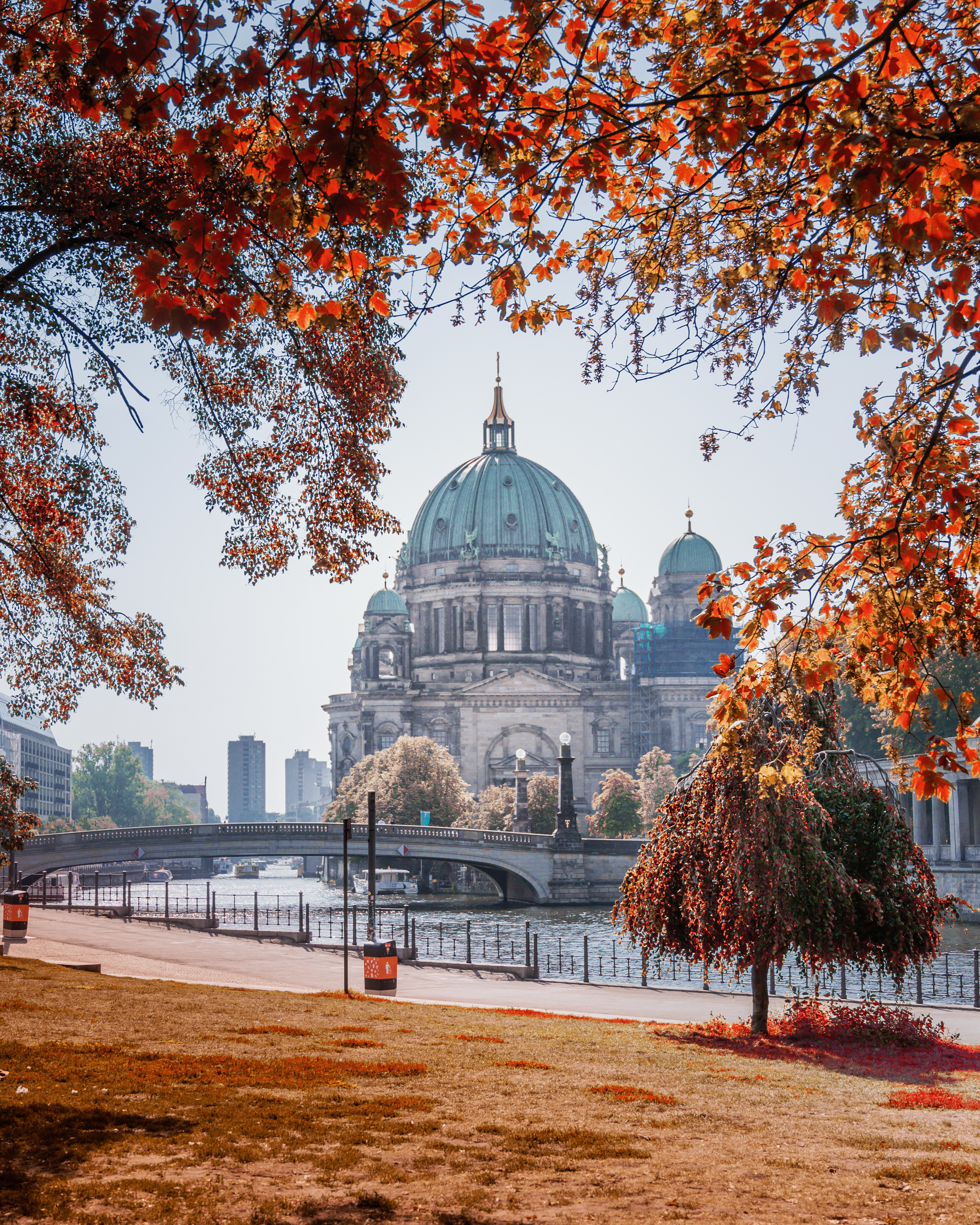
Berlin Cathedral without the northern wing (2019)

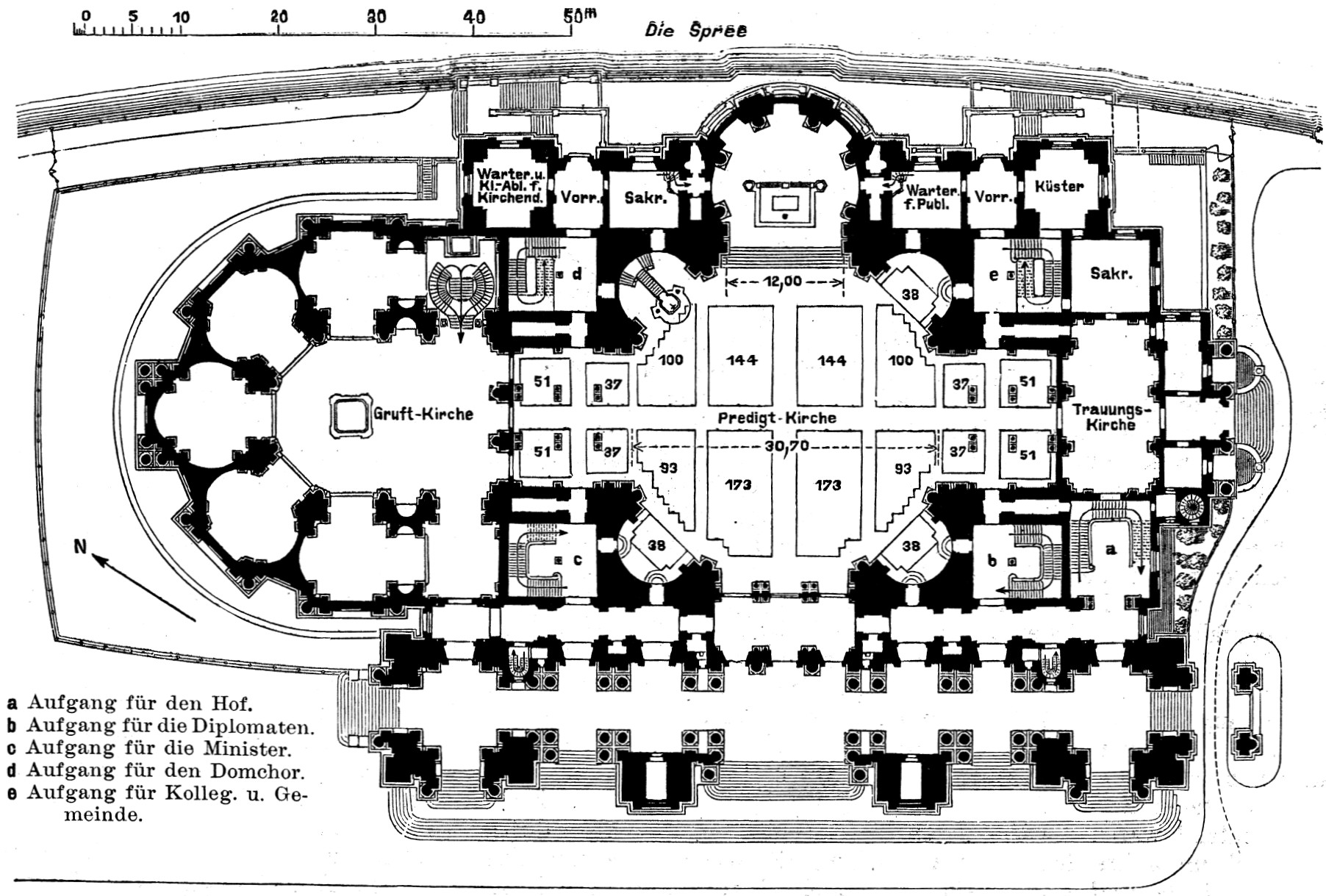
Floor plan of the Cathedral with the now demolished northern wing (on the left)

The reconstructed dome, 2026

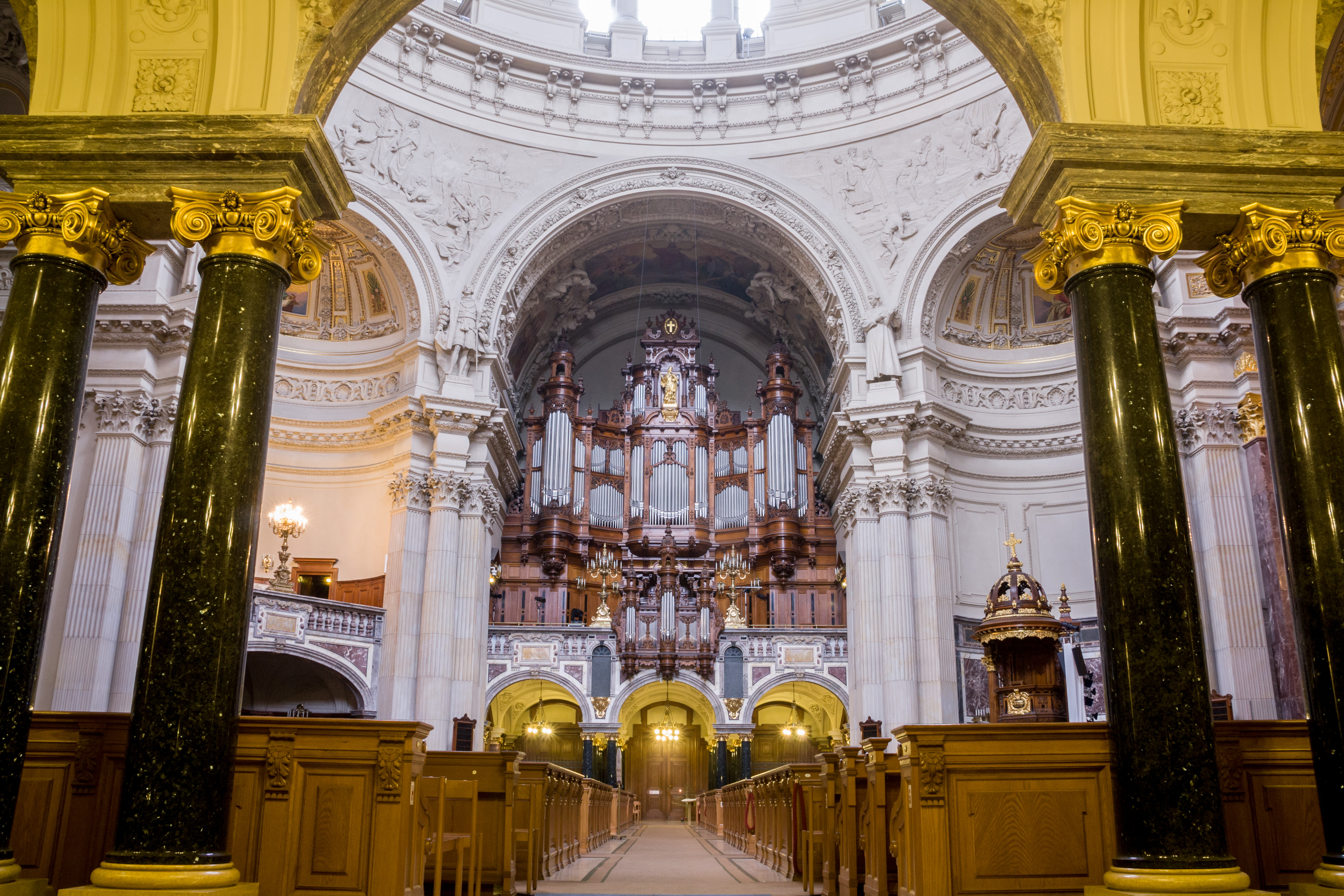
View into the church, 2013

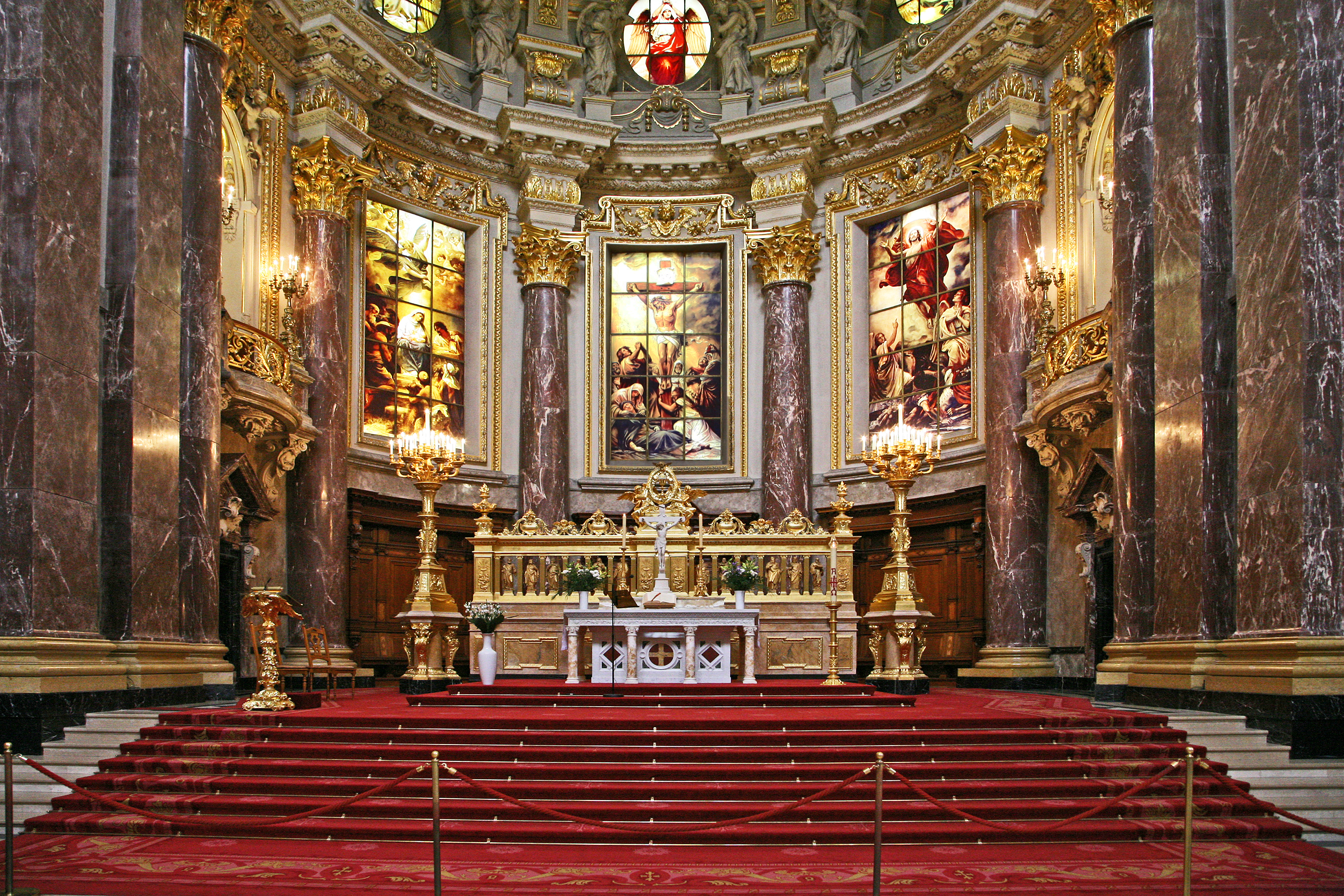
The altar, 2010

The entrance portal, 2017

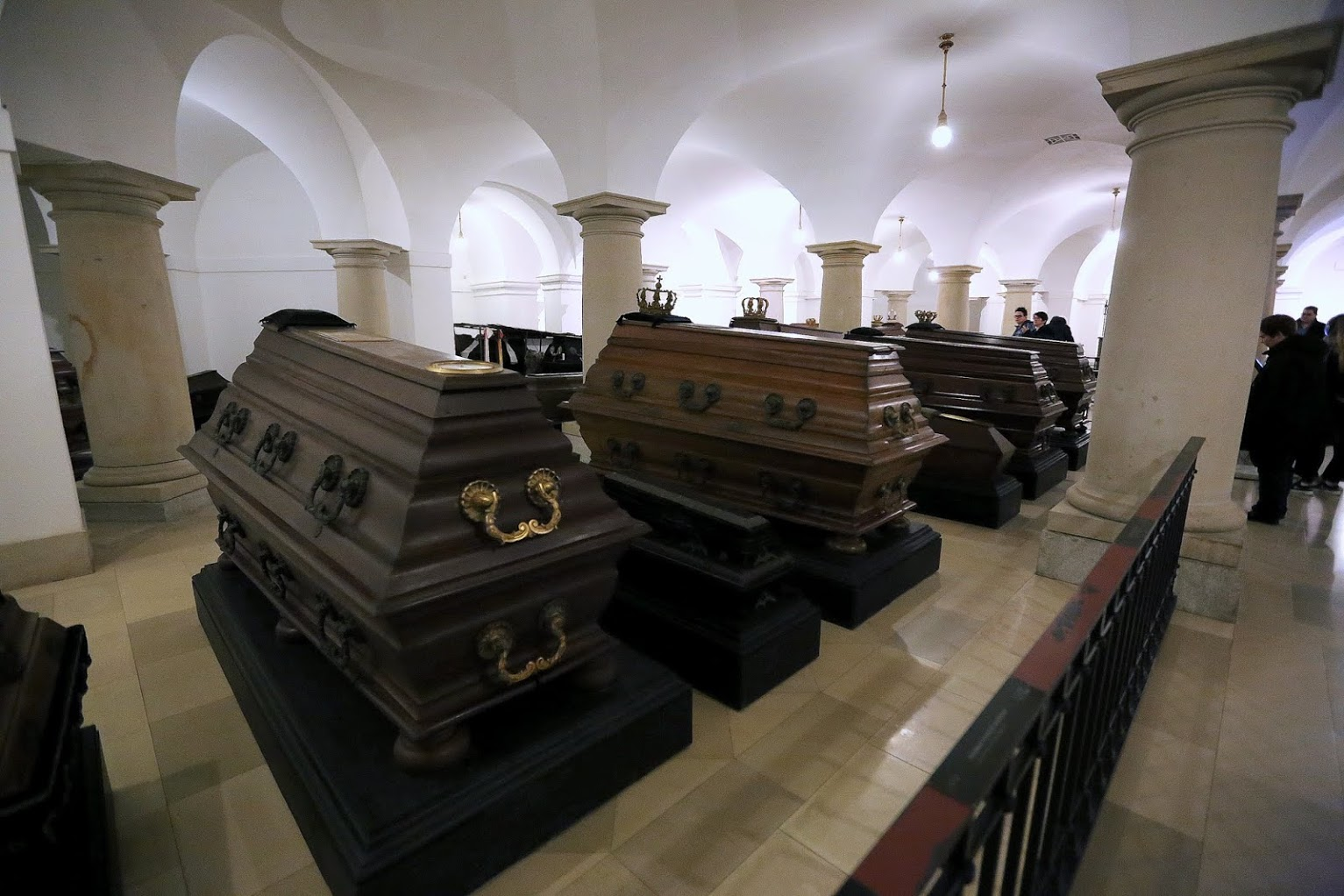
Hohenzollern crypt (Hohenzollerngruft), 2016

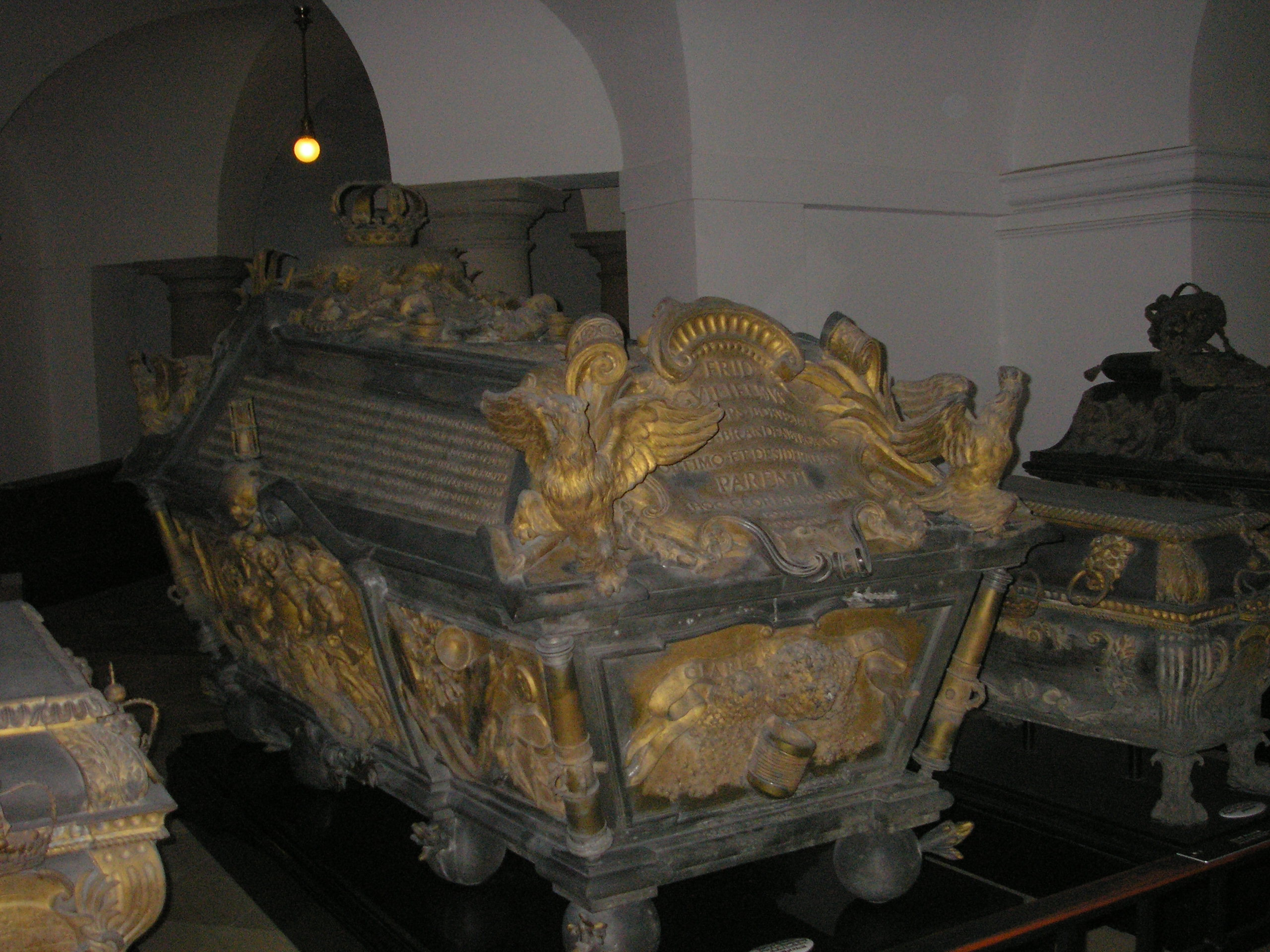
The sarcophagus of Margrave Philipp Wilhelm von Brandenburg-Schwedt, 2006
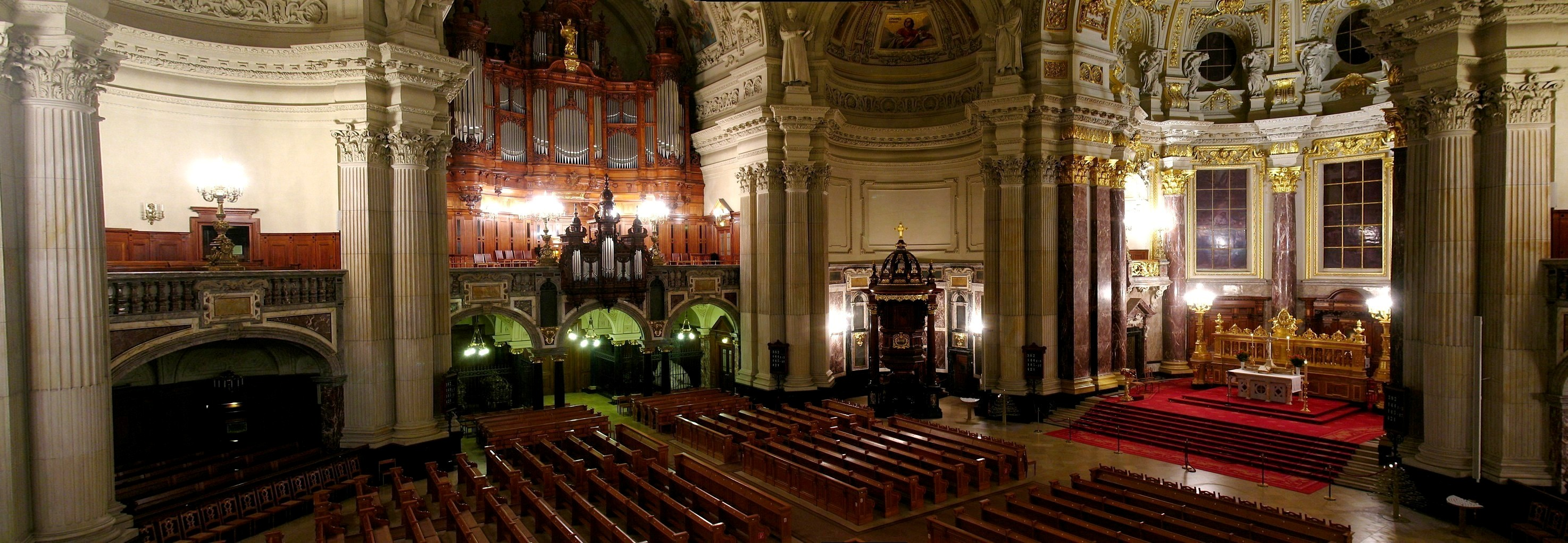
Inside Berlin Cathedral at night

== Music ==
"SIEHE, ICH BIN BEI EUCH ALLE TAGE BIS AN DER WELT ENDE."
("SEE, I WILL BE BY YOU ALL THE DAYS UNTIL THE END OF THE WORLD.")

— Biblical sentence (Matthew 28:20) above the main entrance to Berlin Cathedral (on the left)

=== Main organ ===
"UNSER GLAUBE IST DER SIEG, DER DIE WELT UEBERWUNDEN HAT."
("OUR FAITH IS THE VICTORY THAT CONQUERED THE WORLD.")

— Biblical sentence (1 John 5:4) above the main entrance to Berlin Cathedral (on the right)

The pipe organ, built by Wilhelm Sauer, was fully restored during reconstruction. It has 113 stops, including three ranks of 32' pipes on the pedal division, played by a 4-manual console:

I Hauptwerk C–a^{3}
Prinzipal	16'
Majorbaß	16'
Prinzipal	8'
Prinzipal amabile	8'
Doppelflöte	8'
Flûte harmonique	8'
Bordun	8'
Quintatön	8'
Viola di Gamba	8'
Gemshorn	8'
Harmonika	8'
Gedacktquinte	5^{1}/_{3}′
Oktave	4'
Flûte octaviante	4'
Fugara	4'
Rohrflöte	4'
Oktave	2'
Rauschquinte II
Grosscymbel III
Scharff III–V
Kornett III–IV
Bombarde	16'
Trompete	8'
Clairon	4'

II Brustwerk C–a^{3}
Prinzipal	16'
Quintatön	16'
Prinzipal	8'
Geigenprinzipal	8'
Doppelflöte	8'
Spitzflöte	8'
Soloflöte	8'
Rohrflöte	8'
Salicional	8'
Dulciana	8'
Oktave	4'
Spitzflöte	4'
Flauto Dolce	4'
Salicional	4'
Quinte	2^{2}/_{3}′
Piccolo	2'
Mixtur IV
Cymbel III
Kornett III
Tuba	8'
Klarinette	8'

III Schwellwerk C–a^{3}

Salicional
16'
Bordun
16'
Prinzipal
8'
Schalmei
8'
Hohlflöte
8'
Konzertflöte
8'
Gedeckt
8'
Gemshorn
8'
Unda maris
8'
Dolce
8'
Oktave
4'
Quintatön
4'
Traversflöte
4'
Gemshorn
4'
Nasard
2^{2}/_{3}′
Waldflöte
2'
Terz
1^{3}/_{5}′
Mixtur III
Trompete
8'
Cor anglais
8'
Glockenspiel

Rückpositiv

Flötenprinzipal
8'
Flöte
8'
Gedackt
8'
Dulciana
8'
Zartflöte
4'

IV Schwellwerk C–a^{3}
Lieblich Gedackt	16'
Prinzipal	8'
Traversflöte	8'
Spitzflöte	8'
Lieblich Gedackt	8'
Quintatön	8'
Aeoline	8'
Voix céleste	8'
Prestant	4'
Fernflöte	4'
Violine	4'
Gemshornquinte	2^{2}/_{3}′
Flautino	2'
Harmonia aetheria III
Trompete	8'
Oboe	8'
Vox Humana	8'
Tremolo zu Vox humana

Pedal C–f^{1}
Prinzipal	32'
Untersatz	32'
Prinzipal	16'
Offenbaß	16'
Violon	16'
Subbaß	16'
Gemshorn	16'
Lieblich Gedackt	16'
Quintbaß	10^{2}/_{3}′
Prinzipal	8'
Flötenbaß	8'
Violoncello	8'
Gedackt	8'
Dulciana	8'
Quinte	5^{1}/_{3}′
Oktave	4'
Terz	3^{1}/_{5}′
Quinte	2^{2}/_{3}′
Septime	2^{2}/_{7}′
Oktave	2'
Kontraposaune	32'
Posaune	16'
Fagott	16'
Trompete	8'
Clairon	4'

- II/I, III/I, IV/I, Super I, III/II, IV/II, Super II, IV/III, I/P, II/P, III/P, IV/P
- 3 Freie Kombinationen, Mezzoforte, Forte, Tutti, Rohrwerke, Jalousieschweller III. Manual, Jalousieschweller IV. Manual, Jalousieschweller Vox humana, Handregister ab, Rückpositiv ab.

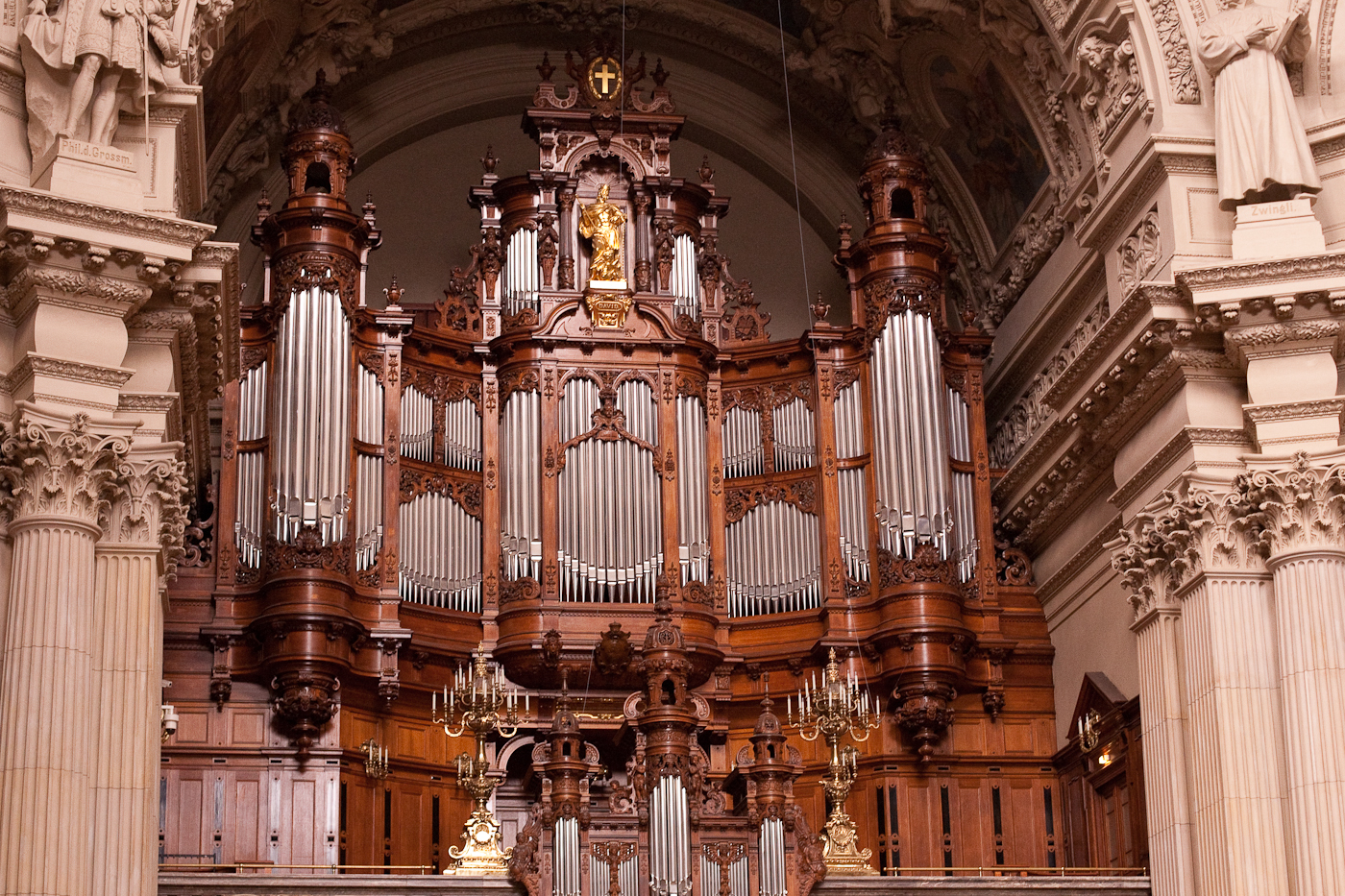
Sauer organ

=== Ensembles ===
Contributing to the cathedral's comprehensive concert programme is their own set of choirs (Berliner Domkantorei) and a brass ensemble (Berliner Dombläser). Berlin Cathedral is also the main place of activity for the renowned boys' choir Staats- und Domchor Berlin, an institution of the Berlin University of the Arts. Since Advent 2015, The English Choir Berlin, a multinational SATB adult choir, sings Choral Evensong (Domvesper in anglikanisher Tradition) monthly on a Saturday evening and, from time to time sings at Sunday morning divine services.

== Bells ==
Unlike most large cathedrals in Germany, Berlin Cathedral only has 3 bells hanging in the northwest tower. The bells are suspended in a three-section steel frame. The heaviest bell is called the New Wilsnack Bell. It is decorated with images of the Crucified and the Risen Christ. It replaced the bell of the Wilsnack Church of the Holy Blood, dating from 1471, which had been located in the predecessor buildings of Berlin Cathedral since 1552. It became unusable due to a crack in 1921, was repaired, and, cracked again in 1928, was moved to Lauchhammer. There, in 1930, it was saved at the last minute from being melted down by the Märkisches Museum and was placed in the museum's church hall in 1935.

Bell Number	Bell Name (German)	Bell Name (English)	Casting year	Foundry, casting site	Weight	strike tone
1	Neue Wilsnacker Glocke	New Wilsnack Bell	1929	Lauchhammer Bell Foundry	3000 kg	h°
2	Brandenburger Glocke	Brandenburg Bell	1913	Bell foundry M & O Ohlsson ( Lübeck )	2128 kg	d'
3	Osterburger Glocke	Osterburg Bell	1532	Hinrik van Kampen	1752 kg	e'

== See also ==
- Religion in Berlin
- List of tallest domes
- List of tourist attractions in Berlin
