= Bishopric of Brandenburg =

Bishopric of Brandenburg may refer to:

- Diocese of Brandenburg, the spiritual jurisdiction of the bishop of Brandenburg, active from the 10th to 16th centuries
- Prince-Bishopric of Brandenburg, the state ruled by the bishop of Brandenburg from the 12th to 16th centuries
