= Aulosen =

- Ortsteil of Aland
- Interactive map of Aulosen
- Location within Germany Location within Saxony-Anhalt
- Coordinates: 52°58′N 11°34′E
- Country: Germany
- State: Saxony-Anhalt
- District: Stendal
- Municipality: Aland

Area
  - Total: 18.26 km^{2} (7.05 sq mi)
- Elevation: 17 m (56 ft)

Population (2006-12-31)
  - Total: 236
  - Density: 12.9/km^{2} (33.5/sq mi)
- Time zone: UTC+01:00 (CET)
  - Summer (DST): UTC+02:00 (CEST)
- Postal codes: 39615
- Dialling codes: 039395
- Vehicle registration: SDL
- Website: www.vgem-seehausen.de

Aulosen is a village and a former municipality in the district of Stendal, in Saxony-Anhalt, Germany. Since 1 January 2010, it is part of the municipality Aland.

== People ==
- Matthias von Jagow (1490-1544), bishop of Brandenburg
