= Germania Sacra =

Research project into German church history

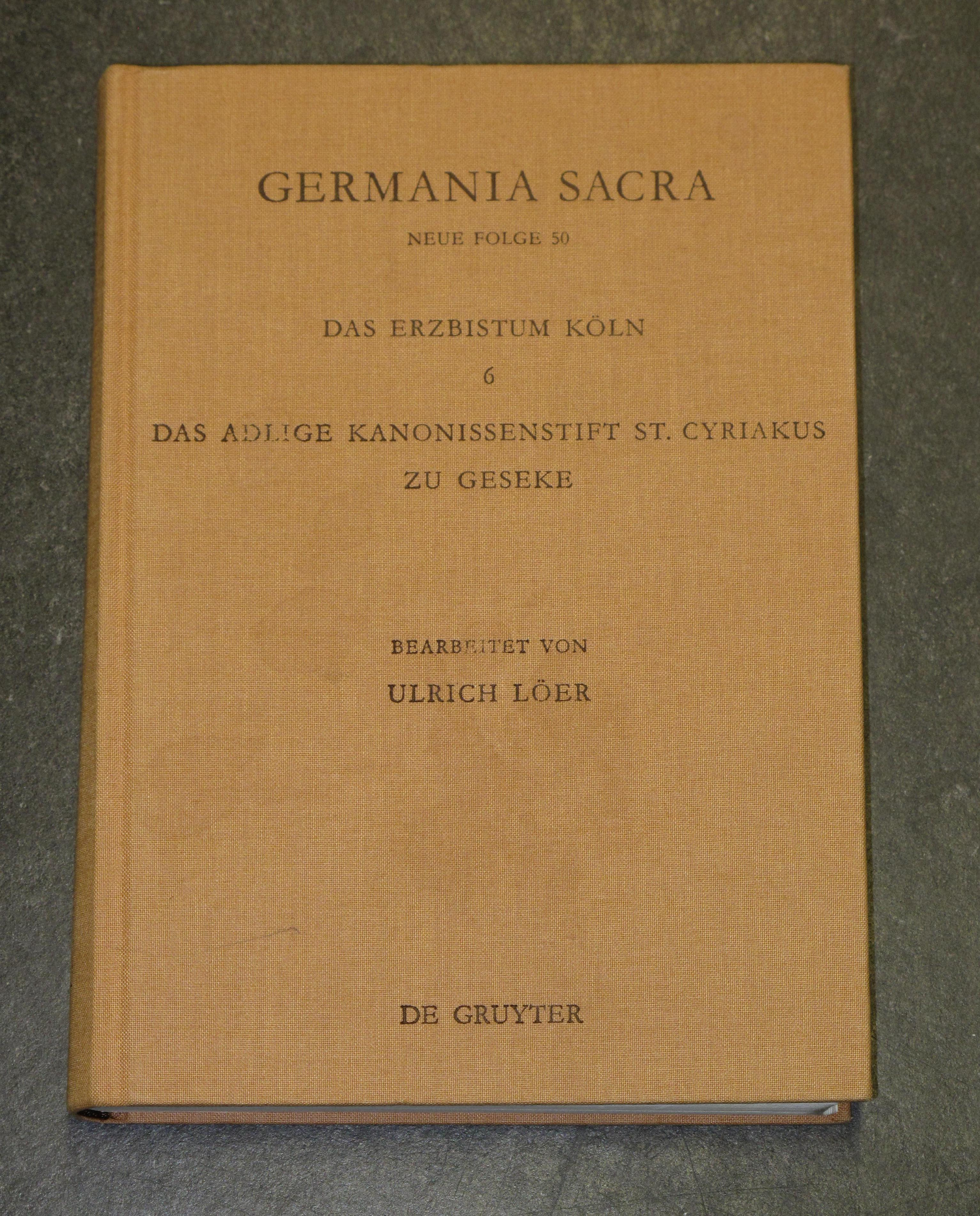
Neue Folge 14

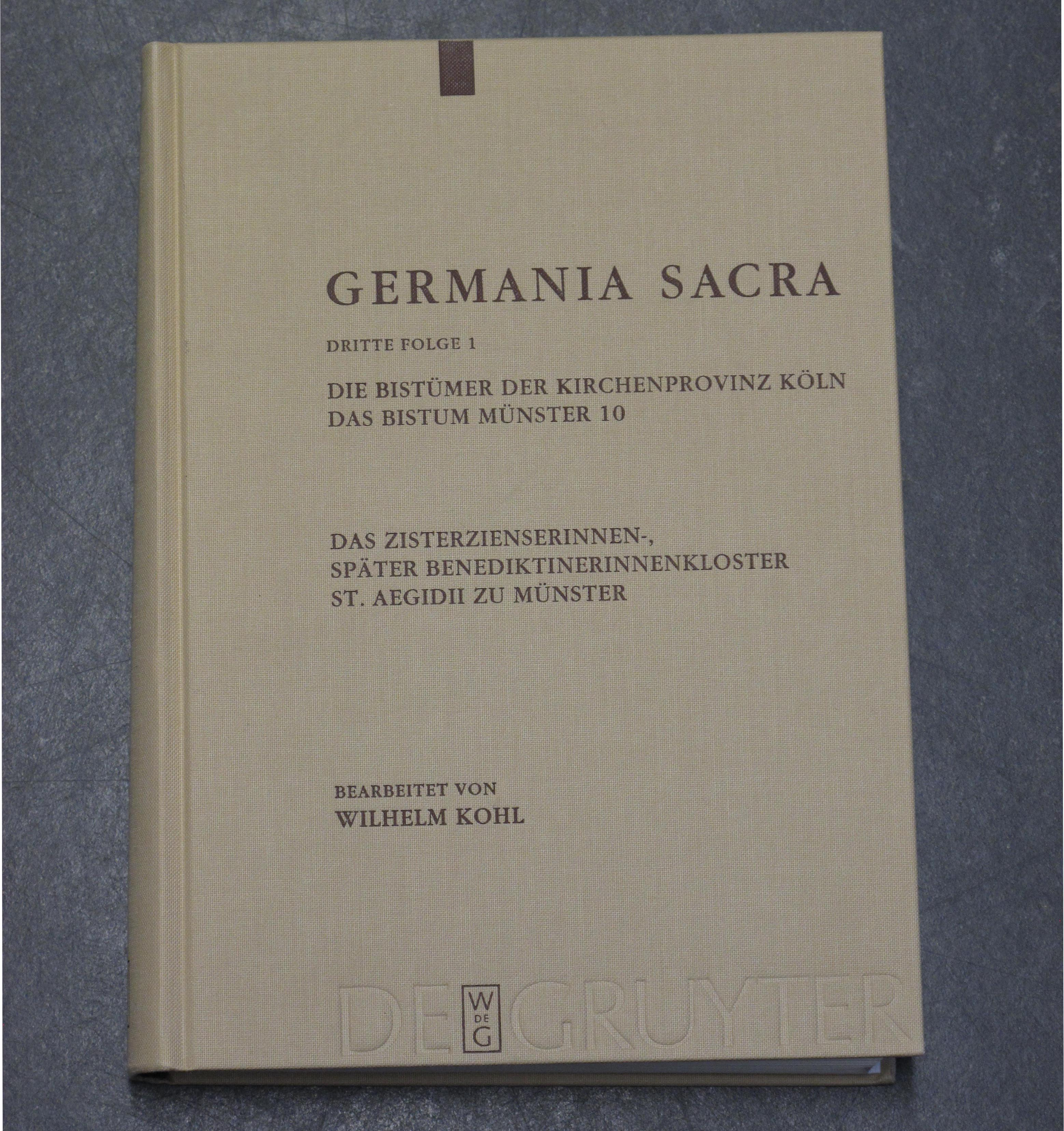
Dritte Folge 1

Germania Sacra (Latin for "Sacred/Holy Germania/Germany") is a long-term research project into German church history from its beginnings through the Reformation in the 16th century to German mediatisation in the early 19th century.

== History and Structure ==
The first attempt to collect and publish the history of the German dioceses in reference books was made by Martin Gerbert, the prince-abbot of the monastery St. Blasien in the late 18th century, but his works were never completed.

Following into Gerberts footsteps, Paul Fridolin Kehr established a new Germania Sacra under the patronage of the Kaiser-Wilhelm-Society at the Kaiser-Wilhelm-Institute of German History in Berlin in 1917. He tried to connect the nationwide research projects and combine them under Germania Sacra to create an archival collection of monasteries, convents, cathedral chapters and religious dignitaries. After multiple financial problems, the first book was published on 11 June in 1929. It is part of the “Alte Folge”, which comprises seven volumes published between 1929 and 1972.

After the 2nd World War and the death of Kehr, the Kaiser-Wilhelm-Society wasn't interested in supporting the institute any longer and the newly founded Max-Planck-Society took over the patronage of the institute and its project. Hermann Heimpel, the first head of the Max-Planck-Institute of History in Göttingen, continued work on the Germania Sacra in 1956, cooperating with an academic director, who coordinated the work of external researchers. While the last books of the Alte Folge were published between 1966 and 1972, the researchers under Heimpel began writing and publishing the Neue Folge, which were released between 1962 and 2007 in 50 volumes. In 2007, the Max-Planck-Institute of History in Göttingen was rededicated and the work on the Germania Sacra was continued by theAcademy of Sciences and Humanities under the supervision of Prof. Dr. Hedwig Röckelein in Göttingen in 2008. The volumes of the Germania Sacra published after 2008 belong to the Dritte Folge and currently comprise 14 volumes (as of: June 2018).

In 2015 the first supplementary volume was published, which contains edited preparation work to the main works of Germania Sacra.

== Objectives and methods ==
The main objective of Germania Sacra is a statistical description of the ecclesiastical institutions which existed between the Holy Roman Empire and German mediatisation in the early 19th century. In achieving that objective, the entirety of sources and secondary literature concerning Medieval and Early Modern ecclesiastical institutions is to be portrayed. These institutions include the dioceses (with focus on the bishops), the cathedral chapters and the monasteries and convents up to and including their end during the reformation or the German mediatisation. At the beginning, the collection and the editing of the historical sources was mainly conducted by archivists at the request of Paul Kehr. In the present, the work on Germania Sacra is divided between historical research and the editorial department. The research is conducted by archivists, historians, members of ecclesiastical orders, theologians etc.

== Publications and digital editions ==
Germania Sacras publications are divided into the Alte Folge, the Neue Folge, the Dritte Folge, the Studien zur Germania Sacra and the Supplementbände zur Germania Sacra.

In addition to the volumes of Germania Sacra, the project provides two databases. A comprehensive inventory of medieval and early modern clerics and the "Database of monasteries, convents and collegiate churches of the Old Empire "

=== Alte Folge ===
| No. | Title | Author | Year of Publication | Online |
|---|---|---|---|---|
| AF Abt 1 | Das Bistum Brandenburg 1 (Germania Sacra A. F. Abt. 1: Die Bistümer der Kirchenprovinz Magdeburg) | Gustav Abb, Gottfried Wentz | 1929 | Digitalisat |
| AF Abt 1 | Das Bistum Brandenburg 2 (Germania Sacra A. F. Abt. 1: Die Bistümer der Kirchenprovinz Magdeburg) | Fritz Bünger, Gottfried Wentz | 1941 | Digitalisat |
| AF Abt 1 | Das Bistum Havelberg (Germania Sacra A. F. Abt. 1: Die Bistümer der Kirchenprovinz Magdeburg) | Gottfried Wentz | 1933 | Digitalisat |
| AF Abt 1 | Das Erzbistum Magdeburg 1,1: Das Domstift St. Moritz in Magdeburg (Germania Sacra A. F. Abt. 1: Die Bistümer der Kirchenprovinz Magdeburg) | Gottfried Wentz, Berent Schwineköper | 1972 | Digitalisat |
| AF Abt 1 | Das Erzbistum Magdeburg 1,2: Die Kollegiatstifte St. Sebastian, St. Nicolai, St. Peter und Paul und St. Gangolf in Magdeburg (Germania Sacra A. F. Abt. 1: Die Bistümer der Kirchenprovinz Magdeburg) | Gottfried Wentz, Berent Schwineköper | 1972 | Digitalisat |
| AF Abt 2 | Das Bistum Bamberg 1 (Germania Sacra A. F. Abt. 2: Die Bistümer der Kirchenprovinz Mainz) | Erich von Guttenberg | 1937 | |
| AF Abt 2 | Das Bistum Bamberg 2: Die Pfarreiorganisation (Germania Sacra A. F. Abt. 2: Die Bistümer der Kirchenprovinz Mainz) | Erich von Guttenberg, Alfred Wendehorst | 1966 | |
| AF Abt 3 | Die Bistümer der Kirchenprovinz Köln: Archidiakonat von Xanten (Germania Sacra A. F. Abt. 3: Die Bistümer der Kirchenprovinz Köln) | Wilhelm Classen | 1938 | Digitalisat |

=== Neue Folge ===
| No. | Title | Author | Year of Publication | online |
|---|---|---|---|---|
| NF 1 | Die Bistümer der Kirchenprovinz Mainz. Das Bistum Würzburg 1. Die Bischofsreihe bis 1254. | Alfred Wendehorst | 1962 | Digitalisat |
| NF 2 | Die Bistümer der Kirchenprovinz Köln. Das Erzbistum Köln 1. Die Cistercienserabtei Altenberg. | Hans Mosler | 1965 | Digitalisat |
| NF 3 | Die Bistümer der Kirchenprovinz Köln. Das Bistum Münster 1. Die Schwesternhäuser nach der Augustinerregel. | Wilhelm Kohl | 1968 | Digitalisat |
| NF 4 | Die Bistümer der Kirchenprovinz Mainz. Das Bistum Würzburg 2. Die Bischofsreihe von 1254 bis 1455. | Alfred Wendehorst | 1969 | Digitalisat |
| NF 5 | Die Bistümer der Kirchenprovinz Köln. Das Bistum Münster 2. Die Klöster der Augustiner-Chorherren. | Wilhelm Kohl | 1971 | Digitalisat |
| NF 6 | Die Bistümer der Kirchenprovinz Trier. Das Erzbistum Trier 1. Das Stift St. Paulin vor Trier. | Franz-Joseph Heyen | 1972 | Digitalisat |
| NF 7 | Die Bistümer der Kirchenprovinz Mainz. Das Bistum Hildesheim 1. Das Reichsunmittelbare Kanonissenstift Gandersheim. | Hans Goetting | 1973 | Digitalisat |
| NF 8 | Die Bistümer der Kirchenprovinz Mainz. Das Bistum Hildesheim 2. Das Benediktiner(innen)kloster Brunshausen. Das Benediktinerinnenkloster St. Marien vor Gandersheim. Das Benediktinerkloster Clus. Das Franziskanerkloster Gandersheim. | Hans Goetting | 1974 | Digitalisat |
| NF 9 | Die Bistümer der Kirchenprovinz Köln. Das Erzbistum Köln 2. Die Benediktinerabtei Siegburg. | Erich Wisplinghoff | 1975 | Digitalisat |
| NF 10 | Die Bistümer der Kirchenprovinz Köln. Das Bistum Münster 3. Das (freiweltliche) Damenstift Freckenhorst. | Wilhelm Kohl | 1975 | Digitalisat |
| NF 11 | Die Bistümer der Kirchenprovinz Salzburg. Das Erzbistum Salzburg 1. Die Zisterzienserabtei Raitenhaslach. | Edgar Krausen | 1977 | Digitalisat |
| NF 12 | Die Bistümer der Kirchenprovinz Köln. Das Erzbistum Köln 3. Die Reichsabtei Werden an der Ruhr. | Wilhelm Stüwer | 1980 | Digitalisat |
| NF 13 | Die Bistümer der Kirchenprovinz Mainz. Das Bistum Würzburg 3. Die Bischofsreihe von 1455 bis 1617. | Alfred Wendehorst | 1978 | Digitalisat |
| NF 14 | Die Bistümer der Kirchenprovinz Trier. Das Erzbistum Trier 2. Die Stifte St. Severus in Boppard, St. Goar in St. Goar, Liebfrauen in Oberwesel, St. Martin in Oberwesel. | Ferdinand Pauly | 1980 | Digitalisat |
| NF 15 | Die Bistümer der Kirchenprovinz Mainz. Das Bistum Konstanz 1. Das Stift St. Stephan in Konstanz. | Helmut Maurer | 1981 | Digitalisat |
| NF 16 | Die Bistümer der Kirchenprovinz Mainz. Das Bistum Konstanz 2. Die Zisterzienserabtei Bebenhausen. | Jürgen Sydow | 1984 | Digitalisat |
| NF 17,1 | Die Bistümer der Kirchenprovinz Köln. Das Bistum Münster 4,1. Das Domstift St. Paulus zu Münster. | Wilhelm Kohl | 1987 | Digitalisat |
| NF 17,2 | Die Bistümer der Kirchenprovinz Köln. Das Bistum Münster 4,2. Das Domstift St. Paulus zu Münster. | Wilhelm Kohl | 1982 | Digitalisat |
| NF 17,3 | Die Bistümer der Kirchenprovinz Köln. Das Bistum Münster 4,3. Das Domstift St. Paulus zu Münster. | Wilhelm Kohl | 1989 | Digitalisat |
| NF 18 | Die Bistümer der Kirchenprovinz Köln. Das Erzbistum Köln 4. Die Zisterzienserinnenklöster Saarn, Duissern, Sterkrade. | Günter von Roden | 1984 | Digitalisat |
| NF 19 | Die Bistümer der Kirchenprovinz Trier. Das Erzbistum Trier 3. Das Stift St. Kastor in Karden an der Mosel. | Ferdinand Pauly | 1986 | Digitalisat |
| NF 20 | Die Bistümer der Kirchenprovinz Mainz. Das Bistum Hildesheim 3. Die Hildesheimer Bischöfe von 815 bis 1221 (1227). | Hans Goetting | 1984 | Digitalisat |
| NF 21 | Die Bistümer der Kirchenprovinz Köln. Das Bistum Osnabrück 1. Das Kanonissenstift und Benediktinerinnenkloster Herzebrock. | Edeltraud Klueting | 1986 | Digitalisat |
| NF 22 | Die Bistümer der Kirchenprovinz Trier. Das Erzbistum Trier 4. Das Stift St. Lubentius in Dietkirchen. | Wolf-Heino Struck | 1986 | Digitalisat |
| NF 23 | Die Bistümer der Kirchenprovinz Köln. Das Bistum Münster 5. Das Kanonissenstift und Benediktinerkloster Liesborn. | Helmut Müller | 1987 | Digitalisat |
| NF 24 | Die Bistümer der Kirchenprovinz Salzburg. Das Bistum Freising 1. Das Augustinerchorherrenstift Dietramszell. | Edgar Krausen | 1988 | Digitalisat |
| NF 25 | Die Bistümer der Kirchenprovinz Trier. Das Erzbistum Trier 5. Die Stifte St. Severus in Gemünden, St. Maria in Diez mit ihren Vorläufern. St. Petrus in Kettenbach. St. Adelphus in Salz. | Wolf-Heino Struck | 1988 | Digitalisat |
| NF 26 | Die Bistümer der Kirchenprovinz Mainz. Das Bistum Würzburg 4. Das Stift Neumünster in Würzburg. | Alfred Wendehorst | 1989 | Digitalisat |
| NF 27 | Die Bistümer der Kirchenprovinz Trier. Das Erzbistum Trier 6. Die Stifte St. Walpurgis in Weilburg und St. Martin in Idstein. | Wolf-Heino Struck | 1990 | Digitalisat |
| NF 28 | Die Bistümer der Kirchenprovinz Mainz. Das Bistum Augsburg 1. Die Benediktinerabtei Benediktbeuern. | Josef Hemmerle | 1991 | Digitalisat |
| NF 29 | Die Bistümer der Kirchenprovinz Köln. Das Erzbistum Köln 5. Die Benediktinerabtei Brauweiler. | Erich Wisplinghoff | 1992 | Digitalisat |
| NF 30 | Die Bistümer der Kirchenprovinz Mainz. Bistum Konstanz 3. Das Zisterzienserinnenkloster Wald. | Maren Kuhn-Rehfus | 1992 | Digitalisat |
| NF 31 | Die Bistümer der Kirchenprovinz Trier. Das Erzbistum Trier 7. Die Benediktinerabtei Laach. | Bertram Resmini | 1993 | Digitalisat |
| NF 32 | Die Bistümer der Kirchenprovinz Mainz. Das Bistum Konstanz 4. Das (freiweltliche) Damenstift Buchau am Federsee. | Bernhard Theil | 1994 | Digitalisat |
| NF 33 | Die Bistümer der Kirchenprovinz Köln. Das Bistum Münster 6. Das Stift Alter Dom St. Pauli in Münster. | Klaus Scholz | 1995 | Digitalisat |
| NF 34 | Die Bistümer der Kirchenprovinz Trier. Das Erzbistum Trier 8. Die Benediktinerabtei St. Eucharius – St. Matthias vor Trier. | Petrus Becker | 1996 | Digitalisat |
| NF 35,1 | Die Bistümer der Kirchenprovinz Magdeburg. Das Bistum Naumburg 1,1. Die Diözese. | Heinz Wießner | 1997 | Digitalisat |
| NF 35,2 | Die Bistümer der Kirchenprovinz Magdeburg. Das Bistum Naumburg 1,2. Die Diözese. | Heinz Wießner | 1998 | Online-Ausgabe |
| NF 36 | Die Bistümer der Kirchenprovinz Mainz. Das Bistum Würzburg 5. Die Stifte in Schmalkalden und Römhild. | Alfred Wendehorst | 1996 | Digitalisat |
| NF 37,1 | Die Bistümer der Kirchenprovinz Köln. Das Bistum Münster 7,1. Die Diözese. | Wilhelm Kohl | 1999 | Digitalisat |
| NF 37,2 | Die Bistümer der Kirchenprovinz Köln. Das Bistum Münster 7,2. Die Diözese. | Wilhelm Kohl | 2002 | Digitalisat |
| NF 37,3 | Die Bistümer der Kirchenprovinz Köln. Das Bistum Münster 7,3. Die Diözese. | Wilhelm Kohl | 2003 | Digitalisat |
| NF 37,4 | Die Bistümer der Kirchenprovinz Köln. Das Bistum Münster 7,4. Die Diözese. | Wilhelm Kohl | 2004 | Digitalisat |
| NF 38,1 | Die Bistümer der Kirchenprovinz Mainz. Das exemte Bistum Bamberg 3. Die Bischofsreihe von 1522 bis 1693. | Dieter J. Weiß | 2000 | Digitalisat |
| NF 39 | Die Bistümer der Kirchenprovinz Mainz. Das Bistum Augsburg 2. Die Benediktinerabtei Wessobrunn. | Irmtraud von Andrian-Werburg | 2001 | Digitalisat |
| NF 40 | Die Bistümer der Kirchenprovinz Mainz. Das Bistum Würzburg 6. Die Benediktinerabtei und das Adelige Säkularkanonikerstift St. Burkard in Würzburg. | Alfred Wendehorst | 2001 | Digitalisat |
| NF 41 | Die Bistümer der Kirchenprovinz Trier. Das Erzbistum Trier 9. Das Stift St. Simeon in Trier. | Franz-Josef Heyen | 2002 | Digitalisat |
| NF 42,1 | Die Bistümer der Kirchenprovinz Mainz. Das Bistum Konstanz 5. Konstanzer Bischöfe 6. Jahrhundert bis 1206. | Helmut Maurer | 2003 | Digitalisat |
| NF 43 | Die Bistümer der Kirchenprovinz Trier. Das Erzbistum Trier 10. Das St. Marien-Stift in (Trier-)Pfalzel. | Franz-Josef Heyen | 2005 | Digitalisat |
| NF 44 | Die Bistümer der Kirchenprovinz Köln. Das Bistum Münster 8. Das (freiweltliche) Damenstift Nottuln. | Wilhelm Kohl | 2005 | Digitalisat |
| NF 45 | Die Bistümer der Kirchenprovinz Mainz. Das Bistum Eichstätt 1. Die Bischofsreihe bis 1535. | Alfred Wendehorst | 2006 | Digitalisat |
| NF 46 | Die Bistümer der Kirchenprovinz Mainz. Das Bistum Hildesheim 4. Die Hildesheimer Bischöfe von 1221 bis 1398. | Nathalie Kruppa und Jürgen Wilke | 2006 | Digitalisat |
| NF 47 | Die Bistümer der Kirchenprovinz Köln. Das Bistum Münster 9. Das Kollegiatstift St. Mauritius vor Münster. | Wilhelm Kohl | 2007 | Digitalisat |
| NF 48 | Die Bistümer der Kirchenprovinz Trier. Das Bistum Trier 11. Das St. Marien-Stift in Kyllburg. | Franz-Josef Heyen | 2007 | Digitalisat |
| NF 49 | Die Bistümer der Kirchenprovinz Mainz. Das Bistum Halberstadt 1. Das Stift St. Nikolaus in Stendal. | Christian Popp | 2007 | Digitalisat |
| NF 50 | Die Bistümer der Kirchenprovinz Köln. Das Erzbistum Köln 6. Das adlige Kanonissenstift St. Cyriakus zu Geseke. | Ulrich Löer | 2007 | Digitalisat |

=== Dritte Folge ===
| No. | Title | Author | Year of Publication | online |
|---|---|---|---|---|
| 3. F. 1 | Die Bistümer der Kirchenprovinz Köln. Das Bistum Münster 10. Das Zisterzienserinnen-, später Benediktinerinnenkloster St. Aegidii zu Münster | Wilhelm Kohl | 2009 | Digitalisat |
| 3. F. 2 | Die Bistümer der Kirchenprovinz Köln. Das Bistum Münster 11. Die Zisterzienserabtei Marienfeld | Wilhelm Kohl | 2010 | Digitalisat |
| 3. F. 3 | Die Bistümer der Kirchenprovinz Mainz. Das Bistum Augsburg 3. Das Augustinerchorherrenstift Bernried | Walburga Scherbaum | 2011 | Digitalisat |
| 3. F. 4 | Die Bistümer der Kirchenprovinz Mainz. Das Bistum Würzburg 7. Die Würzburger Bischöfe von 1617 bis 1684 | Winfried Romberg | 2011 | Digitalisat |
| 3. F. 5 | Die Bistümer der Kirchenprovinz Mainz. Das Bistum Konstanz 6. Das reichsunmittelbare Prämonstratenserstift Marchtal | Wilfried Schöntag | 2012 | Digitalisat |
| 3. F. 6 | Die Bistümer der Kirchenprovinz Mainz. Das Bistum Paderborn 1. Die Zisterzienserabtei Bredelar | Helmut Müller | 2013 | Digitalisat |
| 3. F. 7 | Das (exemte) Bistum Meißen 1. Das Kollegiatstift St. Petri zu Bautzen von der Gründung bis 1569 | Hermann Kinne | 2014 | Digitalisat |
| 3. F. 8 | Das Bistum Würzburg 8. Die Würzburger Bischöfe von 1684 bis 1746 | Winfried Romberg | 2014 | Digitalisat |
| 3. F. 9 | Das Erzbistum Salzburg 2: Das Augustinerchorherrenstift St. Zeno in Reichenhall | Johannes Lang | 2015 | |
| 3. F. 10 | Das Erzbistum Trier 12: Das Kollegiatstift St. Martin und St. Severus zu Münstermaifeld | Clemens Graf von Looz-Corswarem | 2015 | |
| 3. F. 11 | Das Erzbistum Trier 13: Die Benediktinerabtei St. Maximin vor Trier | Bertram Resmini | 2016 | |
| 3. F. 12 | Das exemte Bistum Bamberg 4: Die Bamberger Bischöfe von 1693 bis 1802 | Dieter J. Weiß | 2015 | |
| 3. F. 13 | Das Bistum Regensburg 1: Die Regensburger Bischöfe von 1649 bis 1817 | Karl Hausberger | 2017 | |
| 3. F. 14 | Das Erzbistum Köln 7: Die Zisterzienserabtei Marienstatt | Christian Hillen | 2017 | |

=== Supplementbände ===
| No. | Title | Author | Year of Publication | online |
|---|---|---|---|---|
| Supplementband 1 | Stiftsherren und Vikare des Kollegiatstifts St. Peter und Paul in Zeitz 1400–1564. (Germania Sacra. Supplementband 1) | Matthias Ludwig | 2015 | Digitale Ausgabe |

== Literature ==
- Georg Pfeilschifter: Die St. Blasianische Germania Sacra. Ein Beitrag zur Historiographie des 18. Jahrhunderts. Kempten, 1921.
- Irene Crusius: Beiträge zu Geschichte und Struktur der mittelalterlichen Germania sacra. Göttingen, 1989.
- Irene Crusius: Die Germania Sacra. Stand und Perspektiven eines langfristigen Forschungsprojekts. In: Deutsches Archiv für Erforschung des Mittelalters. Vol. 52, 1996, pp. 629–642.
- Wolfgang Müller (Bearb.): Briefe und Akten des Fürstabtes Martin Gerbert. 2 volumes, 1962.
- Sven Kriese: Die Germania Sacra in der Weimarer Republik und im Nationalsozialismus. In: Hedwig Röckelein (ed.), 100 Jahre Germania Sacra. Kirchengeschichte Schreiben vom 16. bis zum 21. Jahrhundert (Studien zur Germania Sacra. Neue Folge 8). Berlin/Boston 2018 (In Press), pp. 87–118.
