= Prince-Bishopric of Brandenburg =

Former principality in Germany, 1165 to 1598

Coordinates: 52.40842°N 12.56249°E

Prince-Bishopric of Brandenburg Hochstift Brandenburg (German)
- 1165–1598
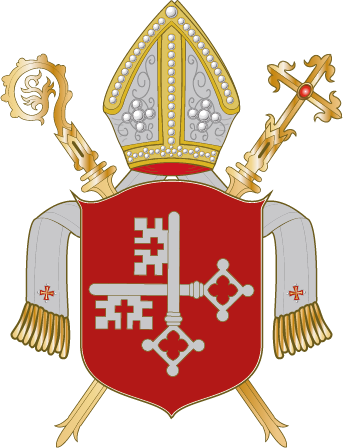
- Coat of arms

- Episcopal territories, about 1535
- Status: State of the Holy Roman Empire
- Capital: Brandenburg an der Havel; Ziesar (residence)
- Common languages: Brandenburgisch, Polabian
- Religion: Catholic until the 1530s, then Lutheran
- Government: Elective monarchy, ruled by the bishop holding the see, elected by the cathedral chapter or, exceptionally, appointed by the Pope, or ruled by a regent
- Prince-Bishop, or Regent
  - 1173–1179: Prince-Bishop Sigfrid I
  - 1421–1459: Prince-Bishop Stephan
  - 1560–1569: Regent John George
  - 1569–1571: Regent Joachim Frederick
- Historical era: Middle Ages
  - Diocese founded and restored: 948; 1161
  - Territorial reign est.: 1165
  - De facto supremacy of Electoral Brandenburg: 1373
  - Electors privileged to choose candidates for the see: 1447
  - Secularised as part of Electoral Brandenburg: 1571
  - Legal dissolution: 1598
- Currency: rixdollar
Preceded by	Succeeded by
Northern March	Margraviate of Brandenburg

The Prince-Bishopric of Brandenburg (German: Hochstift Brandenburg) was an ecclesiastical principality of the Holy Roman Empire from the 12th century until it was secularized during the second half of the 16th century. It should not be confused with the larger Diocese of Brandenburg (Latin: Dioecesis Brandenburgensis) established by King Otto I of Germany in 948, in the territory of the Marca Geronis (Saxon Eastern March) east of the Elbe river. The diocese, over which the prince-bishop exercised only spiritual authority, was a suffragan diocese of the Archdiocese of Magdeburg, its seat was Brandenburg an der Havel.

== History ==
The Prince-Bishopric of Brandenburg was an imperial estate of the Holy Roman Empire for some time, probably starting about 1161/1165. However, the Brandenburg bishops never managed to gain control over a significant territory, being overshadowed by the Margraviate of Brandenburg, which was originally seated in the same city. Chapter and cathedral, surrounded by further ecclesiastical institutions, were located on the Dominsel (Cathedral Island), which formed a prince-episcopal cathedral immunity district (Domfreiheit), distinct from the city of Brandenburg. Only in 1929 the - meanwhile former - immunity district was incorporated into the city itself.

As rulers of imperial immediacy, regnant in a, however, dispersed territory partitioned into the four bailiwicks (German: Ämter) of Brandenburg/Havel, Ketzin, Teltow and Ziesar. The prince-bishops from the early 14th century onwards resided in their fortress in Ziesar on the road to Magdeburg. The last actual bishop was Matthias von Jagow (d. 1544), who took the side of the Protestant Reformation, married, and in every way furthered the undertakings of the Hohenzollern elector Joachim II.

There were two more nominal bishops, but on the petition of the latter of these, the electoral prince John George of Brandenburg appointed in 1560, the secularisation of the bishopric was undertaken and finally accomplished in 1571, in spite of legal proceedings to reassert the imperial immediacy of the prince-bishopric within the Empire and so to likewise preserve the diocese, which dragged on into the 17th century.

== Prince-bishops ==
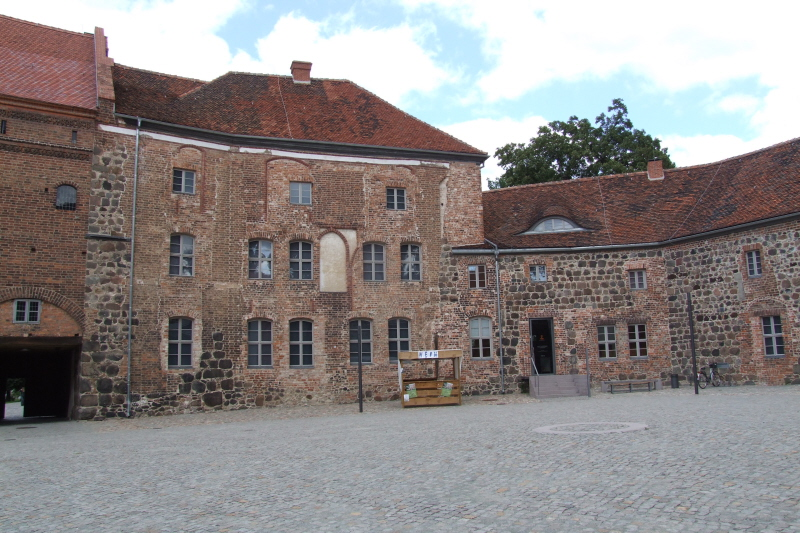
Ziesar Castle, now a museum also showing the history of the Prince-Bishopric of Brandenburg

=== Catholics ===
- 1138–1160: Wiggar
- 1160–1173: Wilman
- 1173–1179: Sigfried I
- 1179–1190: Baldran
- 1190–1192: Alexius
- 1192–1205: Norbert
- 1205–1216: Baldwin
- 1216–1220: Siegfried II
- 1221–1222: Ludolf von Schanebeck, claimant, but not enthroned
- 1221–1222: Wichmann von Arnstein, counter-claimant, also not enthroned
- 1222–1241: Gernot
- 1241–1251: Ruotger von Kerkow
- 1251–1261: Otto von Mehringen
- 1261–1278: Heinrich I von Osthenen (or Ostheeren)
- 1278–1287: Gebhard
- 1287–1290: Heidenreich
- 1290–1291: Richard, refused the appointment
- 1291–1296: Dietrich, not enthroned
- 1296–1302: Vollrad von Krempa
- 1303–1316: Friedrich von Plötzkau
- 1316–1324: Johann I von Tuchen
- 1324–1327: Heinrich II Count of Barby, not enthroned
- 1327–1347: Ludwig Schenk von Reindorf (or Neuendorf)
- 1347–1365: Dietrich II Kothe
- 1366–1393: Dietrich III von der Schulenburg
- 1393–1406: Heinrich III von Bodendiek (or Bodendieck)
- 1406–1414: Henning von Bredow
- 1414: Friedrich von Grafeneck, Prince-Bishop of Augsburg 1413–1414
- 1415–1420: Johann von Waldow, Bishop of Lebus 1420–1423
- 1420: Friedrich von Grafeneck, again
- 1421–1459: Stephan Bodecker
- 1459–1472: Dietrich IV von Stechow
- 1472–1485: Arnold von Burgsdorff
- 1485–1507: Joachim I von Bredow
- 1507–1520: Hieronymus Schulz (or Scultetus), Bishop of Havelberg 1521–1522
- 1520–1526: Dietrich V von Hardenberg

=== Lutherans ===
- 1526–1544: Matthias von Jagow
- 1544–1546: Sede vacante
- 1546–1560: Joachim of Münsterberg-Oels
- 1560–1569/71: John George of Brandenburg, regent (Verweser)
- 1569/71: Joachim Frederick of Brandenburg

Secularized and merged into Brandenburg.
