= Stephan Bodecker =

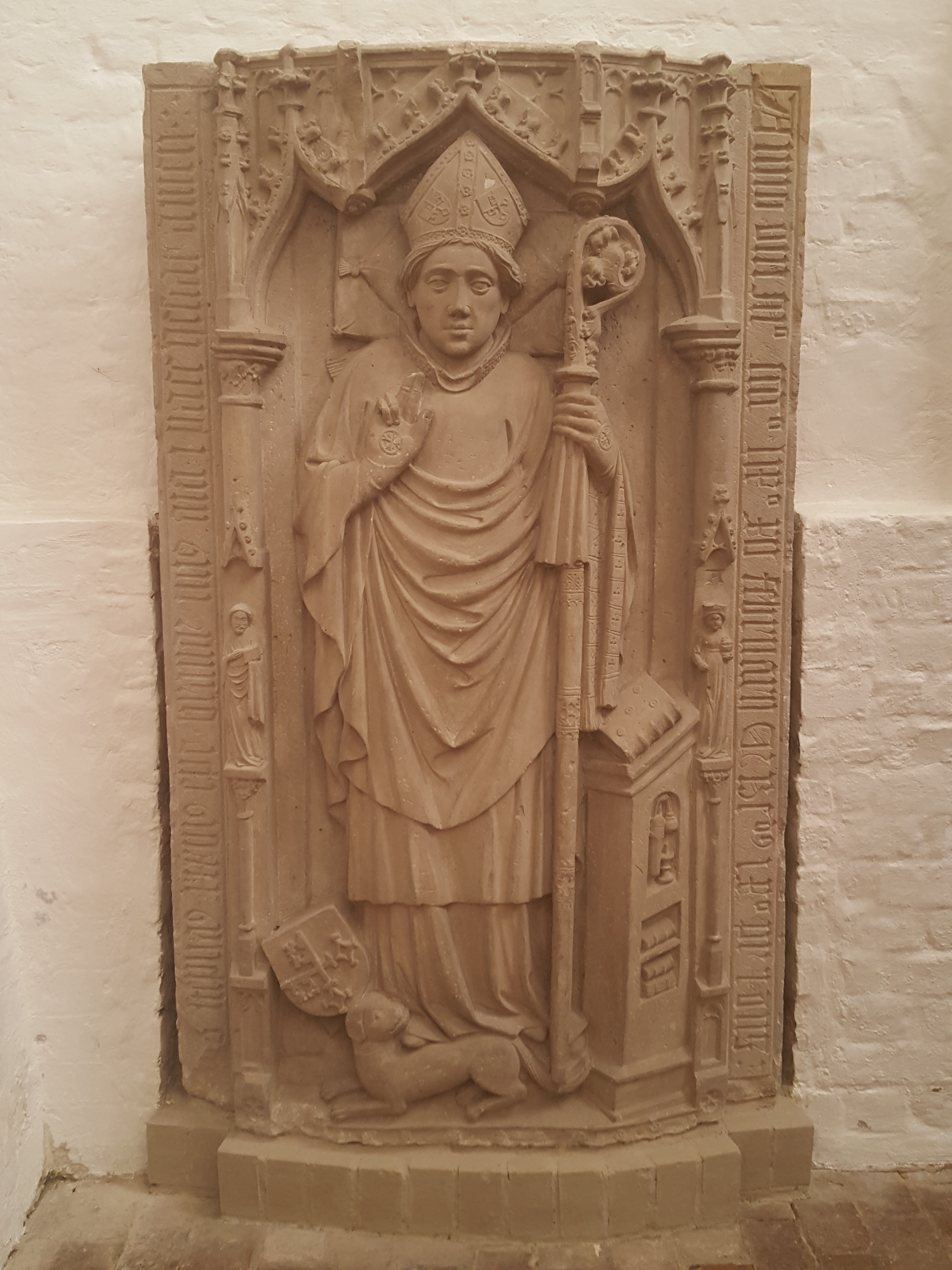
tombstone of Bishop Stephan in the cathedral of Brandenburg "St. Peter and Paul

Stephan Bodecker (1384 – 15 February 1459) was the 37th Bishop of Brandenburg and a Christian Hebraist. He is known as the most important of the bishops of Brandenburg.

He was born the son of a poor cooper from Rathenow, a small town on the river Havel around 20 miles north of Brandenburg an der Havel. The very gifted young Bodecker studied arts, philosophy and law at the universities of Erfurt, Leipzig and Prague and became a well known scholar and adviser to the Brandenburgian margraves. As bishop of Brandenburg he became a Prince of the Empire, thus having a very unusual career for the Middle Ages.

Bishop Bodecker was a knowledgeable friend and strong defender of the discriminated Jews in Brandenburg. Furthermore, he reorganized the diocese, which was in a chaotic state when he took office.

Bishop Bodecker was a member of the order of Premonstratensians.

He is buried in the Cathedral of Ss. Peter and Paul (in German) in Brandenburg.

Regnal titles
Catholic Church titles
Preceded by Frederick II	Prince-Bishop of Brandenburg; 1421–1459	Succeeded by Dietrich IV
