= Diocese of Brandenburg =

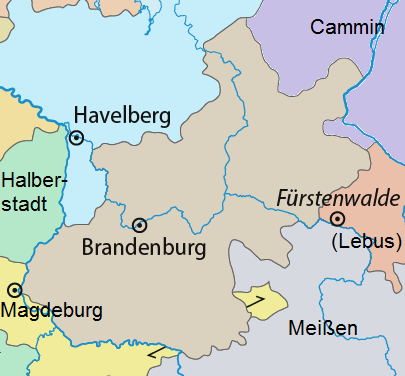
Map of the diocese of Brandenburg

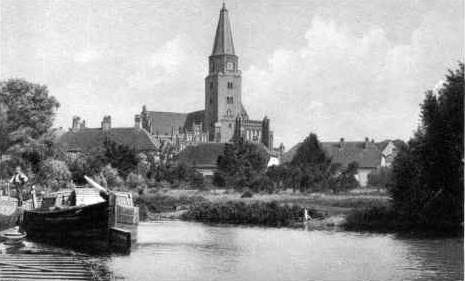
Cathedral of Saints Peter and Paul in Brandenburg, 19th century

The diocese of Brandenburg existed between the 10th and 16th centuries. From the 12th century, its bishops also ruled the Hochstift Brandenburg.

== History ==
The foundation charter of the Brandenburg diocese is dated 1 October 948, though the actual founding date remained disputed among historians. The medieval chronicler Thietmar of Merseburg mentions the year 938; the bishopric may also have been established in the course of the partition of the vast Marca Geronis and the emergence of the Northern March after Margrave Gero's death in 965. With the foundation, King Otto (Holy Roman Emperor from 962) aimed at the Christianization of the Polabian Slavs (Wends) and the incorporation of their territory into the East Frankish realm.

Brandenburg was originally a suffragan of the Archbishopric of Mainz, but in 968 it came under the jurisdiction of the Magdeburg archbishops. The Great Slav Rising of 983 practically annihilated it, when revolting Lutici tribes conquered Brandenburg and the neighbouring Bishopric of Havelberg. Brandenburg bishops continued to be appointed, but they were merely titular, residing in Magdeburg or acting as auxiliary bishops in the western territories of the Empire. Not until the final subjugation of the Wends in the 12th century by Margrave Albert the Bear, the German eastward settlement (Ostsiedlung) in the diocesan region revived the bishopric.

Bishop Wigers of Brandenburg (acting 1138–60), an adherent of Norbert of Xanten, was the first of a series of bishops of the Premonstratensian Order, which chose the occupants of the episcopal see until 1447; in that year a bull of Pope Nicholas V gave the right of nomination to the Brandenburg elector, with whom the bishops stood in a close feudal relation. Bishop Wigers also established a Premonstratensian convent at Leitzkau (today part of Gommern, Saxony-Anhalt). Probably at the request of the Hevellian prince Pribislav-Henry, he established another convent at the Slavic Parduin settlement in present-day Brandenburg an der Havel, which became the nucleus of the revived Brandenburg cathedral chapter. The incorporation into the Premonstratensian Order was confirmed by Pope Clement III in 1188.

== List of bishops ==
=== Early bishops ===
- 949–968: Dietmar
- 968–980: Dodilo
- 980–1004: Volkmar
- 992–1018: Wigo
- 1022–1032: Luizo
- 1032-1048: Rudolf
- 1048–1051: Dankwart
- 1068–1080: Dietrich I
- 1080–1092: Volkmar II
- 1100–1122: Hartbert
- 1124–1137: Ludolf
- 1137–1138: Landbert

=== Prince-bishops ===
- 1138–1160: Wiggar
- 1160–1173: Wilman
- 1173–1179: Sigfried I
- 1179–1190: Baldran
- 1190–1192: Alexius
- 1192–1205: Norbert
- 1205–1216: Baldwin
- 1216–1220: Siegfried II
- 1221–1222: Ludolf von Schanebeck, claimant, but not enthroned
- 1221–1222: Wichmann von Arnstein, counter-claimant, also not enthroned
- 1222–1241: Gernot
- 1241–1251: Ruotger von Kerkow
- 1251–1261: Otto von Mehringen
- 1261–1278: Heinrich I von Osthenen (or Ostheeren)
- 1278–1287: Gebhard
- 1287–1290: Heidenreich
- 1290–1291: Richard, refused the appointment
- 1291–1296: Dietrich, not enthroned
- 1296–1302: Vollrad von Krempa
- 1303–1316: Friedrich von Plötzkau
- 1316–1324: Johann I von Tuchen
- 1324–1327: Heinrich II Count of Barby, not enthroned
- 1327–1347: Ludwig Schenk von Reindorf (or Neuendorf)
- 1347–1365: Dietrich II Kothe
- 1366–1393: Dietrich III von der Schulenburg
- 1393–1406: Heinrich III von Bodendiek (or Bodendieck)
- 1406–1414: Henning von Bredow
- 1414: Friedrich von Grafeneck, Prince-Bishop of Augsburg 1413–1414
- 1415–1420: Johann von Waldow, Bishop of Lebus 1420–1423
- 1420: Friedrich von Grafeneck, again
- 1421–1459: Stephan Bodecker
- 1459–1472: Dietrich IV von Stechow
- 1472–1485: Arnold von Burgsdorff
- 1485–1507: Joachim I von Bredow
- 1507–1520: Hieronymus Schulz (or Scultetus), Bishop of Havelberg 1521–1522
- 1520–1526: Dietrich V von Hardenberg

=== Lutheran bishops ===
- 1526–1544: Matthias von Jagow
- 1544–1546: Sede vacante
- 1546–1560: Joachim of Münsterberg-Oels
- 1560–1569/71: John George of Brandenburg, regent (Verweser)
- 1569/71: Joachim Frederick of Brandenburg
