= Matthias von Jagow =

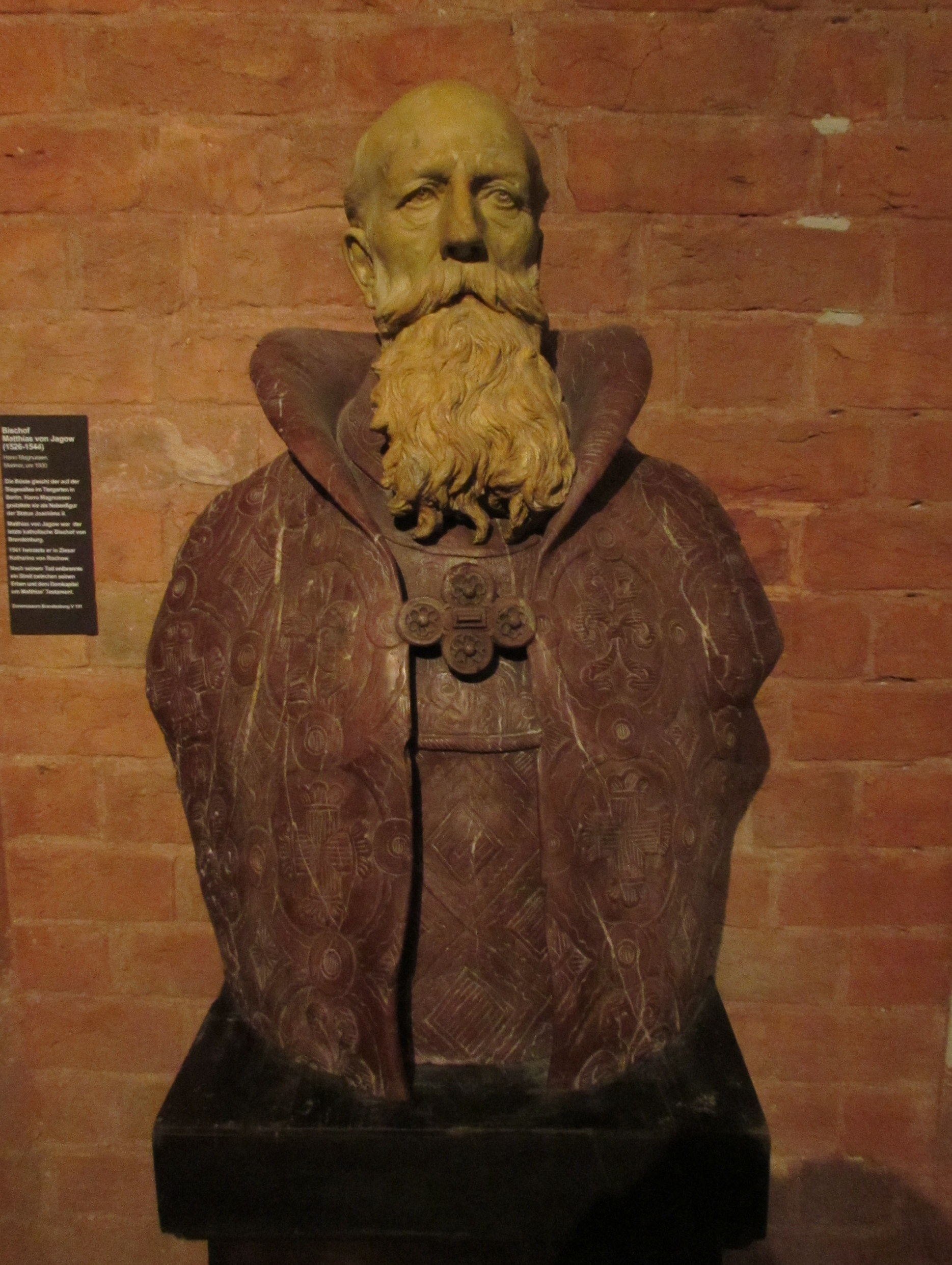
- Matthias von Jagow; of Harro Magnussen; 1900; Dommuseum Brandenburg
- Church: Lutheranism
- See: Brandenburg
- In office: 1527–1544
- Predecessor: Dietrich V von Hardenberg
- Successor: Joachim of Münsterberg-Oels

Personal details
- Born: 1490 Aulosen, Altmark
- Died: 1544 (aged 53–54) Ziesar

Matthias von Jagow (1490, Aulosen, Altmark – 1544) was a Bishop of Brandenburg and reformer in Brandenburg.

== Life and work ==
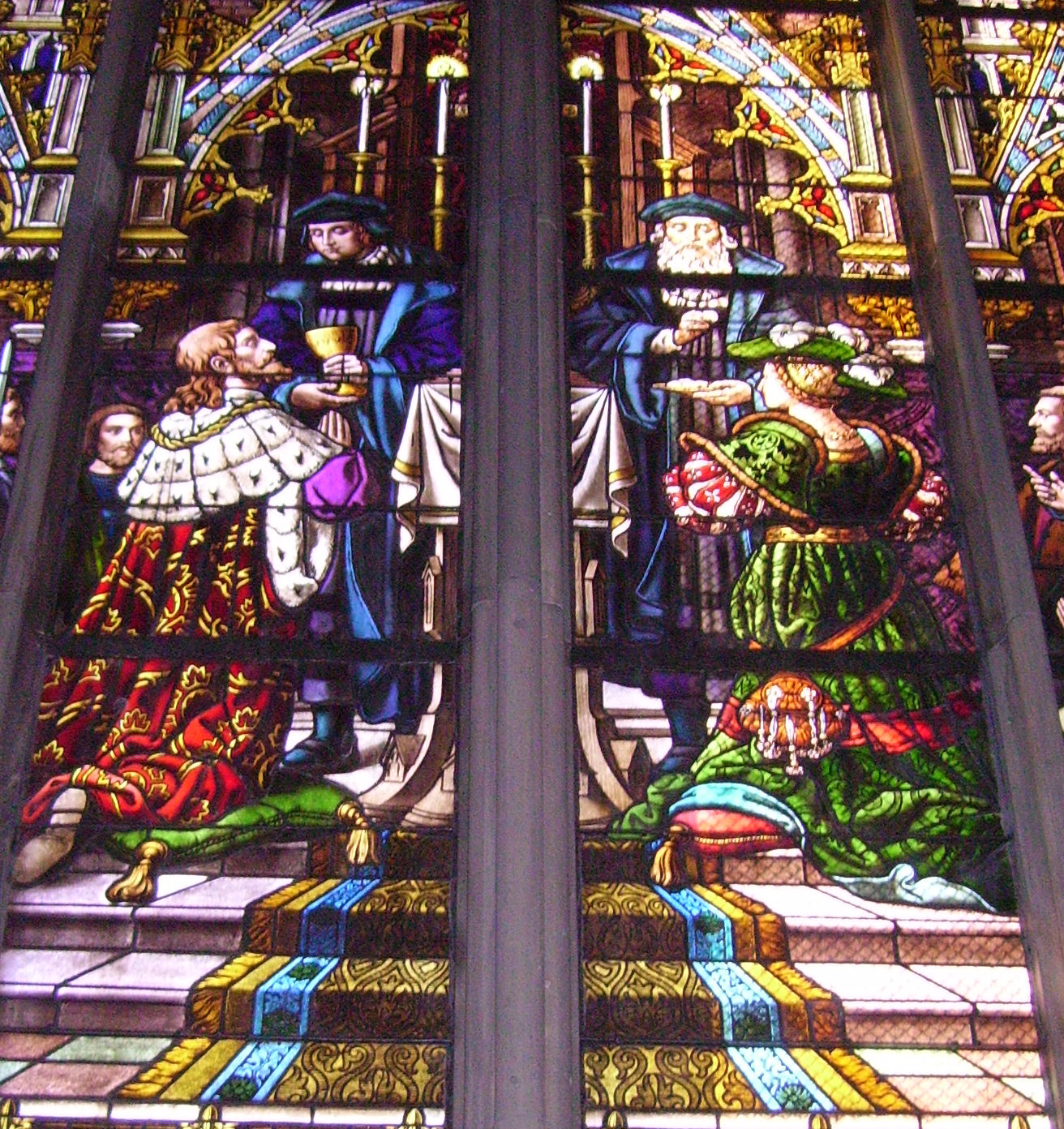
Detail of a window in the Gedächtniskirche in Speyer: Joachim II receives the communion under both kinds from Bishop Matthias von Jagow

He was a member of the old noble von Jagow family from the Altmark. He studied theology and law and was for a while, Dean of the nunnery at Spandau. In 1527, Jagow was elected as bishop of Brandenburg, as successor of Hieronymus Schulz and Dietrich V of Hardenberg, two determined opponents of Martin Luther. His election was confirmed by the pope in 1532, subject to the condition that he had to be ordinated first. Jagow, who had only received ordination to subdeacon, did not comply with this condition.

Although convinced of the need for ecclesiastical reform, he contented himself during the lifetime of anti-reform Elector Joachim I with the redress of abuses and the improvement of clergy. As the most influential advisor of his successor, Joachim II, von Jagow convinced Joachim II to convert to Lutheranism and presented the communion under both kinds to him on 1 November 1539, and to the magistrate of Berlin on 2 November. In 1541 led the first church visitation in the Mark Brandenburg, during which the Reformation was carried through. He married in 1541. Around 1535, he had a bishop's cap constructed on top of the Bergfried of his residence Ziesar Castle, as a sign of its being used by the church.

He died in 1544 in Ziesar.

== Memorial bust in the Siegesallee ==
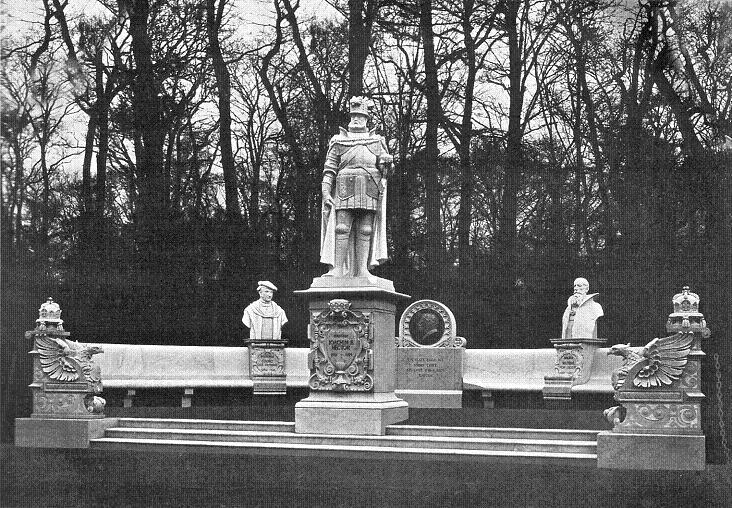
Memorial group 20 in the Siegesallee with a bust of Mathias von Jagow on the right

Sculptor Harro Magnussen designed a bust of von Jagow as a secondary character in the memorial of Joachim II in memorial group 20 on the Siegesallee in Berlin, whose central theme was a depiction of the Reformation. Magnussen presented the bishop as a bearded, elderly man with a decorative raised collar. Since no portrait was available, Magnussen asked Emperor William II to model instead of von Jagow, arguing:

I dare to make this suggestion because in Johann Sebastian Bach as a minor character in Frederick the Great so far is create a similar example, when Bach was not a Brandenburg.

The emperor denied the request.

== References and sources ==
- Uta Lehnert: Der Kaiser und die Siegesallee. Réclame Royale, Dietrich Reimer Verlag, Berlin, 1998, ISBN 3-496-01189-0.
- Rudolf Schwarze (1884). "Jagow, Matthias von" . Allgemeine Deutsche Biographie (in German). Vol. 20. Leipzig: Duncker & Humblot. pp. 654–657.
- Johannes Schultze (1974). "Jagow, Matthias von". Neue Deutsche Biographie (in German). Vol. 10. Berlin: Duncker & Humblot. pp. 300–301.

Preceded by Dietrich V von Hardenberg	Bishop of Brandenburg; 1526-1544	Succeeded by Joachim of Münsterberg-Oels
