= Battle of Burgstall, Angern and Reindorff =

Part of the Thirty Years' War (1631)

- Part of the Thirty Years' War
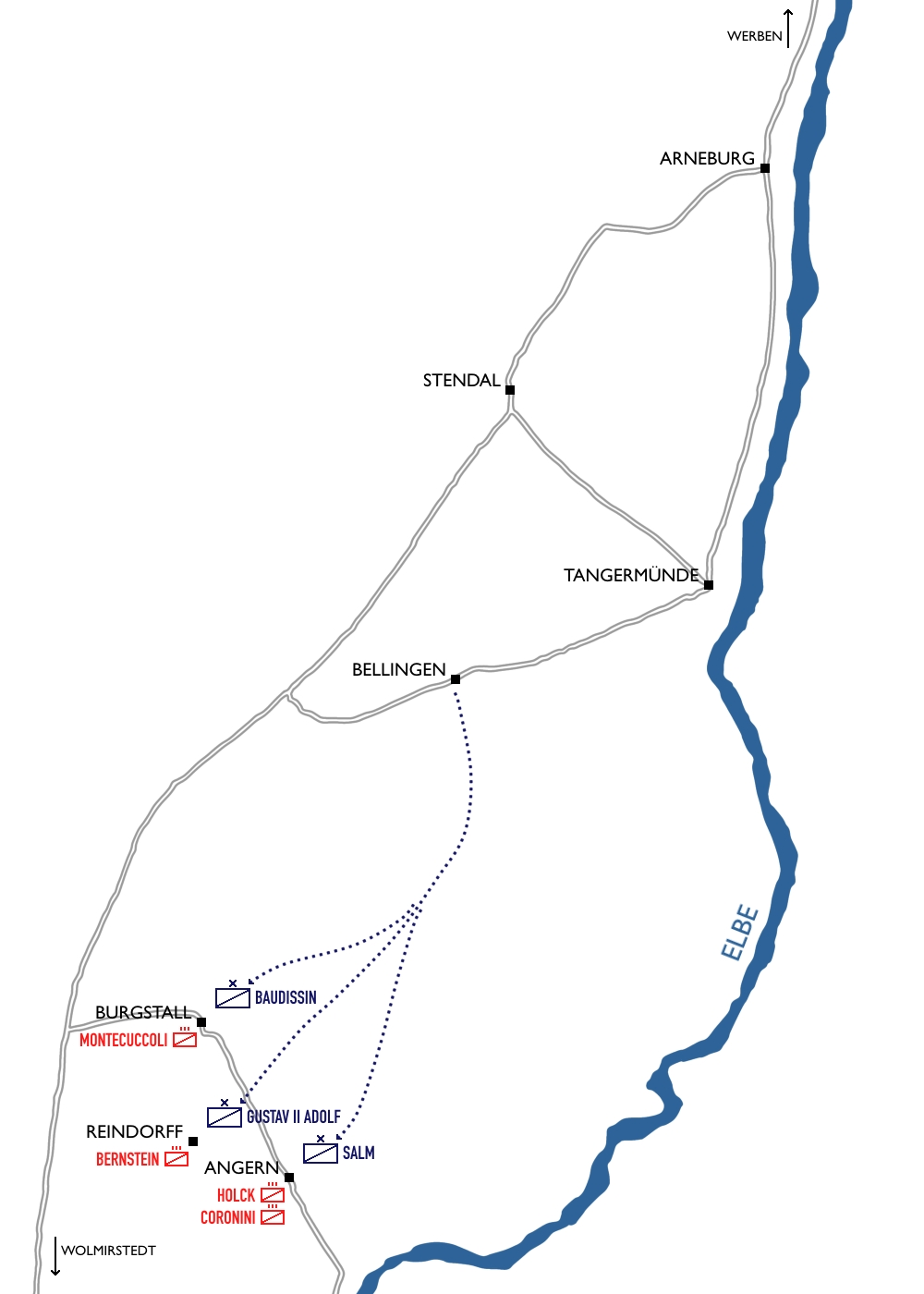
- A map of the battle
Date	17 July 1631
Location	Burgstall, Angern, and Reindorff
Result	Swedish victory

Belligerents
(yes) Swedish Empire	Holy Roman Empire; Liga

Commanders and leaders
(yes) Gustavus Adolphus (Note: Reindorff) (Swedish Empire) Wolf Heinrich von Baudissin (Note: Burgstall) (Swedish Empire) Rheingrave Otto Ludwig von Salm-Kyrburg-Mörchingen (Note: Angern)	Wratel Euseb von Bernstein † (Note: Reindorff) (Holy Roman Empire) Ernesto Montecuccoli (Note: Burgstall) (Holy Roman Empire) Heinrich Holk (Note: Angern) (Holy Roman Empire) Johann Coronini von Cronberg (Note: Angern)

Units involved
(Swedish Empire) Swedish Army; Västgöta Regiment	Liga Army (Holy Roman Empire) Imperial Army

Strength
1,500	4,000

Casualties and losses
light	More than the Swedes

The attack on Burgstall, Angern, and Reindorff was a Swedish surprise night raid against Liga and Holy Roman Empire troops during the Thirty Years' War, at the villages of Burgstall, Angern, and Reindorff near Wolmirstedt. The attack occurred on the night of July 27–28, 1631 and the resulting action was a Swedish victory that boosted their morale and disrupted Imperial supplies; additionally all three villages were burned and plundered. Present at the battle were 1,500 Swedes under Gustavus Adolphus, Wolf Heinrich von Baudissin, and Rheingrave Otto Ludwig von Salm-Kyrburg-Mörchingen and 4,000 imperials and Liga troops under Wratel Euseb von Bernstein, Ernesto Montecuccoli, Heinrich Holk, and Johann Coronini von Cronberg.

== Background ==
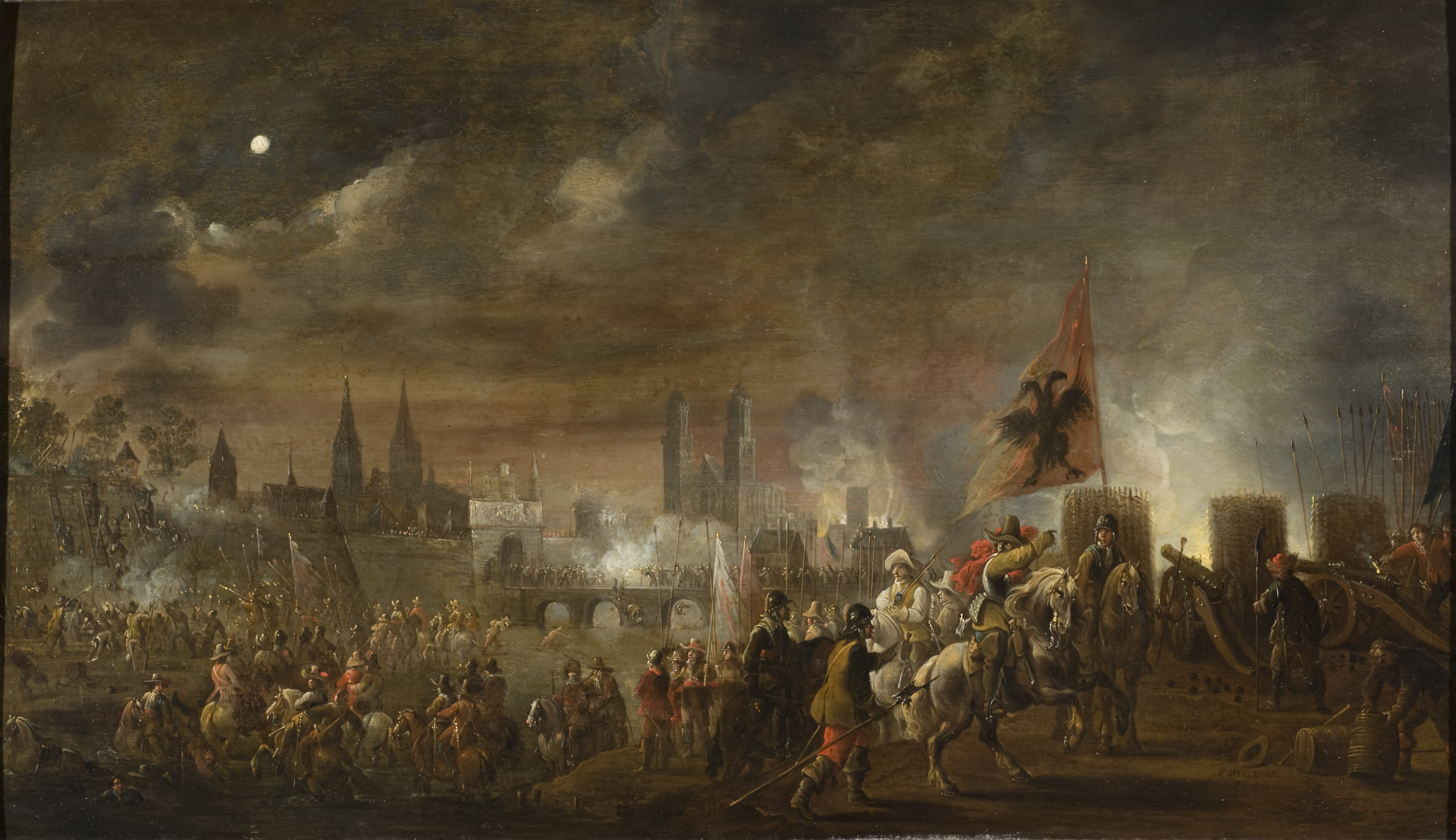
The sack of Madgeburg by Peeter Meulener

In July of 1630 Gustavus Adolphus and his Swedish Army landed on Wollin and Usedom. He then crossed the Oder and took Stettin soon Wolgast, Colberg, and many other cities in Pomerania. After the Battle of Marwitz the Imperial retreated south leaving Brandenburg exposed and soon Gustavus invaded Brandenburg and Mecklenburg. In the spring of 1631 Johann Tserclaes, Count of Tilly and Gottfried Heinrich Graf zu Pappenheim moved from their positions and took Neubrandenburg before moving south and attacked and then sacked Magdeburg, at the same time Gustavus Adolphus Stormed and sacked Frankfurt an der Oder and Küstrin in order to distract Tilly.

Following both battles Gustavus moved to Werben, where Papppenheim and Tilly attacked Werben where Gustavus had dug in, but were driven back losing 1,000. Tilly now retreated south to Magdeburg losing another 6,000 in his retreat. When Gustavus received information this information, he gathered his own cavalry in Arneburg, located between Werben and Tangermünde, which he then brought to Bellingen. The targets of his intended attack were the towns of Burgstall and Reindorff, occupied by one regiment each, and Angern, occupied by two.

Gustavus marched south with his cavalry on the night of 26 July and remained stationary until the evening of 27 July, when the attack began. Tilly had put Wratel Euseb von Bernstein, Ernesto Montecuccoli, Heinrich Holk, and Johann Coronini von Cronberg in command of the Imperials in that area.

== Battle ==
=== Intuitional movement ===
Although the imperials escaped a large defeat, the Swedes would claim a major victory both sides did not lose heavy heavy cavalry but the Swedes did capture some of the imperial supplies and took the imperial positions. The Swedes first moved out from Arneburg and split into two before meeting up again at Bellingen. Then, the Swedes moved out from Bellingen and moved in three columns.

=== Baudissin's column ===
The western one, under the command of Wolf Heinrich von Baudissin, carried out the first assault Burgstall. Most of the regiment was asleep, and had also neglected to properly guard the place, which is why it was completely surprised and scattered.

=== Gustavus's column ===
Gustavus's middle column reached Reindorff. The force there had managed to organize itself when they were awakened by the fighting at Burgstall, and the soldiers therefore initially repelled the attack. During the battle, the king was surrounded when he rode into the middle of the enemy, but was saved by Harald Stake. The commander of the Imperial-Liga army, Colonel Wratel Euseb von Bernstein, was himself shot at the same time. His soldiers then retreated.

=== Otto Ludwig's column ===
The eastern column, under the command of Rheingrave Otto Ludwig von Salm-Kyrburg-Mörchingen, was the last to attack its objective. When he reached Angern, the regiments there had organized a solid defense, and since the town was also occupied by the largest detachment, it was here that the most intense fighting took place. Even from here, however, the Liga-Imperial troops were able to escape. After the successful assault, the Swedes burned the towns and then returned north.

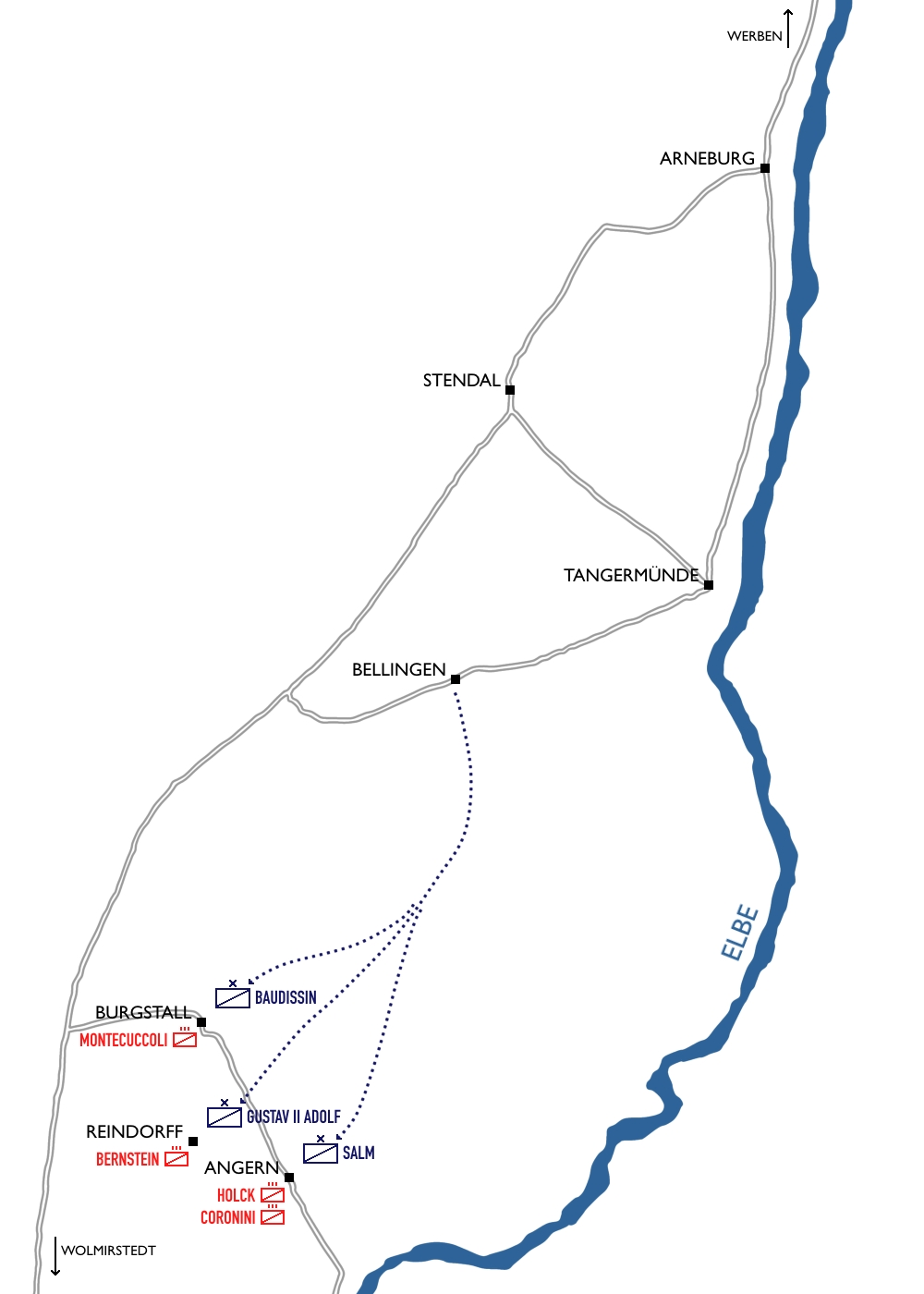
Colored map of the battles

== Aftermath ==
Though Gustavus had failed to fully defeat the imperials, but he successfully eliminated remaining enemy garrisons in the surrounding countryside with this raid. The action solidified the Swedish presence in the Archbishopric of Magdeburg and further isolated the remaining Imperial strongholds. It also showcased Swedish tactical superiority.

The surprise nighttime attack was a smaller demonstration of the Swedish army's discipline and effectiveness. The ability to carry out a coordinated nighttime assault to overrun multiple, unsuspecting garrisons highlighted the professionalism of the Swedish forces under Gustavus. The raid was a minor victory that provided a morale boost for the Protestant cause just months after the devastating loss of Magdeburg. The news of the massacre in Magdeburg had caused widespread outrage, and the quick victory over Imperial troops in nearby towns helped restore some confidence in the Swedish-led Protestant effort. Contributed to a broader strategy.

The elimination of these Imperial outposts was a stepping stone in Gustavus's wider plan to secure his foothold in northern Germany. It helped clear the way for his army to later engage the Catholic League army in the much more significant Battle of Breitenfeld (1631) in September 1631. The rout of Count Tilly at Breitenfeld was the Protestants' first major victory and cemented Sweden's status as a major power in the war.

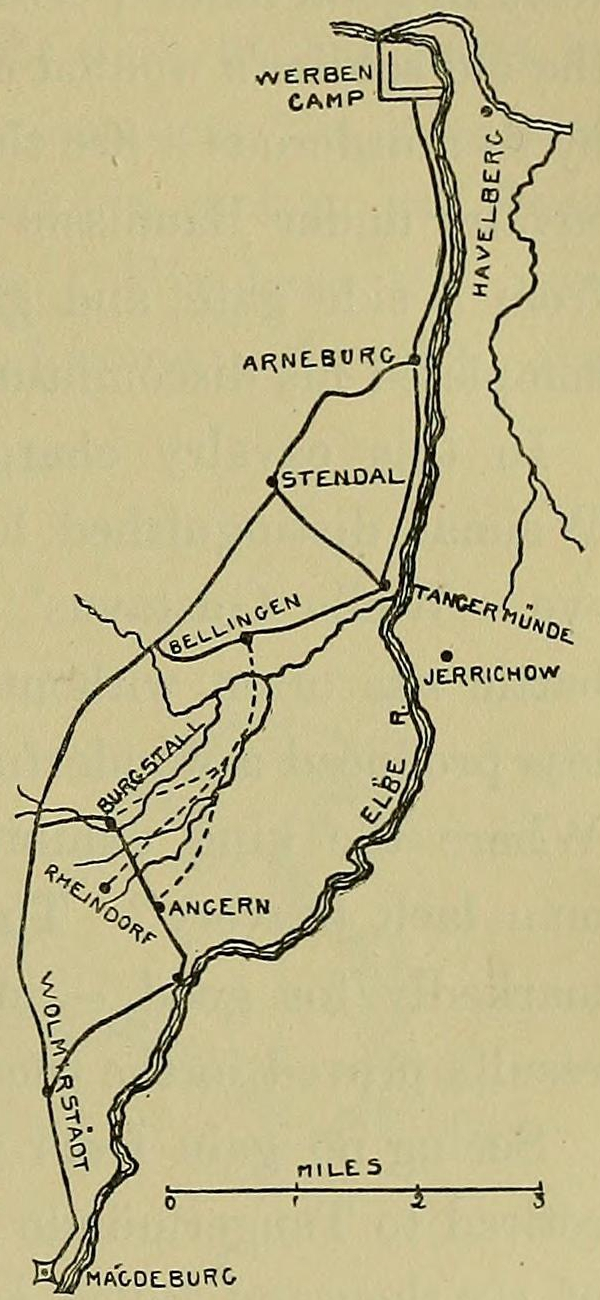
The Battles of Burgstall-Reindorff-Angern

== Bibliography ==
- Dodge, Theodore Ayrault (1895). Gustavus Adolphus; a history of the art of war from its revival after the middle ages to the end of the Spanish succession war, with a detailed account of the campaigns of the great Swede, and of the most famous campaign of Turenne, Condé, Eugene and Marlborough. With 237 charts, maps, plans of battles and tactical manoeuvres, cuts of uniforms, arms, and weapons.
- Fryxell, Anders (1862). Berättelser ur svenska historien: Gustaf II Adolf [Stories from Swedish History] (in Swedish). Vol. 6.
- Starbäck, Carl Georg (1885). Berättelser ur svenska historien: Gustaf II Adolf [Stories from Swedish History: Gustaf II Adolf] (in Swedish). Vol. 4.
- Wilson, Peter H. (2009). Europe's Tragedy: A History of the Thirty Years War. Allen Lane. ISBN 978-0-7139-9592-3.
