= Overseas radio reception center Lüchow =

German Federal Post centre, 1948–1987

Coordinates: 52.977011°N 11.224159°E

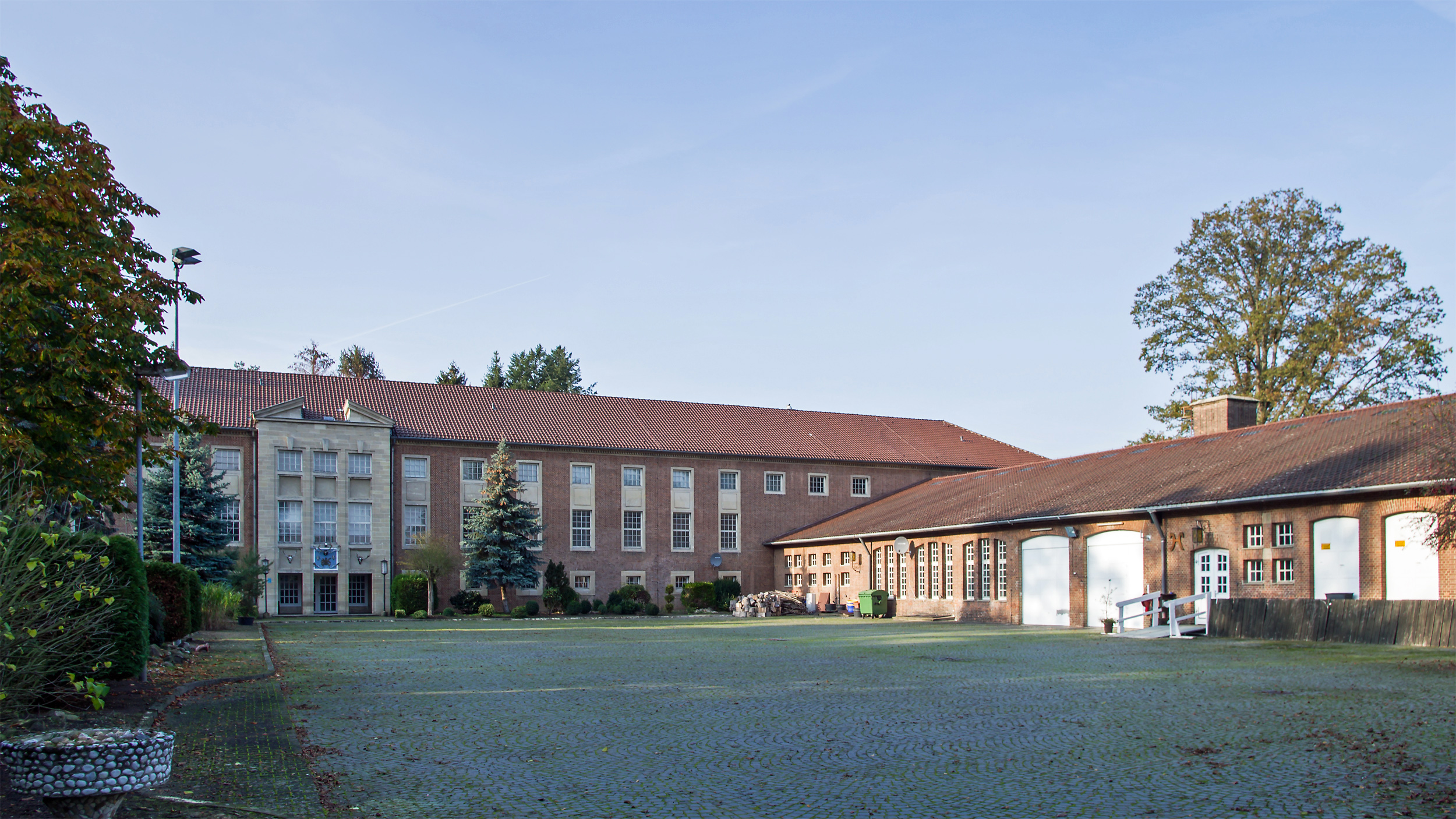
Overseas radio reception center Lüchow, main building (2019)

The Overseas radio reception center Lüchow (German: Übersee- Funkempfangsstelle Lüchow (ÜFESt or ÜEFuSt)) was one of the large radio reception centers of the German Federal Post Office for civil telecommunications use between 1948 and 1987. It was used to handle teletype, telegram and telephone services worldwide via shortwave radio.

== History ==
Until 1932, all overseas radio links were operated by the radio operating company Transradio. The main radio stations of this company were the Nauen Transmitter Station and the receiving radio station Beelitz near Berlin. Because of the growing overseas radio traffic, the Reichspostzentralamt at that time felt compelled to start planning work for a new receiving station in 1937. Various areas were examined for suitability during the planning phase. There were several conditions involved: far away from sources of interference of any kind (industry, high-voltage systems, large settlements, etc.) and the best possible soil conductivity. The choice fell on swampy terrain in Wendland, east of the city of Lüchow, a little north of the village of Woltersdorf and far away from larger settlements. A total of approx. 600 hectares (2.3 sq mi) was acquired. The site got partially dehydrated by the Luciekanal to Jeetzel river. Construction of the station building began in 1938/39; they were completed in 1942. The radio equipment, including the antennas, was supplied by Telefunken and set up in the years up to 1944. In December 1944, the receiving radio station officially went into operation. During the years up to 1947, the site was not used as an operating point for civil radio communications due to the war restrictions.

== The operation ==
=== Radio operation ===
It was until the end of 1947 that the originally planned civil use as an overseas radio station began with the opening of the first telephony radio line Hamburg - Rio de Janeiro. It was followed by the line to Buenos Aires in May 1948. At the end of 1948 there were already seven fixed radio lines overseas and the first European connections to Lisbon and Barcelona had gone into operation. The majority of the connections were telegraph connections in which the transmission of telegrams was carried out manually using Morse code radio. Until 1951 this was an additional task to the actual tasks of the maritime radio operated at the coastal radio station Norddeich Radio (Radio call sign was DAN).

==== Telegram service ====
From 1950 there were a total of 24 fixed radio lines, including to Ankara, Bangkok, Bombay, Buenos Aires, Cairo, Calcutta, Lima, Manila, Osaka and Seoul. At that time, an impressive 12,000-14,000 wireless telegrams were processed every month. To get an idea of the qualifications of the radio operators, a 32-word telegram can be heard here as an example. The telegrams had to be recorded without errors and when they were recorded they had to be written immediately with a typewriter or telex for transmission to the telegraph office in Hamburg. Not an easy task with a character speed of 125 characters / minute and reception impairments due to fading and background noise.

Audio example: This is a telegram of 32 words, in Morse code with 125 characters / min over shortwave

The example takes only about 90 seconds. However, one shift lasted eight hours, including short breaks. The quality of the telegram recording should not decrease in the course of a shift. This not only required a lot of practice, but also a special talent. In addition to the telegram acceptance, telegrams were also sent. The characters were given by hand with a Morse key at the same pace. Because of its precision, the Junker MT Morse key was mostly used. Most of the radio operators previously worked on ships or at a coast radio station. In 1952, the last Morse telegraphy connections to Rio and Lima were switched to radio telex and the highly qualified radio operators required until then were no longer necessary. The total number of radio lines rose to over 40 by 1953.

==== The end of the short-wave transmission ====
Before the closure of the sister station ÜEFuSt Eschborn near Frankfurt at the end of 1969, Lüchow took over the last eight lines from there. This then resulted in 33 connections with a total of 8 telephone channels and 119 telex channels. Since the beginning of the 1970s, shortwave radio has increasingly lost its importance due to the advancing global networking with overseas cable and satellite connections. At the end of 1973 there were only 20 lines in Lüchow and in 1986 only one telex connection to Kabul/ Afghanistan. This was finally shut down in the same year as the last connection and thus the operation finally stopped.

=== Radio weather observation ===
In addition to the reception service for the telephone and telex lines, a radio weather observation center was set up in 1966. At that time it took over the tasks from the position at Detmold. The collected radio weather data was passed on from here to the Central Telecommunications Office (German: Fernmeldetechnisches Zentralamt, (FTZ)) at Darmstadt and there combined with the data from other offices to form a radio weather forecast. On end of the 1970s this service at Lüchow was given up for cost reasons and relocated to the evaluation center at Darmstadt.

=== Operating modes ===
- A1 Morse code in hand recording for transmission of telegrams
- A1A Morse code machine transmission
- F1 telex transmission, 1 channel
- F6 / F6A telegraph transmission, WTK with 2, 4 or 8 channels (WTK = alternating current telegraph device for shortwave radio links)
- A3J telephony single sideband
- A7A Teletype MUX single sideband with reduced carrier
- A9B transmission of broadcasts with different sidebands and reduced carrier (telephony / telex)

== Equipment park ==
=== Antennas ===
Spatial arrangement of the large diamonds at the Lüchow radio station (1953)

It started in 1949 with 3 horizontal dipoles, 13 large rhombuses for the frequency range from 6 to 26 MHz and one omnidirectional antenna. In 1950 the antenna park was expanded to include 8 dipoles, 17 rhombuses and a cross frame antenna for long waves. In 1952 another 9 rhombs followed. In the final stage, a total of 44 antennas were in operation. The associated antenna distributor ("antenna station") was housed in a circular extension to the reception hall. The floor was decorated with a compass rose, the orientation of which was roughly based on the assignment of the distributor with the antennas. The distributor was designed for the distribution of up to 100 antennas to 120 receivers. The rhombuses had a design frequency of 18 MHz with a gain of approx. 20 dB. The antennas, each 180 metres (200 yd) long, were suspended at a height of 21 metres (23 yd) above the ground. 12 antennas could be used in both directions. For each direction there were two antennas with a distance of several wavelengths in the receiving direction, so that they could be used for a diversity-receiving. A specialty was the interconnection of two rhombs (antennas 25 and 26 in the direction of 232 °) in a test arrangement by Telefunken to form a MUSA ( Multiple Unit Steerable Antenna) according to an invention by Harald T. Friis. The experiment was terminated for economic reasons, the antennas remained on site for further use.

==== The antennas with targets and distances ====
Receipt of	Azimuth Degr.	Distance [km /mi]	Rhombus No.	Diversity with no.
Oslo	6	663 kilometres (412 mi)	8	7
Stockholm	38	790 kilometres (490 mi)	23	24
Helsinki	40	1,161 kilometres (721 mi)	23	24
Osaka	44	8,879 kilometres (5,517 mi)	23	24
Seoul	48	8,187 kilometres (5,087 mi)	23	24
Taipeh	59	9,041 kilometres (5,618 mi)	21	22
Manila	66	9,966 kilometres (6,193 mi)	21	22
Moscow	70	1,733 kilometres (1,077 mi)	21	22
Melbourne	80	16,205 kilometres (10,069 mi)	19	20
Bangkok	82	8,767 kilometres (5,448 mi)	19	20
Calcutta	86	7,178 kilometres (4,460 mi)	19	20
Bandung	88	11,157 kilometres (6,933 mi)	17	18
Kabul	90	4,931 kilometres (3,064 mi)	17	18
Karachi	101	5,734 kilometres (3,563 mi)	15	16
Bombay	101	6,423 kilometres (3,991 mi)	15	16
Tehran	105	3,659 kilometres (2,274 mi)	15	16
Berlin	107	149 kilometres (93 mi)	15	16
Baghdad	116	3,398 kilometres (2,111 mi)	13	14
Ankara	123	2,185 kilometres (1,358 mi)	11	12
Bucharest	125	1,448 kilometres (900 mi)	11	12
Beirut	128	2,859 kilometres (1,777 mi)	11	12
Jeddah	134	4,383 kilometres (2,723 mi)	9	10
Belgrade	140	1,123 kilometres (698 mi)	9	10
Cairo	140	3,003 kilometres (1,866 mi)	9	10
Vienna	140	805 kilometres (500 mi)	9	10
Athena	145	1,922 kilometres (1,194 mi)	9	10
Addis Ababa	148	5,324 kilometres (3,308 mi)	9	10
Rome	170	1,364 kilometres (848 mi)	7	8
Cape Town	173	9,811 kilometres (6,096 mi)	7	8
Leopoldville	173	6,506 kilometres (4,043 mi)	7	8
Barcelona	205	1,509 kilometres (938 mi)	5	6
Madrid	219	1,800 kilometres (1,100 mi)	3	4
Rio de Janeiro	227	9,911 kilometres (6,158 mi)	3	4
Buenos Aires	231	12,023 kilometres (7,471 mi)	1	2
Lisbon	234	2,266 kilometres (1,408 mi)	1	2
Asuncion	237	10,881 kilometres (6,761 mi)	1	2
Santiago	242	12,373 kilometres (7,688 mi)	22	21
Lima	262	11,109 kilometres (6,903 mi)	20	19
Bogota	268	9,182 kilometres (5,705 mi)	18	17
New York	293	6,063 kilometres (3,767 mi)	14	13
Montreal	297	5,696 kilometres (3,539 mi)	14	13
Chicago	302	6,780 kilometres (4,210 mi)	12	11

=== Receivers ===
In 1948 the equipment consisted of 30 Telefunken E459 large station receivers and was constantly expanded and renewed. In 1969, 77 receivers were installed:

- 1 Telefunken long wave receiver EST 108 LW / R
- 7 × 2 Telefunken diversity receivers EST 305 KW
- 9 × 2 Siemens diversity receivers 2 KW 1/3
- 8 Telefunken single sideband receivers EST304KW
- 8 Siemens single sideband receivers KW 2/6
- 8 × 2 Siemens double diversity receivers Funk 125E101a
- 5 × 2 Siemens double diversity receivers Funk 125E103b

In the late 1970s, the first fully transistorized receivers were added with six Telefunken E1501 receivers.

== Subsequent use ==
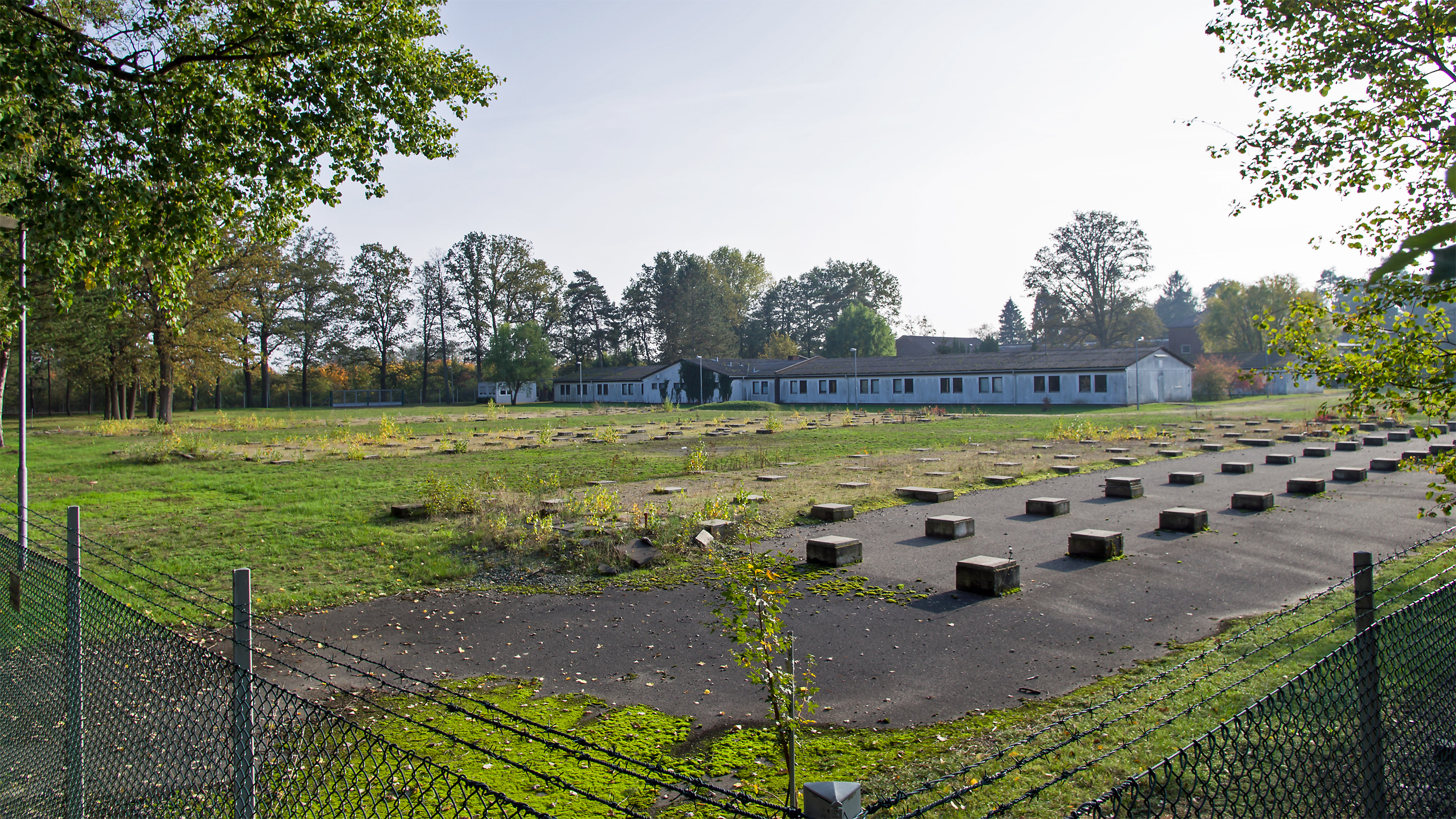
Remnants of the foundation of the container village (2019)

From 1979 the area was also used by the Lower Saxony police who were deployed in the protests against the nearby Gorleben nuclear waste storage facility and the Castor transports. After renovation work, these initially occupied some of the ÜFESt rooms. Later, additional container buildings were built in the outdoor area, which offered accommodation for up to 1000 emergency services. In the summer of 2005, the residential containers were destroyed by a major fire. During the refugee crisis in Germany in 2015/ 2016, the area served as emergency accommodation for several hundred refugees. During this time, there were other smaller fires. The subsequent use as refugee accommodation ended on September 30, 2016.

== Literature ==
- Ernst Bornemann: Bridge to the World: The Overseas Radio Receiving Center Lüchow-Woltersdorf. A chronicle from 1938 to 1988 . 1st edition. Projekt-Verlag Cornelius, 2008, ISBN 978-3-86634-485-3 (in German).
