= Holke =

Holke is a surname. Notable people with the surname include:

- Heinrich Holk (1599–1633), also spelled Holke, a 17th-century Danish-German mercenary
- Walter Holke (1892–1954), a 20th-century American baseball player
