= Bertkow =

- Ortsteil of Goldbeck
- Interactive map of Bertkow
- Location within Germany Location within Saxony-Anhalt
- Coordinates: 52°43′N 11°54′E
- Country: Germany
- State: Saxony-Anhalt
- District: Stendal
- Town: Goldbeck

Area
  - Total: 12.56 km^{2} (4.85 sq mi)
- Elevation: 29 m (95 ft)

Population (2006-12-31)
  - Total: 319
  - Density: 25.4/km^{2} (65.8/sq mi)
- Time zone: UTC+01:00 (CET)
  - Summer (DST): UTC+02:00 (CEST)
- Postal codes: 39596
- Dialling codes: 039388
- Website: www.arneburg-goldbeck.de

Bertkow is a village and a former municipality in the district of Stendal, in Saxony-Anhalt, Germany. Since 1 January 2009, it is part of the municipality Goldbeck.
