= Baudissin =

German noble family

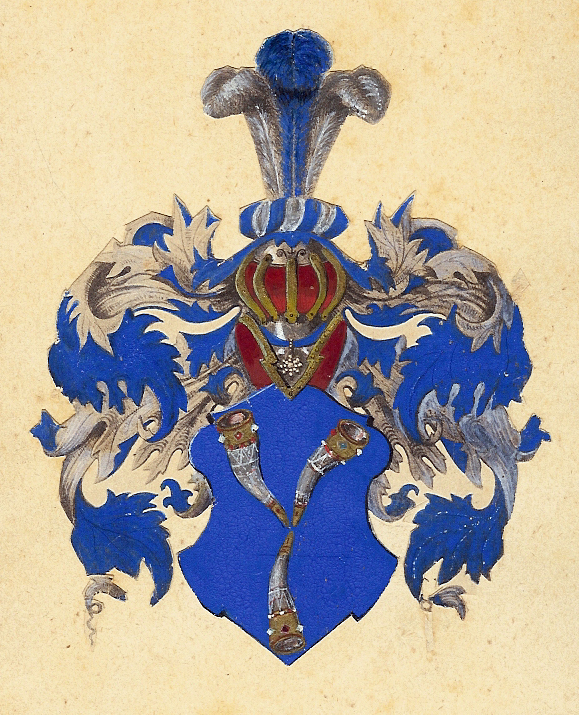
The coat of arms of the Baudissin-family.

The Baudissin family is a German noble family of Sorbian origin, first mentioned in 1326 in Upper Lusatia, now part of Saxony. At the time Bautzen, the district capital, was called Budissin, whence the name originated. All name bearers, including those of family lines like Baudissin-Zinzendorf and Baudissin-Zinzendorf-Pottendorf, are Counts or Countesses.

== History ==
Wolf Heinrich von Baudissin married into a Rantzau noble family from Holstein and became the progenitor of all family members living today. From this time on most Baudissins settled in Holstein and other parts of Denmark and often served the Danish kings as diplomats, officers and administrators. His grandson Wulf Hinrich (1671–1748) was another military leader and was made a hereditary Imperial Count on 28 February 1741 by the prince-elector of Saxony, Duke Frederick Augustus II (King Augustus III of Poland), for his services and thus became the first Graf von Baudissin.

The family has since brought forth numerous diplomats, military and civil officers, administrators, advisers to kings and emperors, writers, artists, journalists and lawyers. The families Baudissin and their Danish branch of "Bauditz" are listed in joint entries in the 1909, 1911, 1915 and 1959 editions of the Danmarks Adels Aarbog ("Danish nobility yearbook").

== Notable members ==
- Adelbert Heinrich Graf von Baudissin (1820-1871), writer
- Wolf Heinrich von Baudissin (1579-1646), military leader
- Wolf Heinrich Graf von Baudissin (1789-1878), Danish and German diplomat, writer, and translator
- Adalbert Heinrich Graf von Baudissin (1820–1871), journalist, war correspondent, writer, and publisher
- Wolf Ernst Hugo Emil Graf von Baudissin (1867–1926), officer and writer
- Wolf Wilhelm Friedrich von Baudissin (1847–1927), theologian and Old Testament scholar
- Wolf Graf von Baudissin (1907-1993), German general and professor of International Peace Studies.
- Franz von Baudissen (1997-now), German entrepreneur
