= Behrendorf =

- Stadtteil of Werben
- Interactive map of Behrendorf
- Location within Germany Location within Saxony-Anhalt
- Coordinates: 52°49′26″N 11°57′37″E
- Country: Germany
- State: Saxony-Anhalt
- District: Stendal
- Town: Werben

Area
  - Total: 23.64 km^{2} (9.13 sq mi)
- Elevation: 23 m (75 ft)

Population (2006-12-31)
  - Total: 505
  - Density: 21.4/km^{2} (55.3/sq mi)
- Time zone: UTC+01:00 (CET)
  - Summer (DST): UTC+02:00 (CEST)
- Postal codes: 39606
- Dialling codes: 039393
- Vehicle registration: SDL

Behrendorf (German pronunciation: [ˈbeːʁəndɔʁf]) is a village and a former municipality in the district of Stendal, in Saxony-Anhalt, Germany. Since 1 January 2010, it is part of the town Werben.
