= Rochau =

- Municipality
- Coat of arms

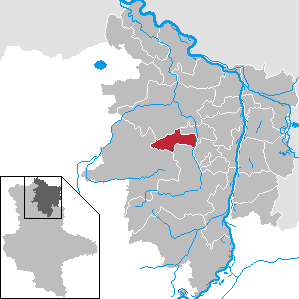
- Location of Rochau within Stendal district
- Interactive map of Rochau
- Location within Germany Location within Saxony-Anhalt
- Coordinates: 52°42′36″N 11°45′0″E
- Country: Germany
- State: Saxony-Anhalt
- District: Stendal
- Municipal assoc.: Arneburg-Goldbeck

Government
  - Mayor (2022–29): Dirk Zeidler

Area
  - Total: 39.01 km^{2} (15.06 sq mi)
- Elevation: 38 m (125 ft)

Population (2025-12-31)
  - Total: 965
  - Density: 24.7/km^{2} (64.1/sq mi)
- Time zone: UTC+01:00 (CET)
  - Summer (DST): UTC+02:00 (CEST)
- Postal codes: 39579
- Dialling codes: 039328
- Vehicle registration: SDL
- Website: www.arneburg-goldbeck.de

Rochau (German pronunciation: [ˈʁɔxaʊ]) is a municipality in the district of Stendal, in Saxony-Anhalt, Germany. In January 2011 it absorbed the former municipality Klein Schwechten.
