= Wolf Graf von Baudissin =

German general and developer of the "citizens in uniform" concept of Bundeswehr

Generalleutnant a.D. Prof. Wolf Graf von Baudissin
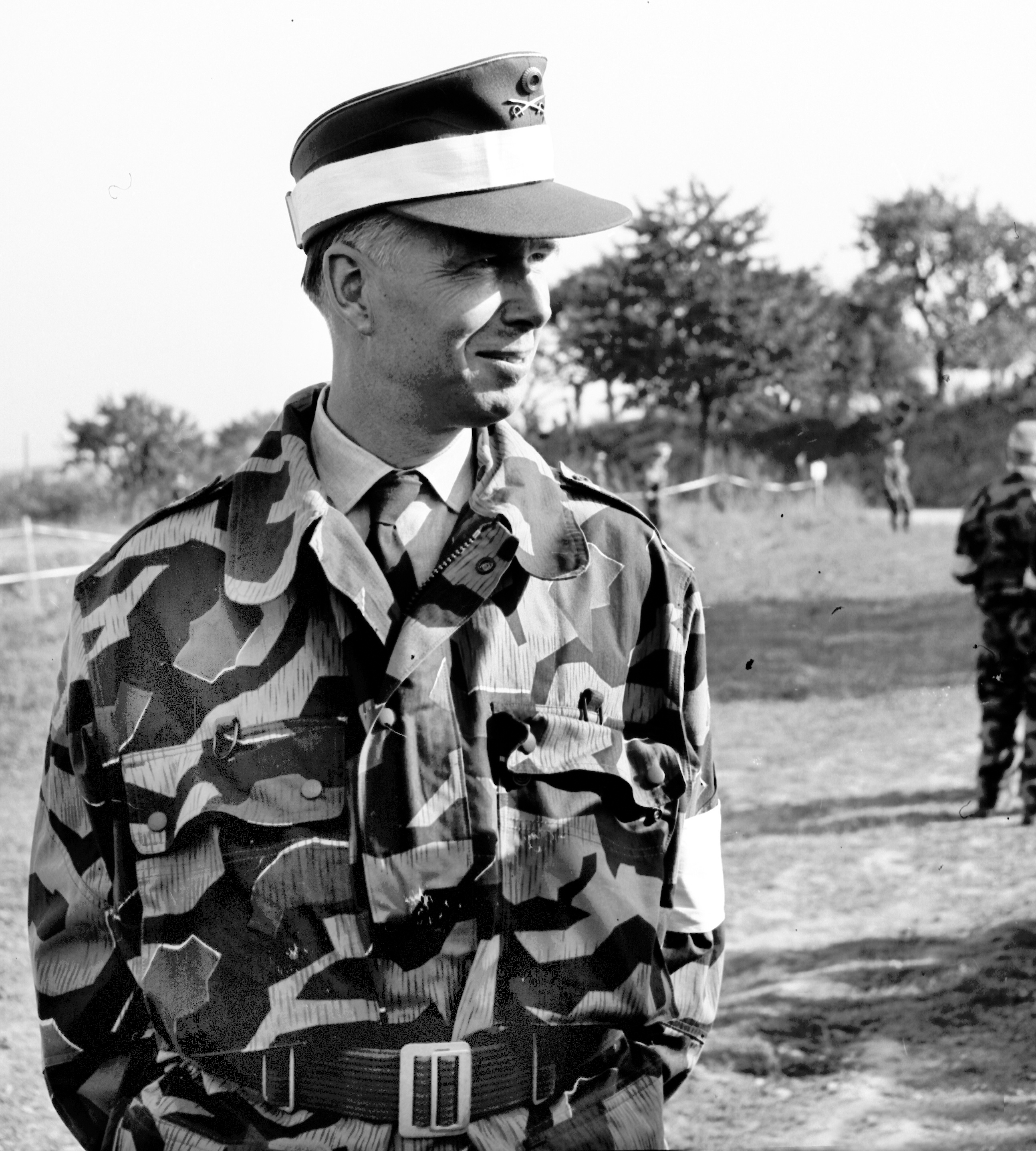
- Wolf Graf von Baudissin
- Born: 8 May 1907; Trier, Germany
- Died: 5 June 1993 (aged 86); Hamburg, Germany
- Spouse: Dagmar Burggräfin zu Dohna-Schlodien
- Military career
- Allegiance: Weimar Republic (to 1933); Nazi Germany (to 1945); West Germany (to 1967)
- Branch: German Army
- Service years: 1926–45, 1951–67
- Rank: Generalleutnant
- Commands: NATO Defense College, Paris
- Awards: Order of Merit of the Federal Republic of Germany, Grand Cross; Theodor Heuss Prize; Freiherr vom Stein Prize; Heinz Herbert Karry Prize; Iron Cross, 1st Class
- Memorials: "Forum Wolf Graf v. Baudissin", Koblenz; Generalleutnant-Graf-von-Baudissin-Kaserne, Hamburg
- Other work: Institute for Peace Research and Security Policy, Hamburg
- Website: Wolf von Baudissin

Wolf Graf von Baudissin (8 May 1907 – 5 June 1993) was a German general, military planner and peace researcher. He was one of the developers of the concepts of Innere Führung (officially translated as "leadership development and civic education") and Staatsbürger in Uniform ("citizens in uniform"), the two lead concepts of the modern German Bundeswehr.

== Early life ==
Baudissin was born in Trier into the Baudissin family. He studied law, history and economics in Berlin.

In World War II, Baudissin served as Hauptmann im Generalstab (captain with the General Staff) at the personal request of General Erwin Rommel. He was captured by Australian troops in North Africa in 1941, and sent to Australia, where he was held in the Dhurringile prisoner-of-war camp in Victoria. While a POW, he was promoted to major. At Dhurringile, Baudissin developed the idea of the Kriegsgefangenenuniversität ("prisoner-of-war university"). He organized classes in which German prisoners with particular knowledge or expertise taught their comrades in various subjects and prepared them for life after the war. Baudissin was released in 1947.

== Career in the Bundeswehr ==
In October 1950, Baudissin worked on the secret Himmeroder Denkschrift ("Himmerod Memorandum"), a paper advocating German rearmament. In 1956 he helped to create the new German armed forces, the Bundeswehr, receiving the rank of colonel, and soon headed a tank brigade. In 1963, he was promoted to lieutenant general and was appointed Commandant of the NATO Defence College in Paris, serving until 1965. Baudissin then served as Deputy Chief of Staff at Supreme Headquarters Allied Powers Europe (SHAPE), the headquarters of NATO.

== After the Bundeswehr ==
Baudissin retired in 1967 and became an active member of the Social Democratic Party of Germany the following year. He actively supported Willy Brandt's bid for chancellorship in 1972.

From 1971 to 1984, Baudissin served as founding director for the Institut für Friedensforschung und Sicherheitspolitik ("Institute for Peace Research and Security Policy") at the University of Hamburg. In 1979, he was made professor. From 1980 to 1986, he served as a professor of social science at the University of the Bundeswehr in Hamburg. With the concepts of Innere Führung and citizen in uniform he advocated to assure that the norms and values of the German Basic Law were embedded in the new German armed forces following World War II. Baudissin died in Hamburg in 1993.

== Awards and honors ==
Baudissin was a member of the peace movement group Generale für den Frieden ("Generals for Peace"). In 1967, he was awarded the Theodor Heuss Prize and the Bundesverdienstkreuz (Great Federal Cross of Merit), with stars and sash.

On 19 April 1994, the hall of the Bundeswehr's Zentrum Innere Führung in Koblenz was renamed "Forum Wolf Graf von Baudissin". On 7 June of the same year, the "General Schwartzkopff Barracks" in Osdorf were renamed "Lieutenant General Graf von Baudissin Barracks".

== Personal life ==
His wife was the sculptor Dagmar Gräfin zu Dohna-Schlodien (1907–1995). She was the daughter of jurist and politician Alexander Graf zu Dohna-Schlodien.
