= Arneburg-Goldbeck =

- Verbandsgemeinde
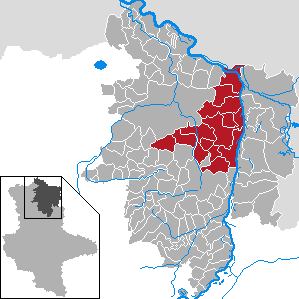
- Map of Stendal highlighting Arneburg-Goldbeck
- Interactive map of Arneburg-Goldbeck
- Location within Germany Location within Saxony-Anhalt
- Coordinates: 52°43′N 11°51′E
- Country: Germany
- State: Saxony-Anhalt
- District: Stendal
- Seat: Goldbeck
- Subdivisions: 8 municipalities

Area
  - Total: 304.28 km^{2} (117.48 sq mi)

Population (2025-12-31)
  - Total: 8,181
  - Density: 26.89/km^{2} (69.64/sq mi)
- Time zone: UTC+01:00 (CET)
  - Summer (DST): UTC+02:00 (CEST)
- Website: www.arneburg-goldbeck.de

Arneburg-Goldbeck is a Verbandsgemeinde ("collective municipality") in the district of Stendal, in Saxony-Anhalt, Germany. Before 1 January 2010, it was a Verwaltungsgemeinschaft. It is situated on the left bank of the Elbe, north of Stendal. The seat of the Verbandsgemeinde is in Goldbeck. Arneburg-Goldbeck consists of the following municipalities:

- Arneburg
- Eichstedt
- Goldbeck
- Hassel
- Hohenberg-Krusemark
- Iden
- Rochau
- Werben
