= Klein Schwechten =

- Ortsteil of Rochau
- Interactive map of Klein Schwechten
- Location within Germany Location within Saxony-Anhalt
- Coordinates: 52°43′N 11°50′E
- Country: Germany
- State: Saxony-Anhalt
- District: Stendal
- Municipality: Rochau

Area
  - Total: 18.91 km^{2} (7.30 sq mi)
- Elevation: 26 m (85 ft)

Population (2009-12-31)
  - Total: 493
  - Density: 26.1/km^{2} (67.5/sq mi)
- Time zone: UTC+01:00 (CET)
  - Summer (DST): UTC+02:00 (CEST)
- Postal codes: 39579
- Dialling codes: 039388
- Vehicle registration: SDL
- Website: www.arneburg-goldbeck.de

Klein Schwechten is a village and a former municipality in the district of Stendal, in Saxony-Anhalt, Germany. Since 1 January 2011, it is part of the municipality Rochau.
