= Sandauerholz =

- Ortsteil of Iden
- Interactive map of Sandauerholz
- Location within Germany Location within Saxony-Anhalt
- Coordinates: 52°47′23″N 12°0′0″E
- Country: Germany
- State: Saxony-Anhalt
- District: Stendal
- Town: Iden

Area
  - Total: 16.17 km^{2} (6.24 sq mi)
- Elevation: 25 m (82 ft)

Population (2006-12-31)
  - Total: 162
  - Density: 10.0/km^{2} (25.9/sq mi)
- Time zone: UTC+01:00 (CET)
  - Summer (DST): UTC+02:00 (CEST)
- Postal codes: 39606
- Dialling codes: 039390
- Vehicle registration: SDL
- Website: www.arneburg-goldbeck.de

Sandauerholz is a village and a former municipality in the district of Stendal, in Saxony-Anhalt, Germany. Since 1 July 2009, it is part of the municipality Iden.
