= Sanne, Germany =

Sanne
- Ortsteil of Hassel
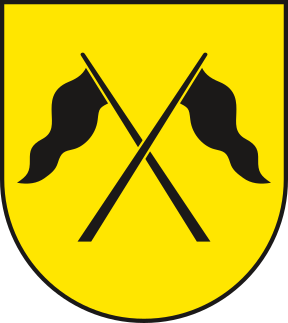
- Coat of arms
- Interactive map of Sanne
- Location within Germany Location within Saxony-Anhalt
- Coordinates: 52°39′29″N 11°56′20″E
- Country: Germany
- State: Saxony-Anhalt
- District: Stendal
- Town: Hassel

Area
  - Total: 8.57 km^{2} (3.31 sq mi)
- Elevation: 33 m (108 ft)

Population (2006-12-31)
  - Total: 162
  - Density: 18.9/km^{2} (49.0/sq mi)
- Time zone: UTC+01:00 (CET)
  - Summer (DST): UTC+02:00 (CEST)
- Postal codes: 39596
- Dialling codes: 039321
- Vehicle registration: SDL
- Website: www.arneburg-goldbeck.de

Sanne is a village and a former municipality in the district of Stendal, in Saxony-Anhalt, Germany. Since 1 July 2009, it is part of the municipality Hassel.
