= Iden, Saxony-Anhalt =

Iden
- Municipality
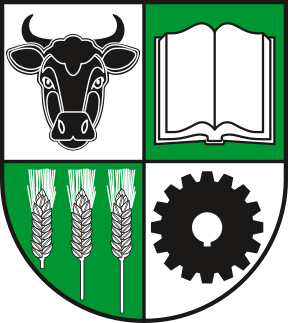
- Coat of arms

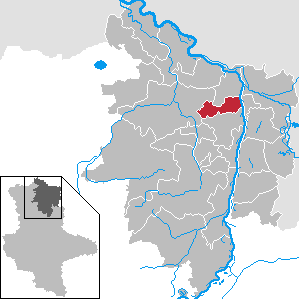
- Location of Iden within Stendal district
- Interactive map of Iden
- Location within Germany Location within Saxony-Anhalt
- Coordinates: 52°47′N 11°55′E
- Country: Germany
- State: Saxony-Anhalt
- District: Stendal
- Municipal assoc.: Arneburg-Goldbeck

Government
  - Mayor (2019–26): Norbert Kuhlmann

Area
  - Total: 37.37 km^{2} (14.43 sq mi)
- Elevation: 22 m (72 ft)

Population (2025-12-31)
  - Total: 711
  - Density: 19.0/km^{2} (49.3/sq mi)
- Time zone: UTC+01:00 (CET)
  - Summer (DST): UTC+02:00 (CEST)
- Postal codes: 39606
- Dialling codes: 039390
- Vehicle registration: SDL
- Website: www.arneburg-goldbeck.de

Iden (German pronunciation: [ˈiːdn̩]) is a municipality in the district of Stendal, in Saxony-Anhalt, Germany. In July 2009 it absorbed the former municipality Sandauerholz.
