= Hassel, Saxony-Anhalt =

Hassel
- Municipality
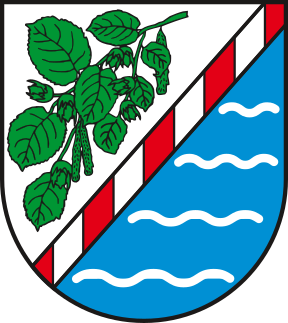
- Coat of arms

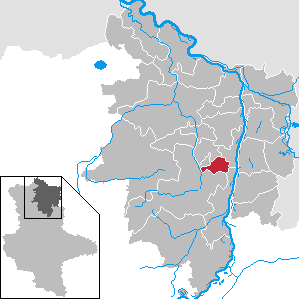
- Location of Hassel within Stendal district
- Interactive map of Hassel
- Location within Germany Location within Saxony-Anhalt
- Coordinates: 52°38′5″N 11°55′59″E
- Country: Germany
- State: Saxony-Anhalt
- District: Stendal
- Municipal assoc.: Arneburg-Goldbeck

Government
  - Mayor (2019–26): Alf Werner Diedrich

Area
  - Total: 20.57 km^{2} (7.94 sq mi)
- Elevation: 35 m (115 ft)

Population (2025-12-31)
  - Total: 910
  - Density: 44/km^{2} (110/sq mi)
- Time zone: UTC+01:00 (CET)
  - Summer (DST): UTC+02:00 (CEST)
- Postal codes: 39596
- Dialling codes: 03931, 039321
- Vehicle registration: SDL
- Website: www.arneburg-goldbeck.de

Hassel (German pronunciation: [ˈhasl̩]) is a municipality in the district of Stendal, in Saxony-Anhalt, Germany. In July 2009 it absorbed the former municipality Sanne.
