= Goldbeck =

- Municipality
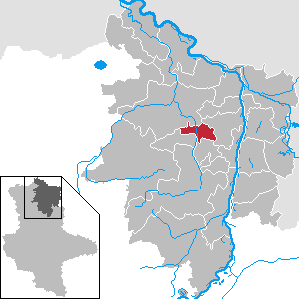
- Location of Goldbeck within Stendal district
- Interactive map of Goldbeck
- Location within Germany Location within Saxony-Anhalt
- Coordinates: 52°43′N 11°51′E
- Country: Germany
- State: Saxony-Anhalt
- District: Stendal
- Municipal assoc.: Arneburg-Goldbeck

Government
  - Mayor (2021–28): Christian Hermann Masche

Area
  - Total: 26.85 km^{2} (10.37 sq mi)
- Elevation: 26 m (85 ft)

Population (2025-12-31)
  - Total: 1,363
  - Density: 50.76/km^{2} (131.5/sq mi)
- Time zone: UTC+01:00 (CET)
  - Summer (DST): UTC+02:00 (CEST)
- Postal codes: 39596
- Dialling codes: 039388
- Vehicle registration: SDL
- Website: www.arneburg-goldbeck.de

Goldbeck (German pronunciation: [ˈɡɔltbɛk]) is a municipality in the district of Stendal, in Saxony-Anhalt, Germany. In January 2009 it absorbed the former municipality Bertkow.

Goldbeck has a railway station on the Magdeburg-Wittenberge railway, a modern administration building, a church and various shops.

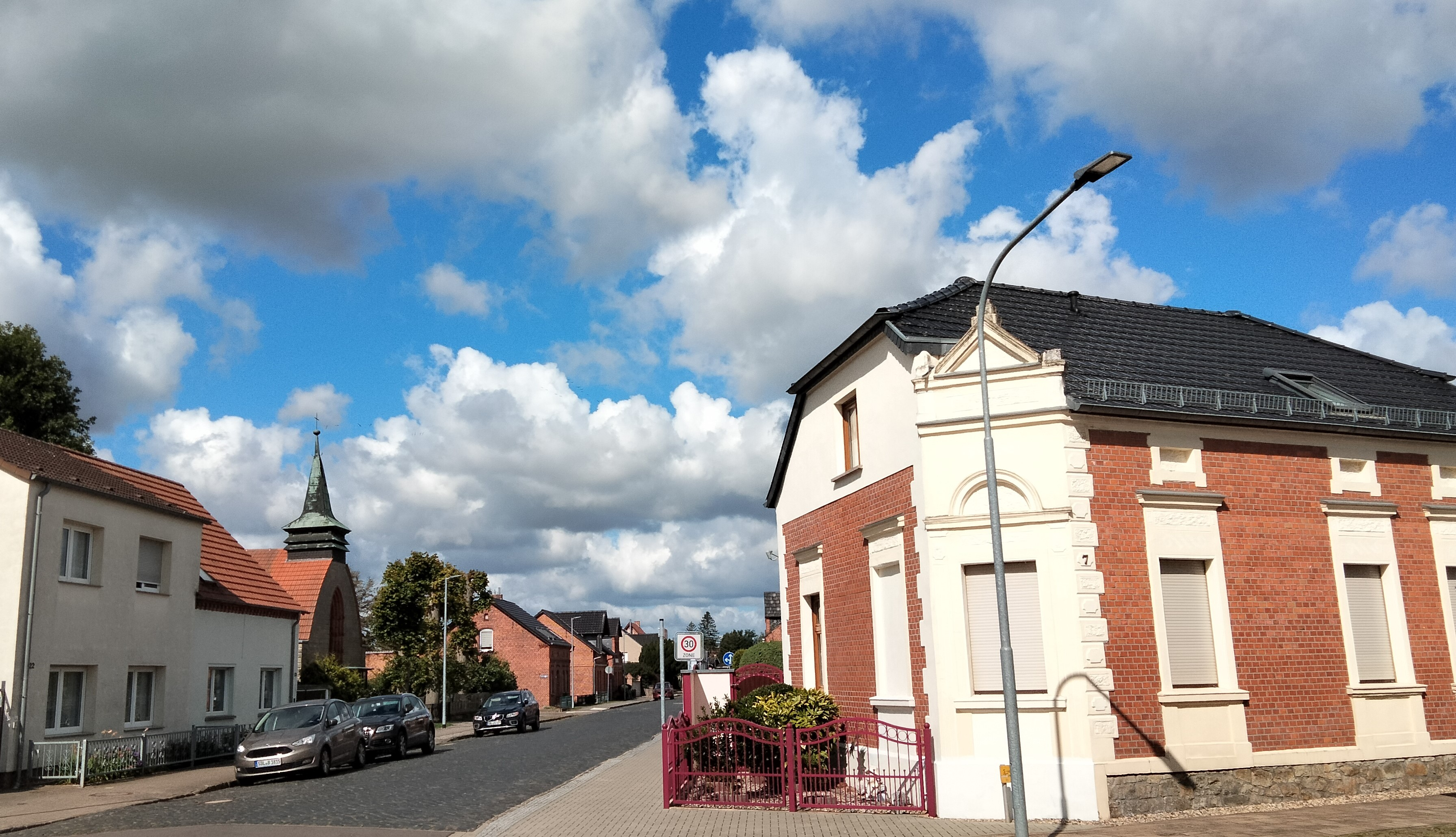
Village centre

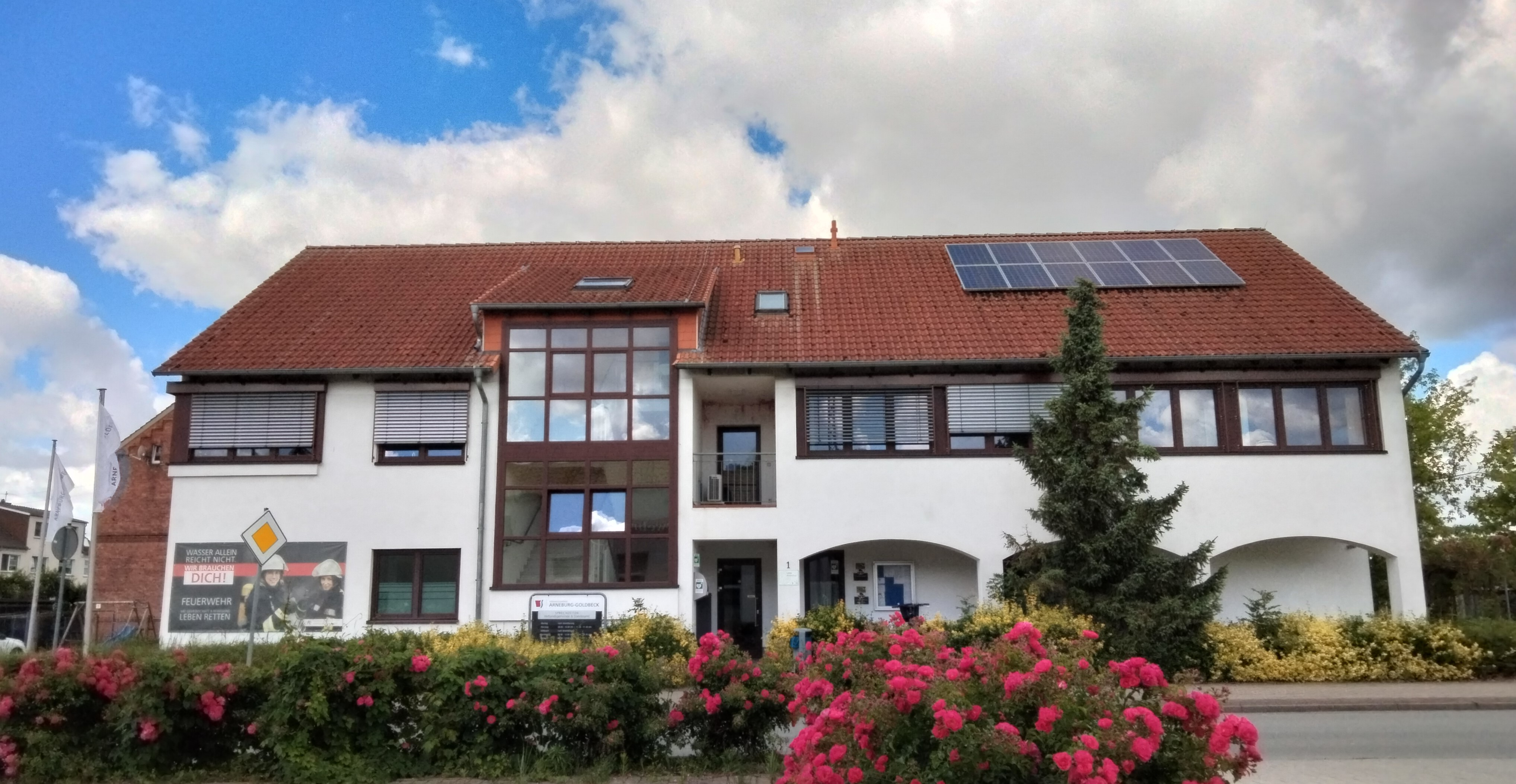
Administration building

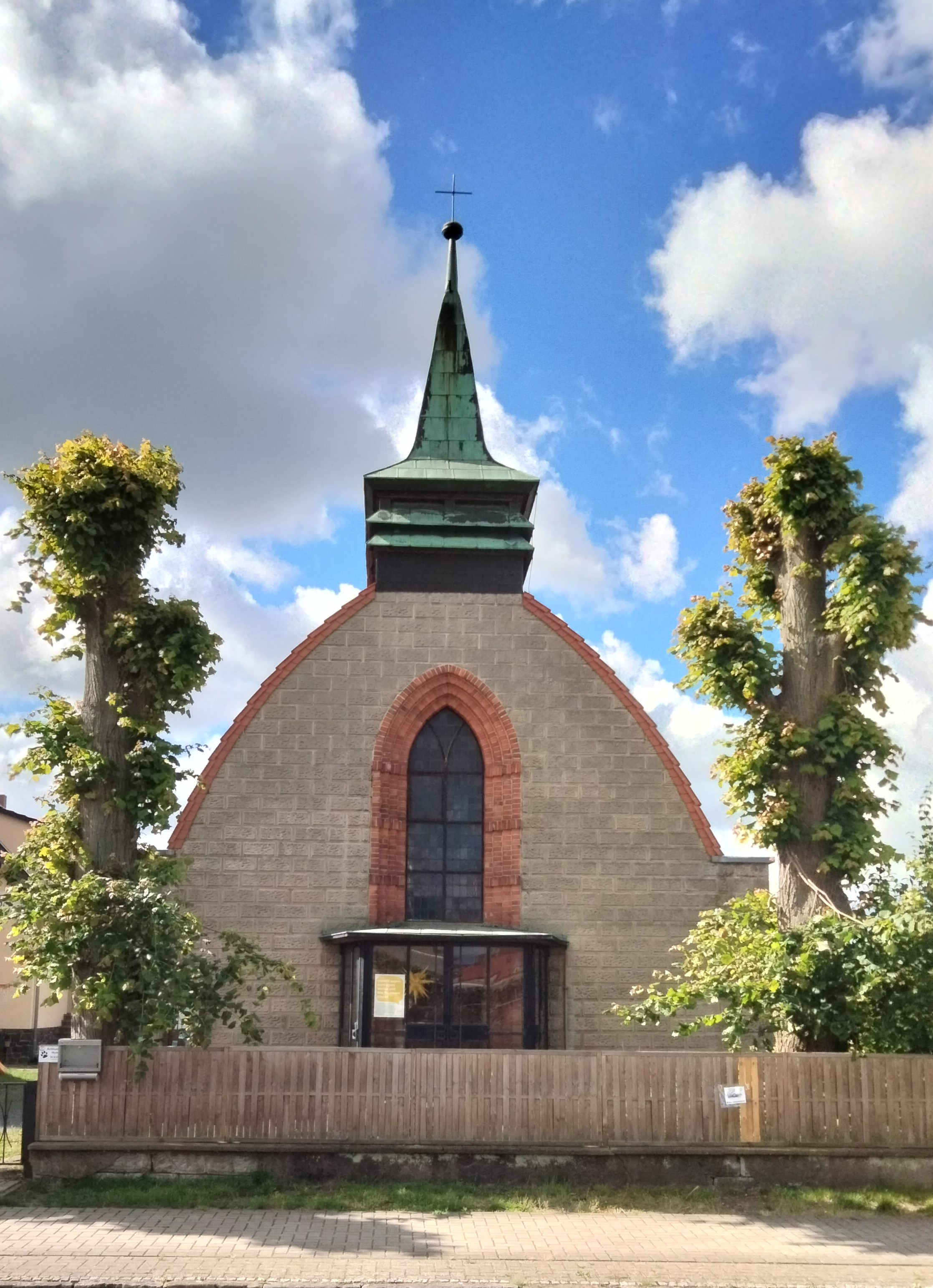
Goldbeck church 2024
