= Battle of Werben =

1631 battle of the Thirty Years' War

Coordinates: 52.8667°N 11.9667°E

- Part of the Thirty Years' War
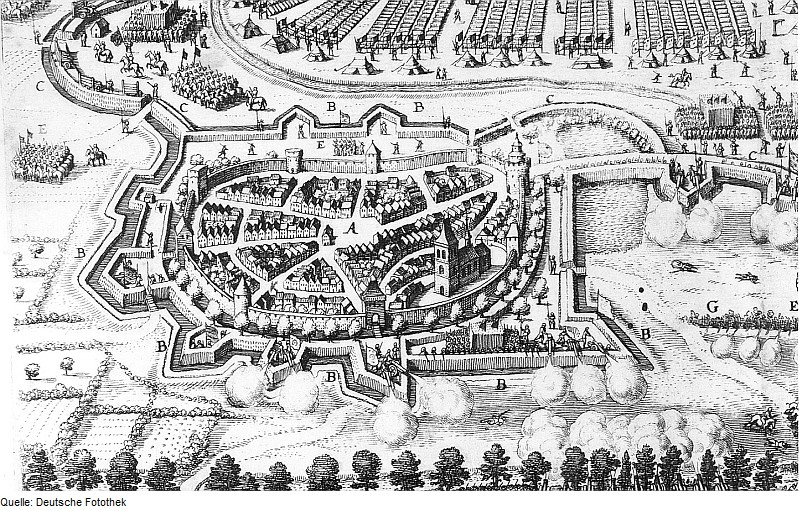
- Illustration of the Battle of Werben (detail)
Date	7 August 1631 (N.S.)
Location	Werben (Elbe), Margraviate of Brandenburg (present-day Saxony-Anhalt)
Result	Swedish victory

Belligerents
(yes) Swedish Empire	Holy Roman Empire: Catholic League

Commanders and leaders
(Swedish Empire) Gustavus Adolphus (Swedish Empire) Wolf von Baudissin	(Holy Roman Empire) Count of Tilly

Strength
15,100	16,200

Casualties and losses
200	>1,000; 6,000 incl. the retreat to Magdeburg

The Battle of Werben took place during the Thirty Years' War on 7 August 1631 (N.S.), between the Swedish Empire and the Holy Roman Empire. The Swedes had 15,100 soldiers and were led by Gustavus Adolphus, while the Imperialists had 16,200 soldiers and were led by Field-Marshal Count Tilly. Tilly's troops attacked Gustavus' entrenchments in front of Werben (Elbe), but Swedish batteries and the cavalry under Wolf Heinrich von Baudissin forced them to retreat, at the cost of 6,000 Imperials and 200 Swedes.

== Bibliography ==
- George Bruce. Harbottle's Dictionary of Battles. (Van Nostrand Reinhold, 1981) (ISBN 0-442-22336-6).
- Clodfelter, M. (2017). Warfare and Armed Conflicts: A Statistical Encyclopedia of Casualty and Other Figures, 1492–2015 (4th ed.). Jefferson, North Carolina: McFarland. ISBN 978-0786474707.
- Wilson, Peter H. (2009). Europe's Tragedy: A History of the Thirty Years War. Allen Lane. ISBN 978-0-7139-9592-3.
