= Werben (Elbe) =

- Town
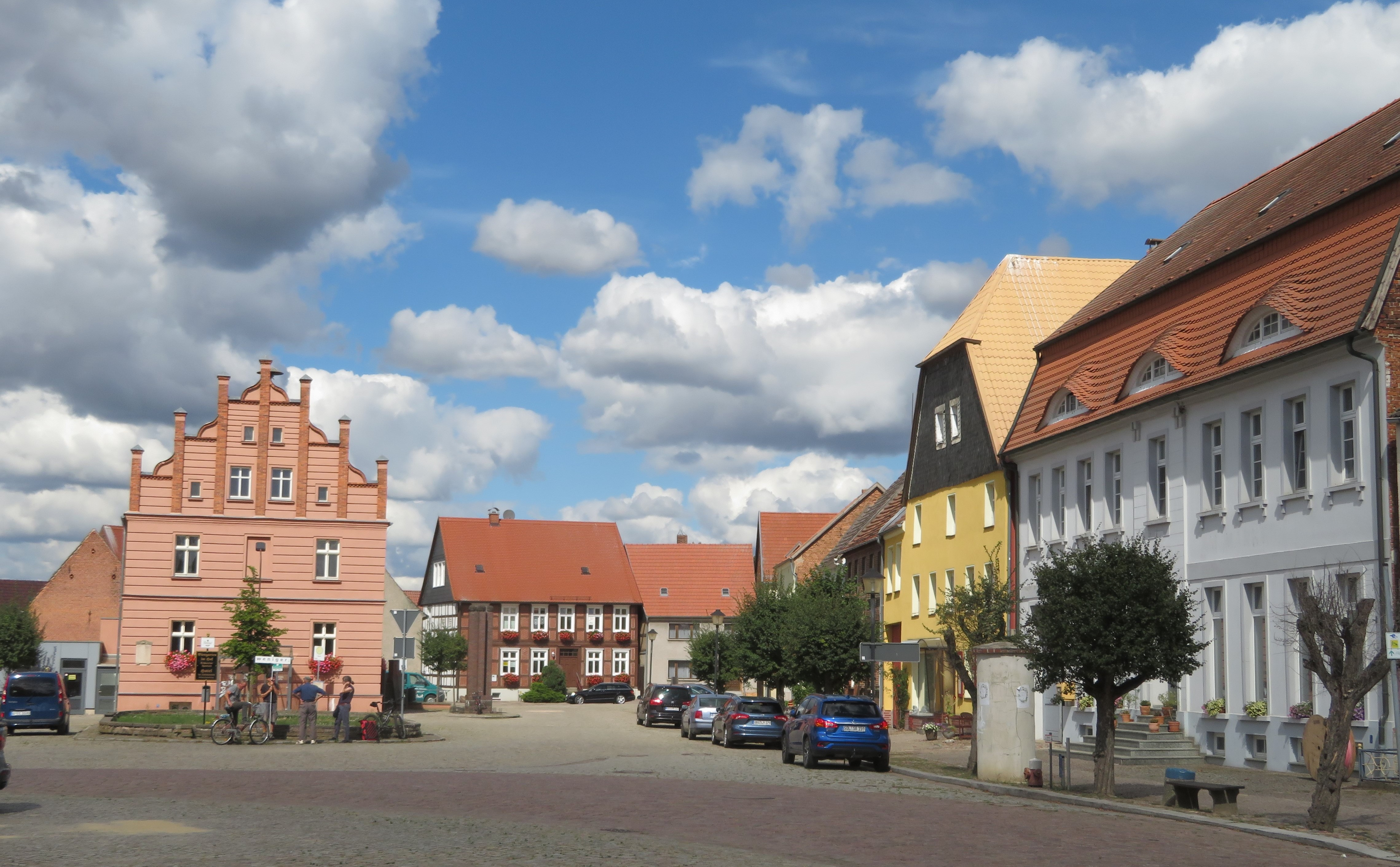
- Market Place and Town Hall of Werben (Elbe)

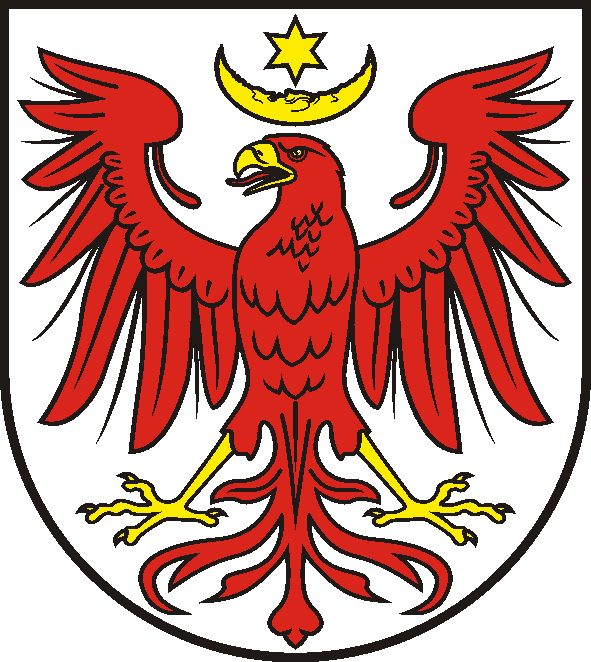
- Coat of arms

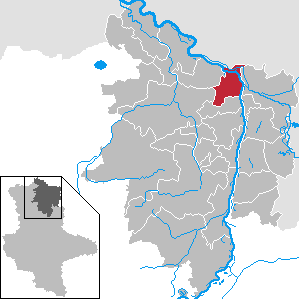
- Location of Werben within Stendal district
- Interactive map of Werben
- Location within Germany Location within Saxony-Anhalt
- Coordinates: 52°52′N 11°58′E
- Country: Germany
- State: Saxony-Anhalt
- District: Stendal
- Municipal assoc.: Arneburg-Goldbeck
- Subdivisions: 2

Government
  - Mayor (2018–25): Bernd Schulze

Area
  - Total: 53.37 km^{2} (20.61 sq mi)
- Elevation: 28 m (92 ft)

Population (2025-12-31)
  - Total: 898
  - Density: 16.8/km^{2} (43.6/sq mi)
- Time zone: UTC+01:00 (CET)
  - Summer (DST): UTC+02:00 (CEST)
- Postal codes: 39615, 39606
- Dialling codes: 039393
- Vehicle registration: SDL
- Website: www.werben-elbe.de

Werben (Elbe) (German pronunciation: [ˈvɛʁbn̩]) is a town in the district of Stendal, in Saxony-Anhalt, Germany.

== Geography ==
It is situated on the left bank of the Elbe River, approximately seven kilometres west of Havelberg. It is part of the Verbandsgemeinde ("collective municipality") Arneburg-Goldbeck. The town's official name is Hansestadt Werben (Elbe), referring to its status as a former member of the Hanseatic League.

== History ==
Werben was first documented in 1005 and placed an influential role during the medieval wars between the Saxons and Polabian Slavs; its name is of Slavic origin. Part of the Altmark, it received town rights in 1151 from Albert the Bear and received an influx of Hollanders in 1160. It became a participant of the Hanseatic League in 1358. While part of the Margraviate of Brandenburg, Werben was the scene of the 1631 Battle of Werben during the Thirty Years' War. Werben became part of the Kingdom of Prussia in 1701. It became part of the Prussian Province of Saxony in 1815 after the Napoleonic Wars and the new state of Saxony-Anhalt after World War II. In January 2010 it absorbed the former municipality Behrendorf.

== Culture ==
Werben's architecture is reminiscent of the Hanseatic League and of Biedermeier style (Biedermeierstadt). Twice a year, the "Biedermeiermarkt" is held, a weekend festival in remembrance of this period.

Several historical buildings in Werben were built of bricks like in Lübeck, the capital of the Hanseatic League. One of the oldest buildings is Saint Lambert's Chapel built in the 13th century which belonged to the Order of Saint John (Bailiwick of Brandenburg) in the Middle Ages. Nowerdays the chapel is just called the "Romanesque House" by many locals. Saint John's Church was built of bricks in a romanesque style the 12th century, transformed into a gothic hall church in the 13th century and renovated in 1868. In the interior, various masterpieces of medieval art can be seen. In the Middle Ages, Werben was surrounded by a wall with five gates and several shot towers. In the eastern part of Werben, Gate Elbtor, the only gate which is preserved and measuring 18.2 metres in height, can be visited. It was built betwewen 1460 and 1470 and renovated in 1998. In the southern part of Werben, a part of the medieval wall with a shot tower called "Hungerturm" can be visited. Another historical building built of bricks is Heilig-Geist-Kapelle, a gothic chapel dating from 1313 which was transformed into a salt store in the 15th century. Thus it got the nickname "Salzkirche (Salt Church)". Several well-preserved half-timbered houses are to be found in the town centre. One of them is a former school ("Alte Schule") which was built in the 18th century and renovated in 2017. The Old Pharmacy ("Alte Apotheke") dates from 1720.

The Townhall in the Market Place was built in 1792 in a neoclassicist style.

== Personalities ==
=== Sons and daughters of the city ===
- Friedrich Reindel (1824-1908), Scharfrichter

=== People who are connected to the city ===
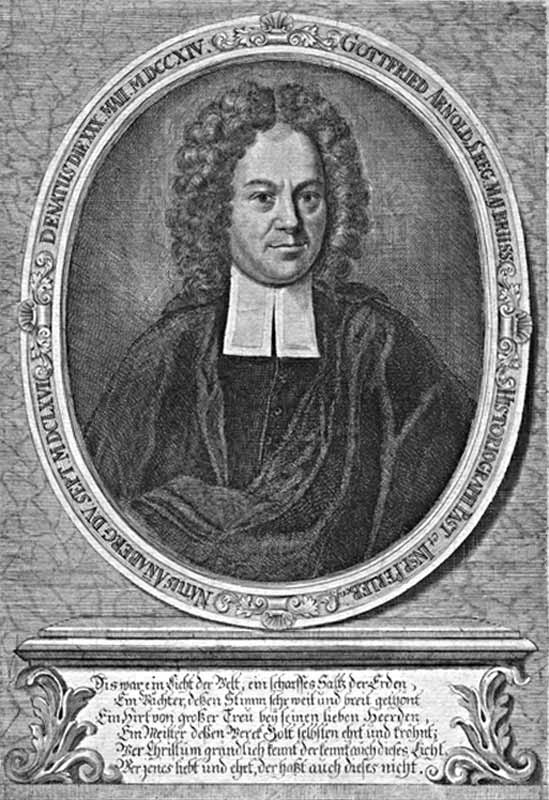
Gottfried-Arnold

- Markgraf Albrecht the Bear (c. 1100-1170), issued the first charter as a margrave of Brandenburg in Werder in 1157, and donated the income of the Werbener Kirche and Grundbesitz to the Johanniterhospital at Jerusalem in 1160.
- Gottfried Arnold (Germanic theologian, 1666-1714) was pastor from 1704 to 1707 in advertisements
- Friedrich Schorlemmer (born 1944), evangelical theologian, grew up in advertising and lives in Werben (as of 2012)
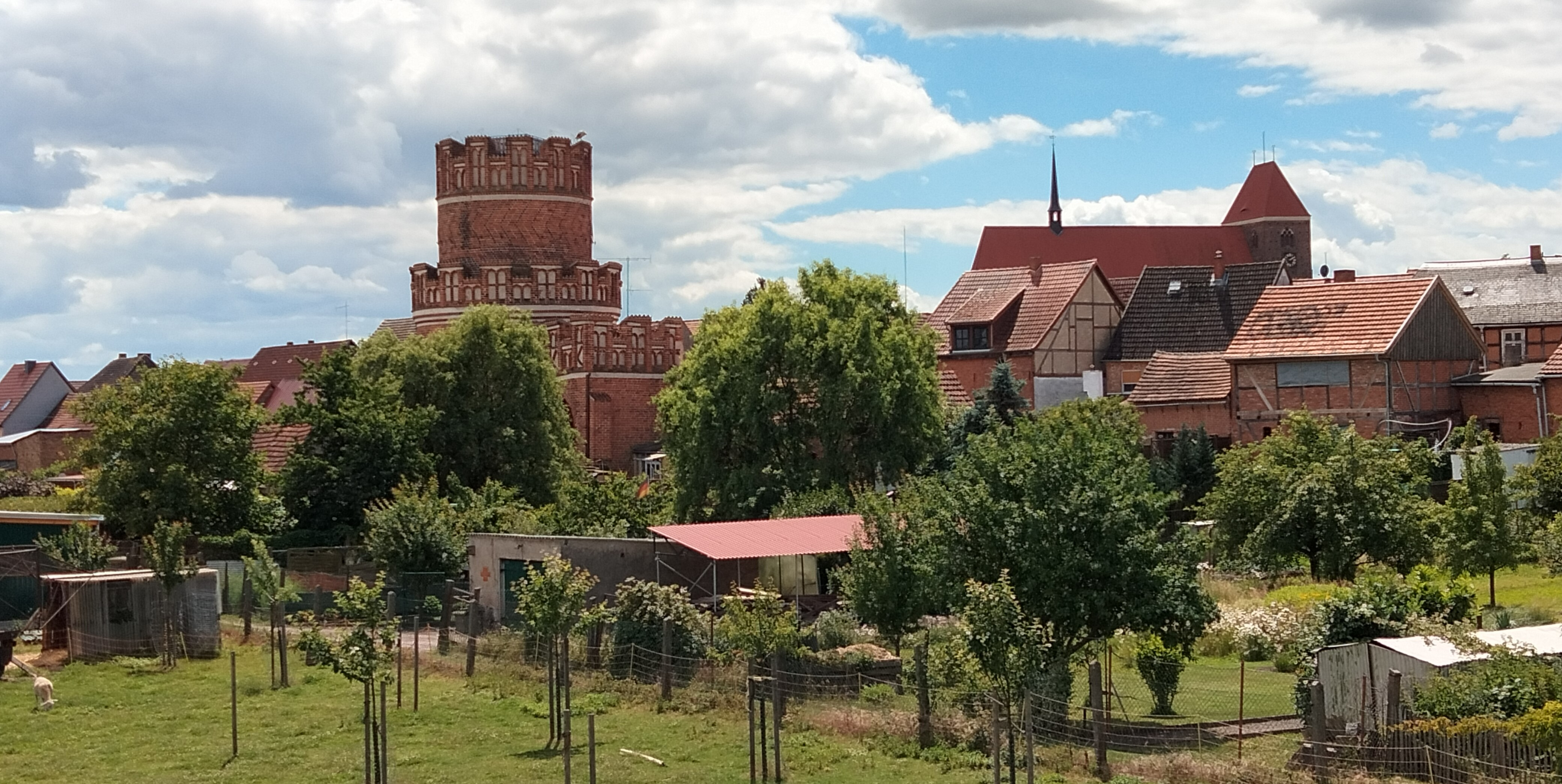
General view of the town centre

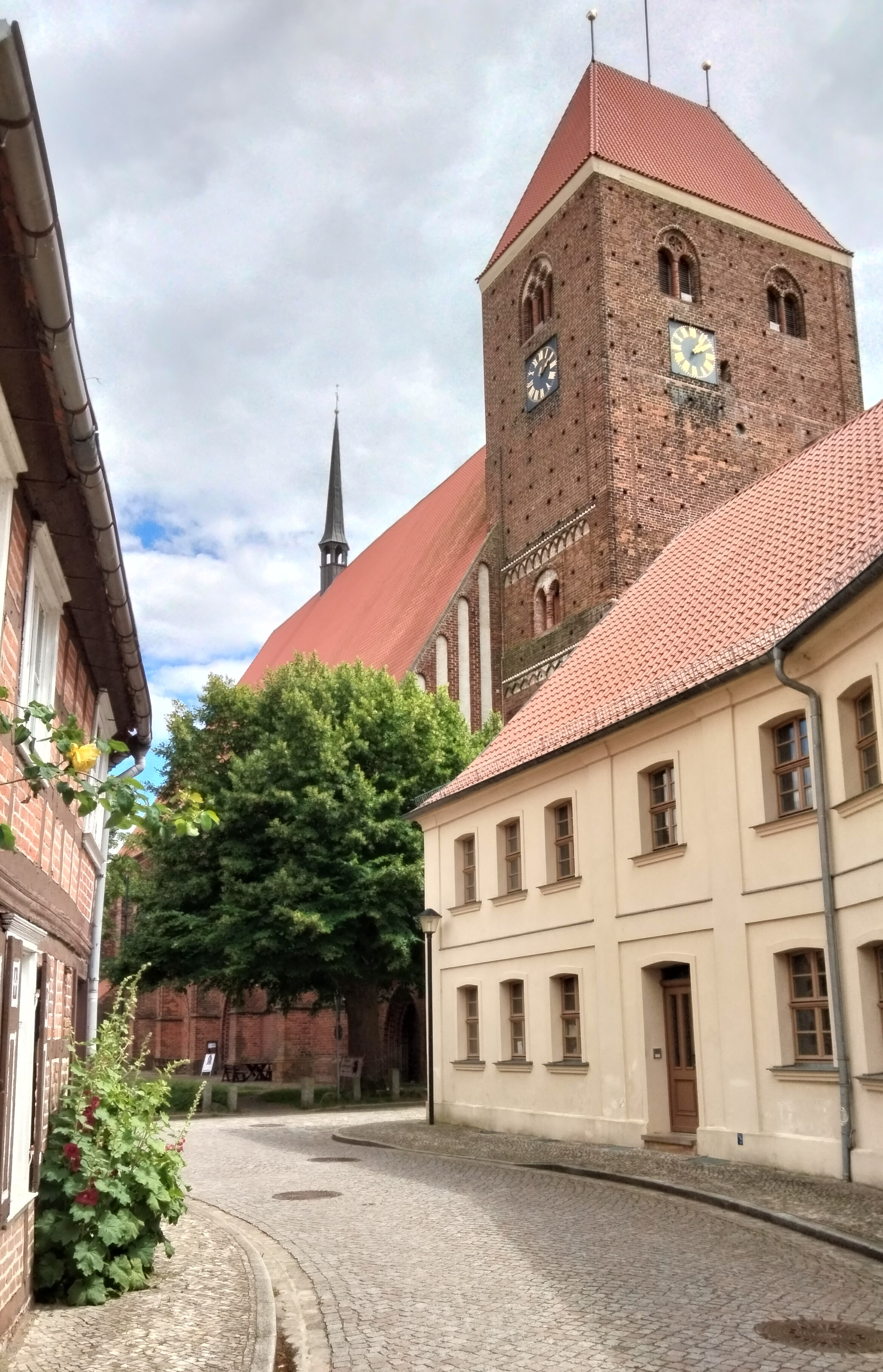
St. John's Church

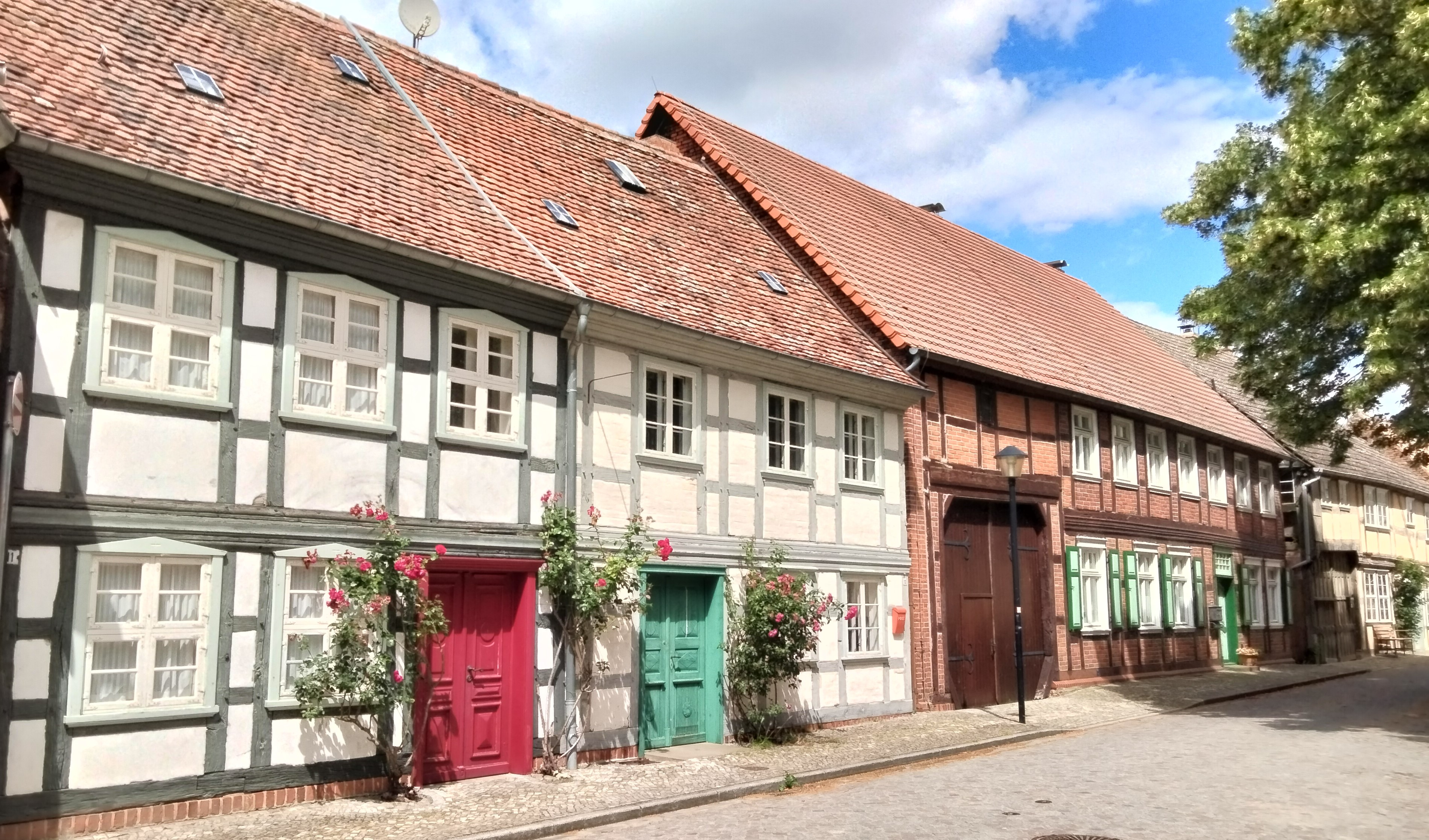
Half-timbered houses opposite the church

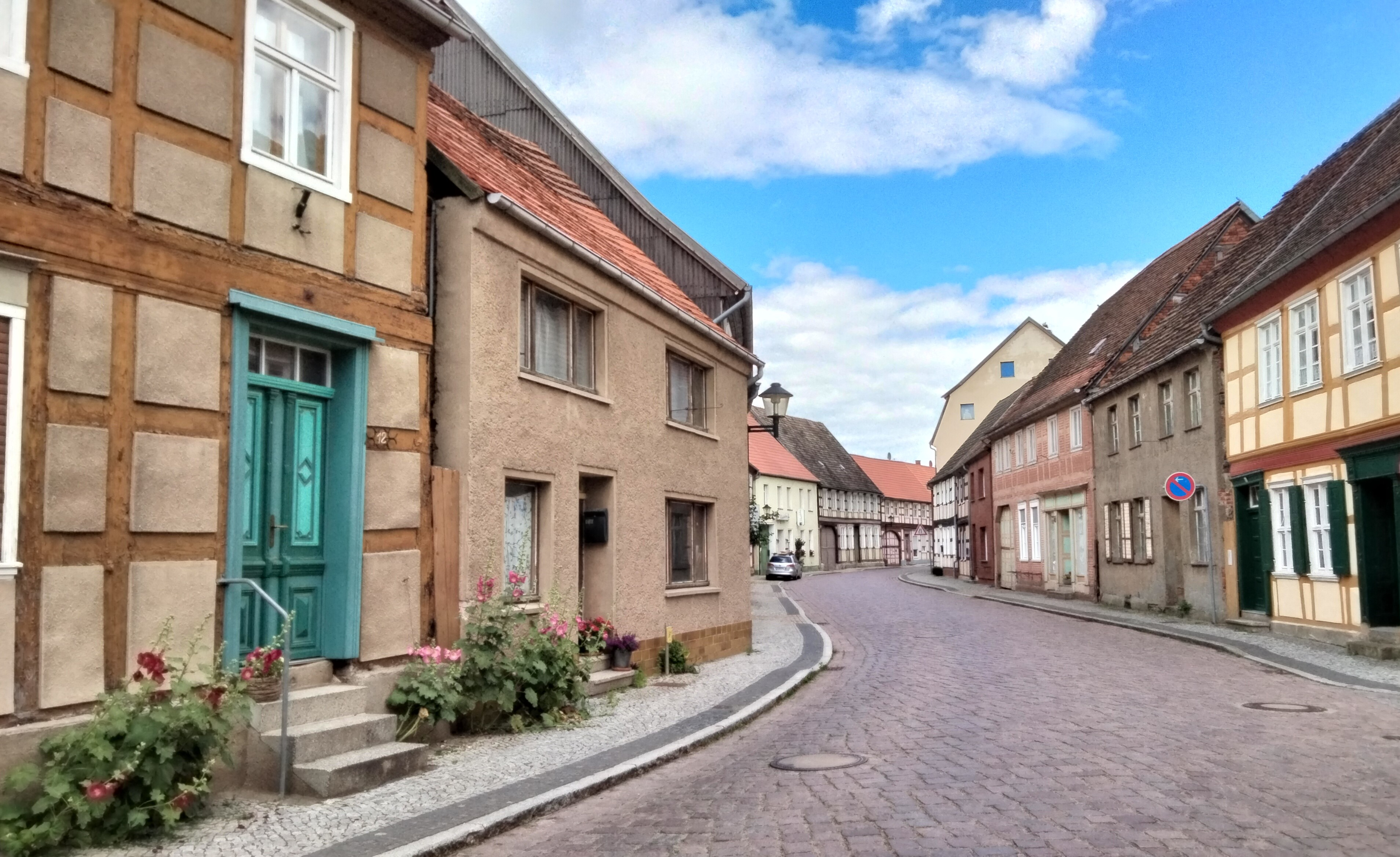
Half-timbered houses in Seehäuser Strasse

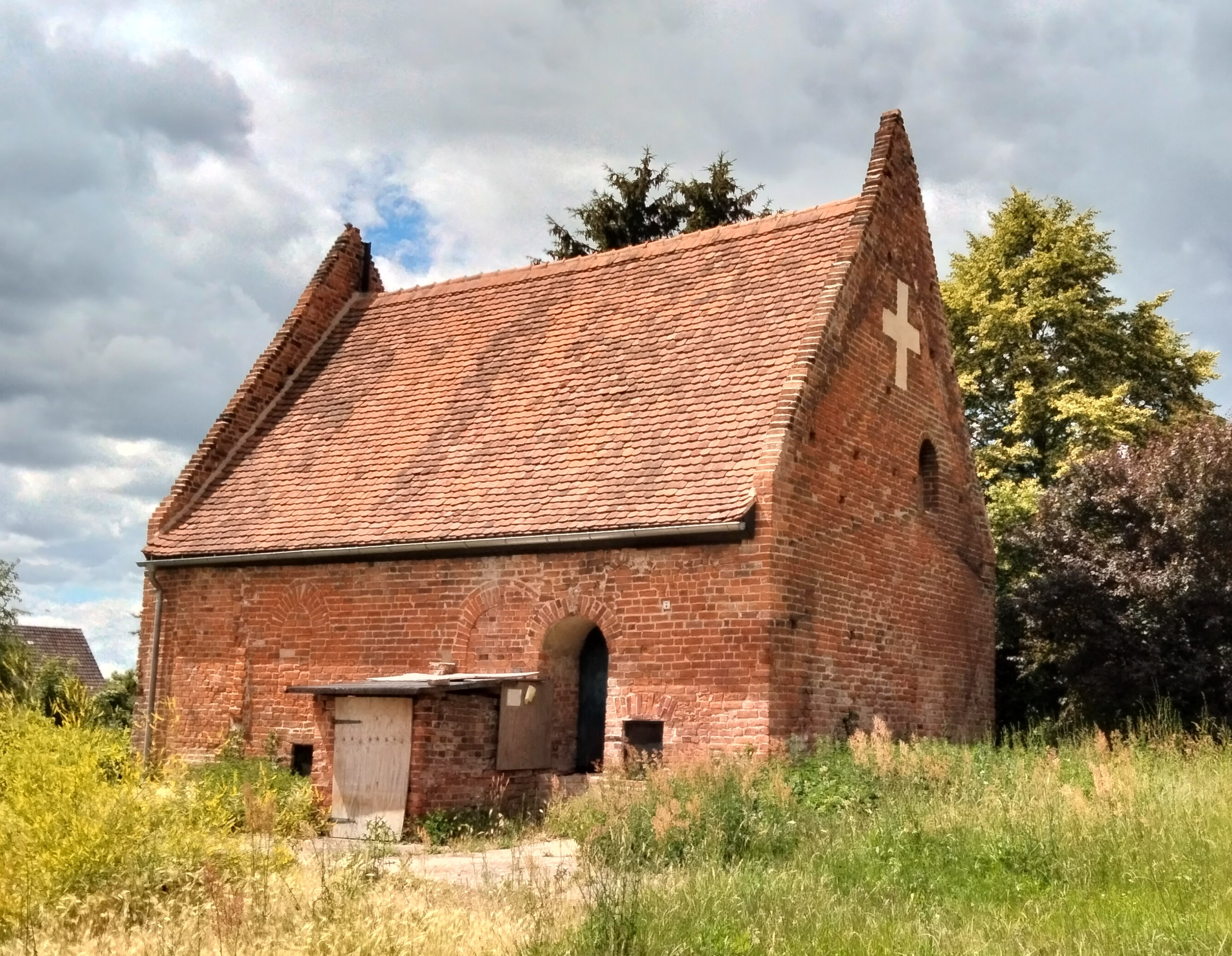
Romanesque House

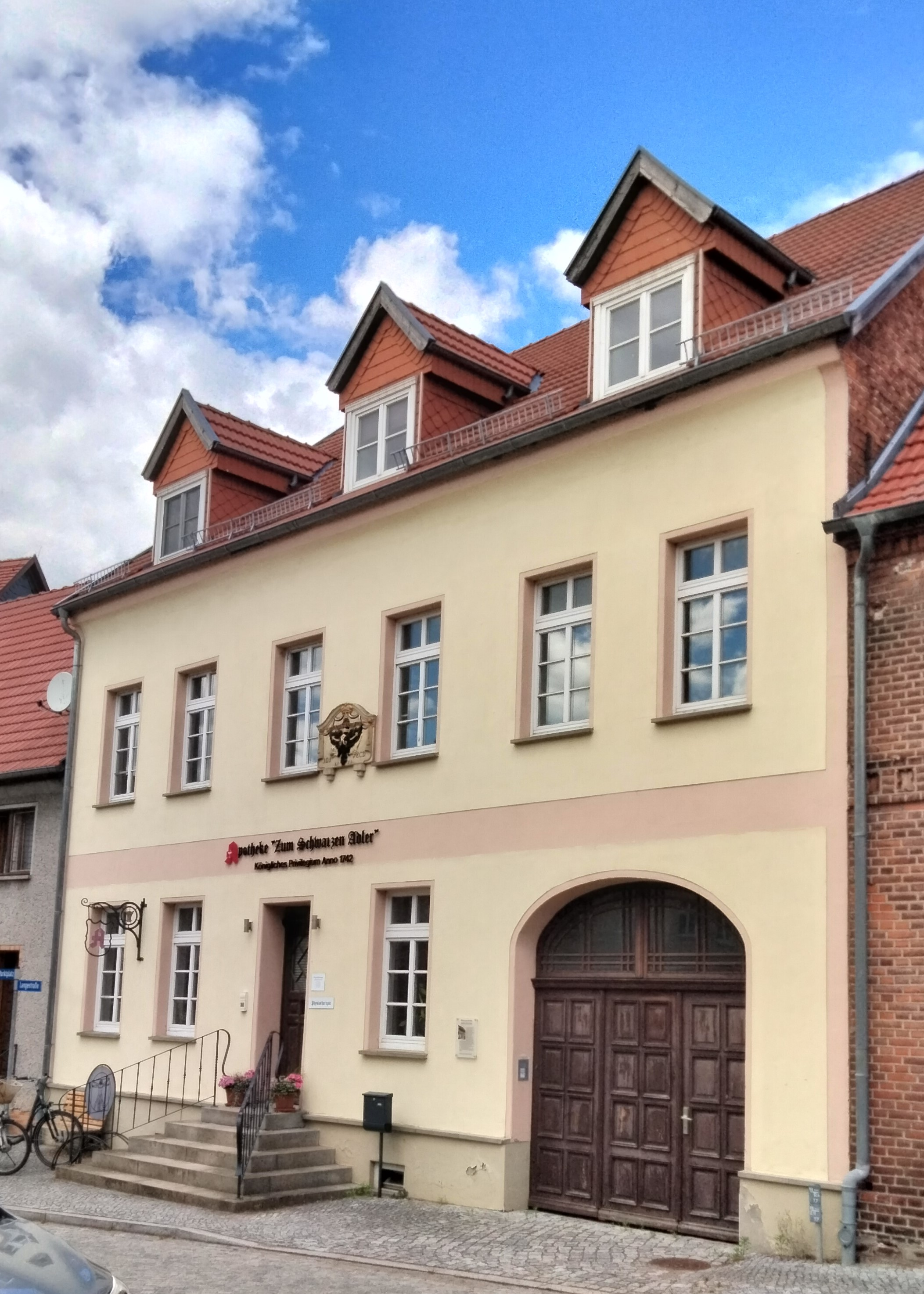
Old pharmacy

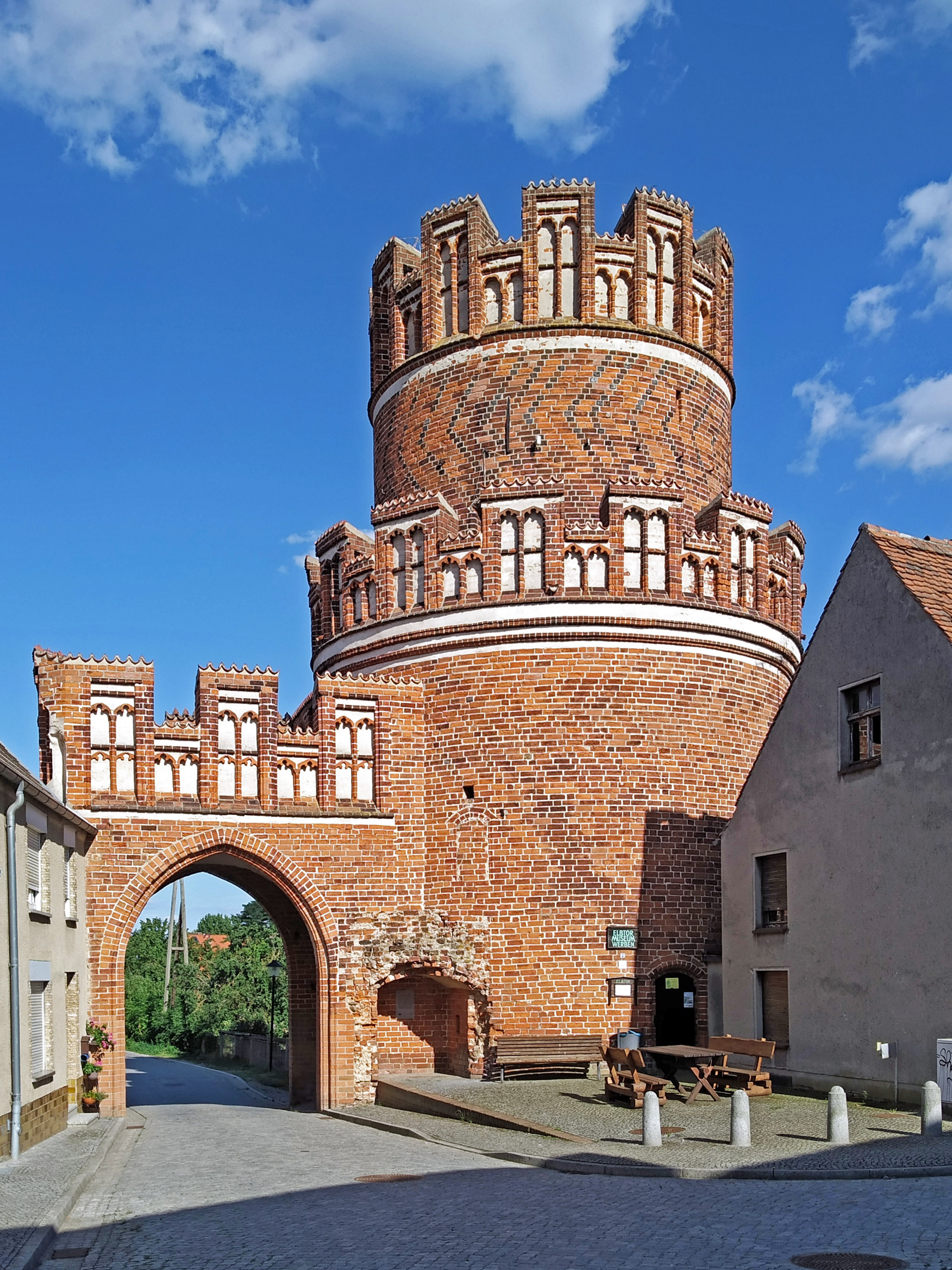
Gate Elbtor

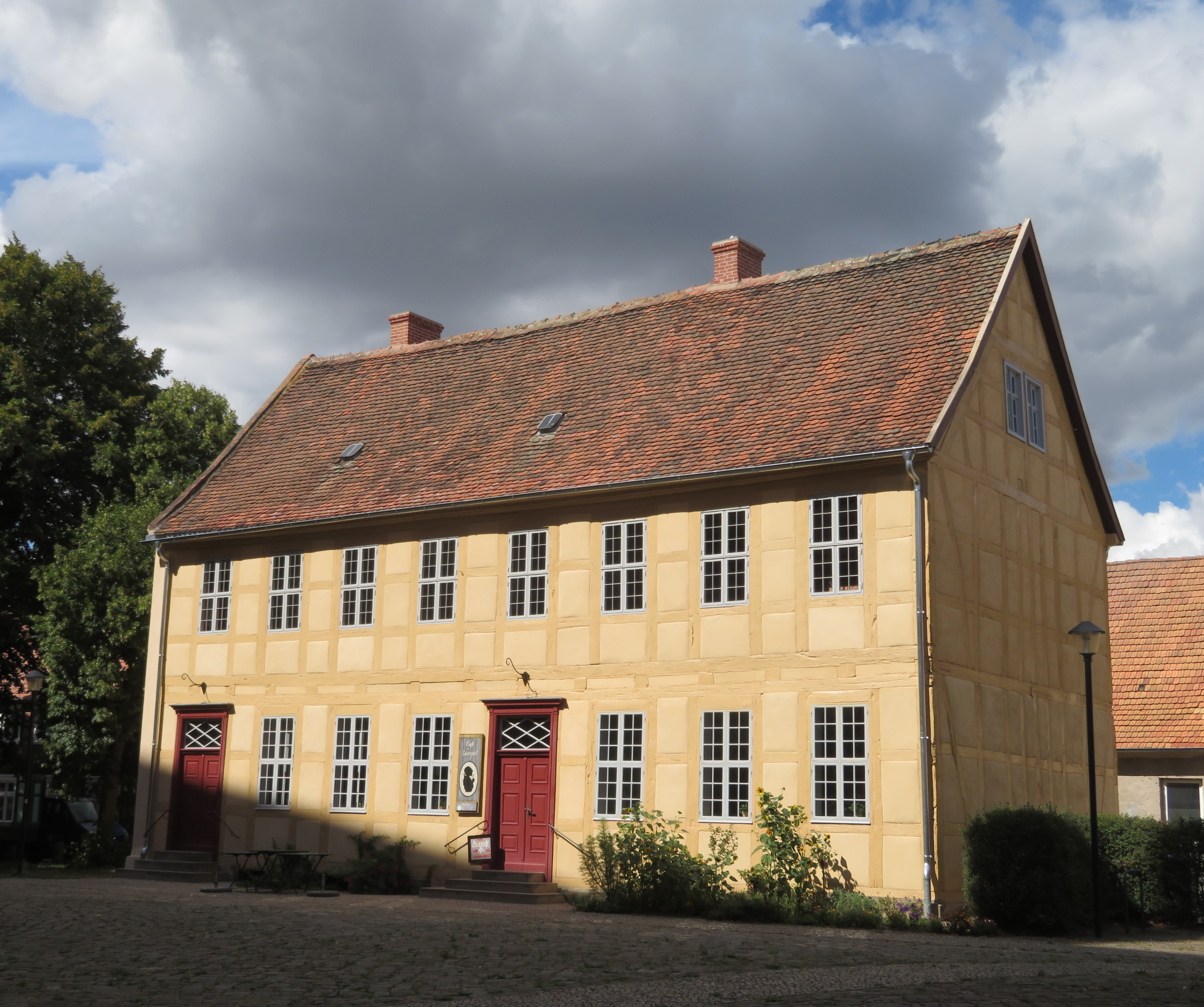
Former school

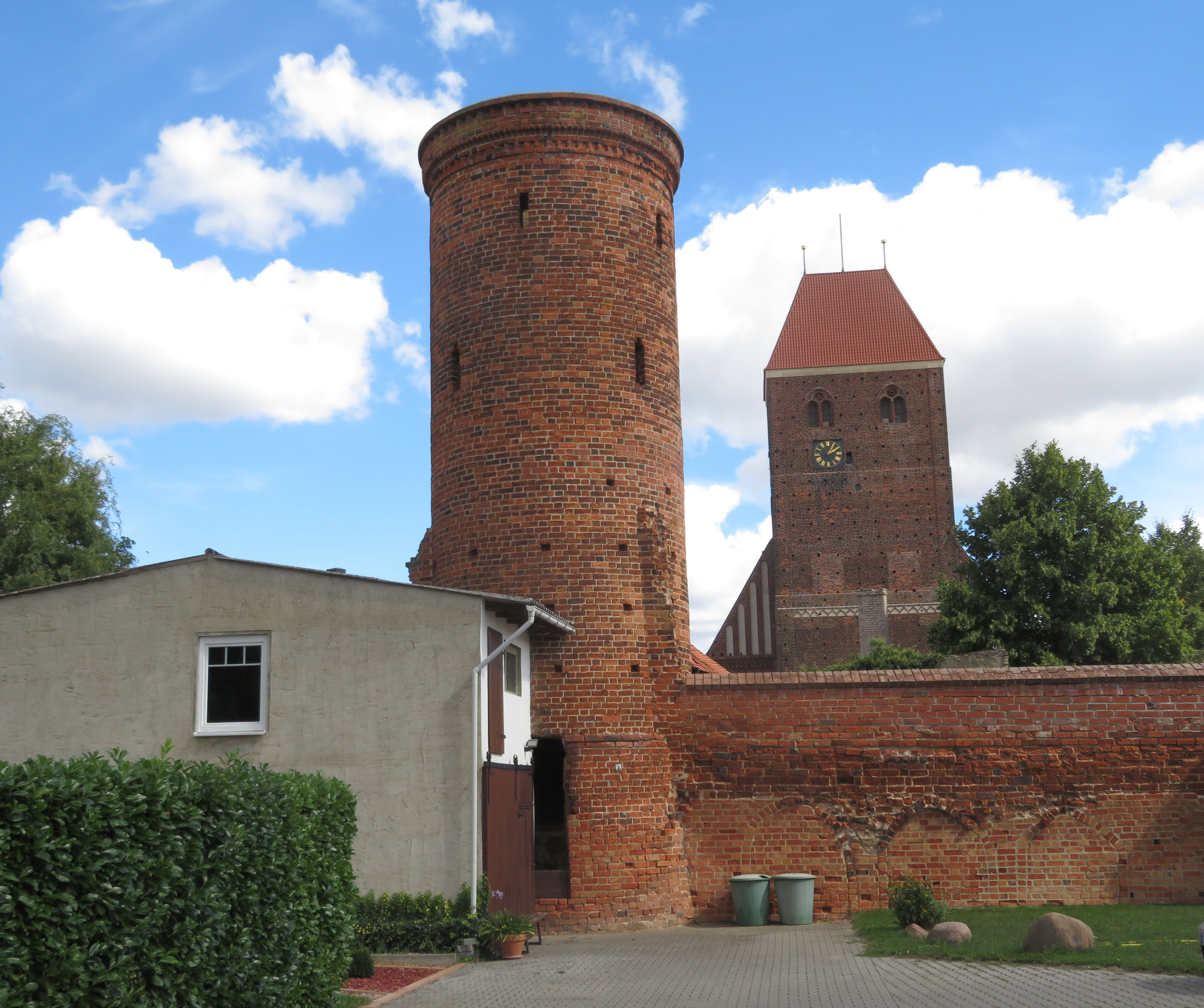
Medieval wall with shot tower
