= Beelitz, Saxony-Anhalt =

Beelitz
- Stadtteil of Arneburg
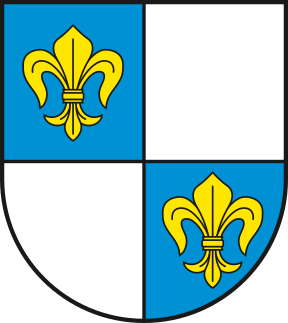
- Coat of arms
- Interactive map of Beelitz
- Location within Germany Location within Saxony-Anhalt
- Coordinates: 52°41′N 11°57′E
- Country: Germany
- State: Saxony-Anhalt
- District: Stendal
- Town: Arneburg

Area
  - Total: 4.27 km^{2} (1.65 sq mi)
- Elevation: 31 m (102 ft)

Population (2009-12-31)
  - Total: 69
  - Density: 16/km^{2} (42/sq mi)
- Time zone: UTC+01:00 (CET)
  - Summer (DST): UTC+02:00 (CEST)
- Postal codes: 39596
- Dialling codes: 039321

Beelitz is a village and a former municipality in the district of Stendal, in Saxony-Anhalt, Germany. Since 1 July 2009, it is part of the town Arneburg.
