= Wolf Heinrich von Baudissin =

German general (1579–1646)

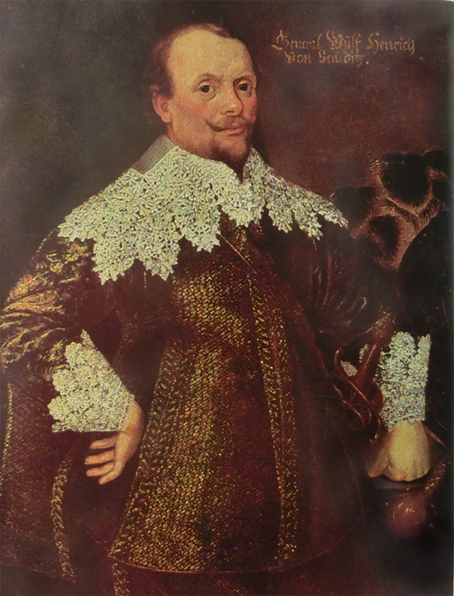
Baudissin

Wolf Heinrich von Baudissin or Bauditz (1579–1646) was a Protestant German cavalry commander who rose to the rank of field marshal during the Thirty Years' War.

== Early life ==
He was born as the son of Christoph von Baudissin (d. 1617) and his wife, Anna von Taubadel (d. 1598). By birth, he was a member of the House of Baudissin, an old Saxon noble family of Sorbian origin.

== Biography ==
Born in Luppa, Upper Lusatia, Baudissin entered Danish service when he was 28, being promoted to Oberst in 1625. He fought under Ernst von Mansfeld and led his troops after the death of Mansfeld in 1626. After the Treaty of Lübeck Baudissin entered the service of King Gustavus Adolphus of Sweden as a colonel of horse, fighting in the Polish campaign of 1627–29, where he was captured by the Poles and later exchanged.

With his cavalry regiment he accompanied Gustavus Adolphus to Germany in 1630, and led a contingent of Swedish forces at Werben in 1631, in Westphalia, and near Cologne. He captured Bingen, besieged Spanish troops at Drachenfels Castle, and sacked the town of Andernach in 1633, rising to general-leutnant of cavalry in Swedish service. After disagreements with various Swedish commanders he left Swedish employ and entered the service of the Electorate of Saxony as a Generalfeldmarschall and was defeated by the Swedes at Dömitz.

Baudissin was severely wounded during a siege of Magdeburg in 1636 and forced to retire. He subsequently became a Saxon diplomat to Denmark and Poland. Through both his marriages, his family became part of the German nobility of Holstein. He died in Luppa.

== Marriages and issue ==
In 1625 Baudissin married firstly Anna Sophia von Kißleben (d. 1629), daughter of Burchard von Kißleben and his wife, Maria von Thal. They had two sons:

- Christian Anton von Baudissin (1625-1709)
- Gustav Adolf von Baudissin (1629-1695); married Maria Cotton of Middlesex, England; no issue

On 5 August 1633 he married secondly to Sophie von Rantzau (1620-1697), daughter of Gert von Rantzau-Breitenburg (1558-1627) and his wife, Dorothea von Brockdorff (1596-1630). Together they had:

- Count Heinrich Günther von Baudissin (1636-1673); married Sara Margrethe von Günderrode (1642-1723) and had issue
- Wolfgang Ehrenreich von Baudissin (b. 1638)
- Christina Elisabeth von von Baudissin (b. 1642)
- Vladislav Gerhard von Baudissin (1644-1665)
- Anna Dorothea von Baudissin (1634-1690); married to Heinrich von Ahlefeldt (b. 1624)
- Polyxena von Baudissin
- Sophie Elisabeth von Baudissin
- Christian von Baudissin (d. 1709)
