= Arneburg =

- Town
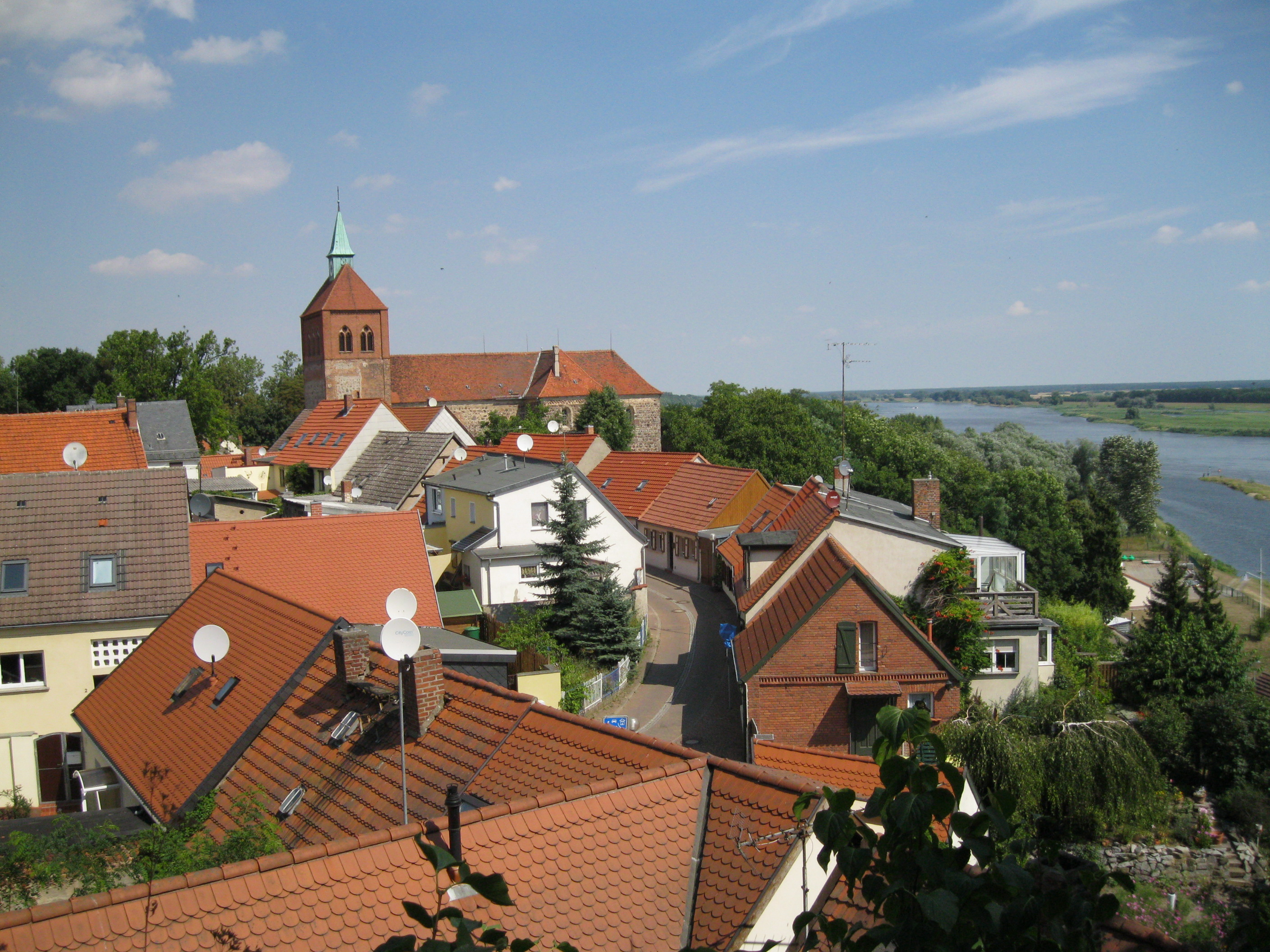
- Arneburg

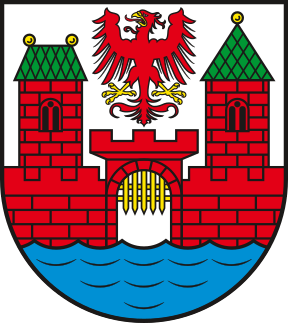
- Coat of arms

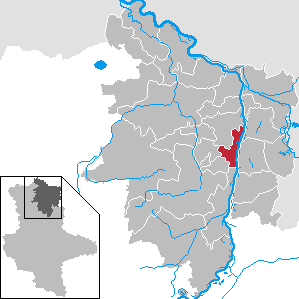
- Location of Arneburg within Stendal district
- Interactive map of Arneburg
- Location within Germany Location within Saxony-Anhalt
- Coordinates: 52°40′N 12°0′E
- Country: Germany
- State: Saxony-Anhalt
- District: Stendal
- Municipal assoc.: Arneburg-Goldbeck

Government
  - Mayor (2022–29): Lothar Riedinger (CDU)

Area
  - Total: 30.64 km^{2} (11.83 sq mi)
- Elevation: 29 m (95 ft)

Population (2025-12-31)
  - Total: 1,379
  - Density: 45.01/km^{2} (116.6/sq mi)
- Time zone: UTC+01:00 (CET)
  - Summer (DST): UTC+02:00 (CEST)
- Postal codes: 39596
- Dialling codes: 039321
- Vehicle registration: SDL
- Website: www.arneburg-goldbeck.de

Arneburg (German: [ˈaʁnəbʊʁk]) is a town in the district of Stendal, in Saxony-Anhalt, Germany. It is situated on the left bank of the Elbe, approx. 12 kilometres (7.5 mi) northeast of Stendal. It is part of the Verbandsgemeinde ("collective municipality") of Arneburg-Goldbeck. In July 2009, it absorbed the former municipality Beelitz.

== History ==
The stronghold was founded by Henry the Fowler on the Elbe as a bulwark against the Wends. In the Middle Ages, Arneburg was a strategic possession of Brandenburg, whose Elector Frederick II (the "Iron Elector") mortgaged it for "100 good Rhenish gilders" to Hans von Blumenthal, who was appointed Vogt of Arneburg, a post which he still held long after 1450, when the Hohenzollerns had repaid the mortgage. Arneburg was an important Hohenzollern possession and, indeed, the Elector John Cicero died there in 1499. The ruins are now part of a park surrounded by the town.
