= Heinrich Holk =

Danish-German mercenary (1599–1633)

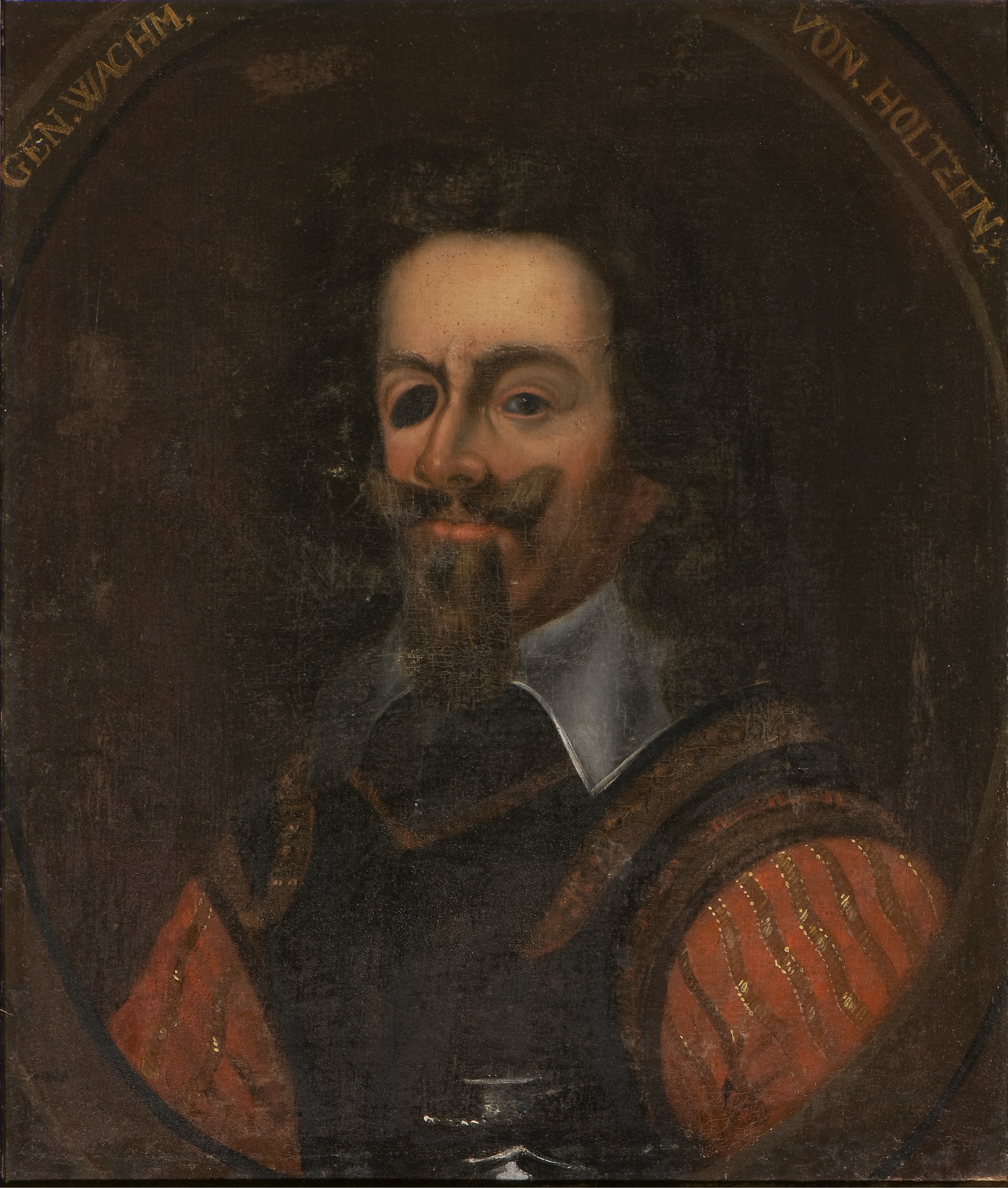
A picture of Holk

Holk's signature

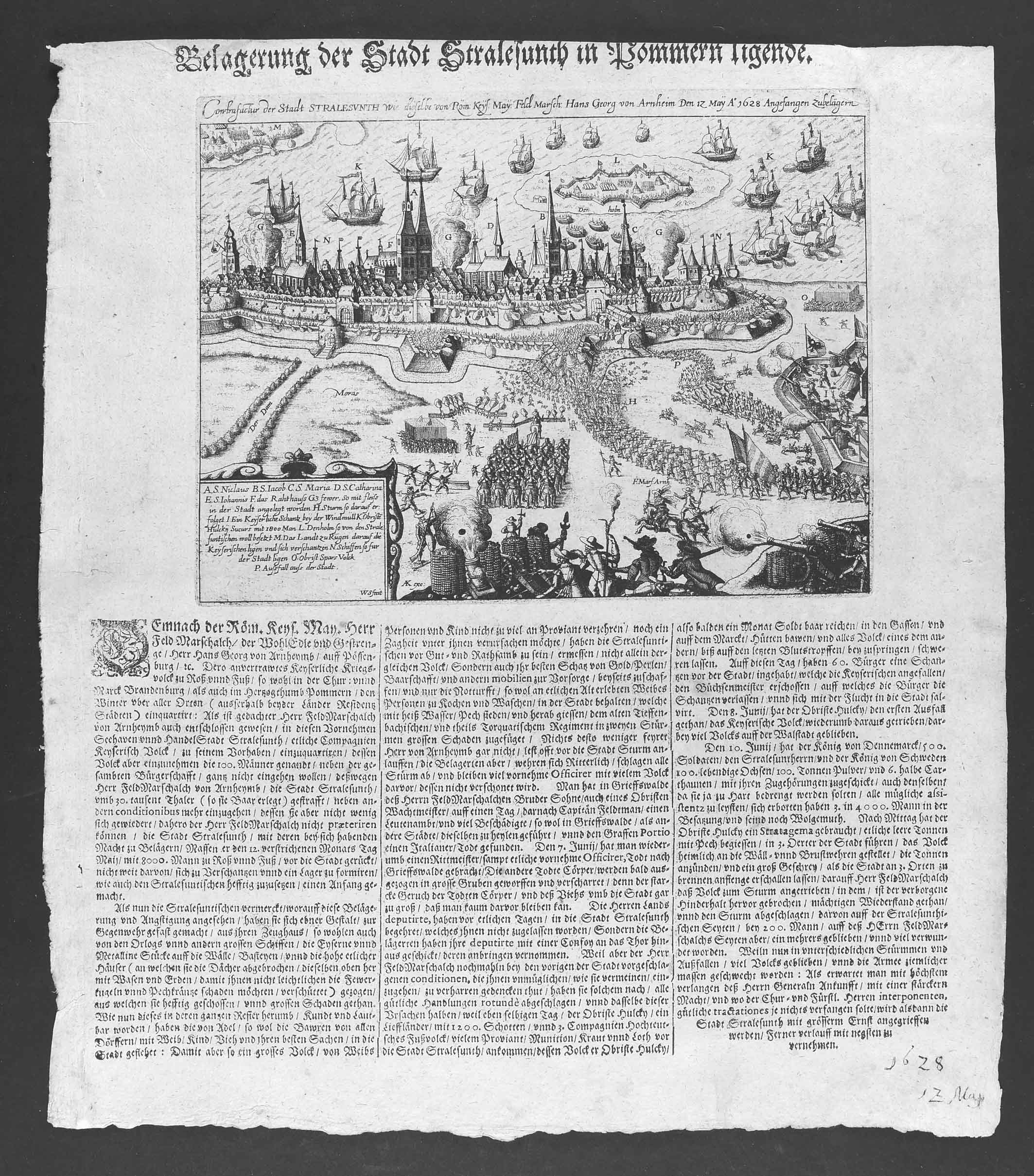
Contemporary leaflet describing the Battle of Stralsund (1628). Holk is mentioned as "Obrist Holky".

Heinrich Holk (also Holke or Henrik Holck; 18 April 1599 – 9 September 1633) was a Danish-German mercenary in both Christian IV of Denmark's and Albrecht von Wallenstein's service during the Thirty Years' War.

Holk was born in Kronborg castle, Denmark. Serving Christian IV, he was commander of the Danish-Scottish force in the Battle of Stralsund in 1628, defending the besieged town of Stralsund against Wallenstein's imperial army. When Christian was forced into a peace with Wallenstein in 1629, Holk entered the latter's service. In 1632, he was given a cavalry command. His unit, referred to as "Holk's Horse", was known for their fierce attitude not only in battle, but also in pillage and rape - "notorious even in an age of atrocities". He took part in the devastation and looting of the Electorate of Saxony, and faced Gustavus Adolphus of Sweden's cavalry in the Battle of Lützen. The battle marked the end of his active career, though he remained in office as a senior commander. The following year, he died of plague in Kronborg castle, Denmark while negotiating a truce after a two-week battle near Saxony.

Holk retired after two weeks and, on Wallenstein's orders, renewed talks with Arnim who was then visiting Johann Georg. The two generals met for dinner when Holk suddenly fell ill. Fearing poison, he was assured otherwise and left in his coach to confer with his subordinates. By now it was obvious he had the plague and they refused to see him. He died by the road side alone, his coachman having gone to fetch a priest.

== Bibliography ==
- Keegan, John; Wheatcroft, Andrew (1996). Who's who in military history: From 1453 to the present day (2 ed.). Routledge. ISBN 0-415-12722-X.
- Mackillop, Andrew; Murdoch, Steve (2003). Military governors and imperial frontiers c. 1600-1800: A study of Scotland and empires. BRILL. ISBN 90-04-12970-7.
- Jens E, Olesen (2003). "Christian IV og dansk Pommernpolitik". In Asmus, Ivo; Droste, Heiko; Olesen, Jens E. (eds.). Gemeinsame Bekannte: Schweden und Deutschland in der Frühen Neuzeit (in Danish). Berlin-Hamburg-Münster: LIT Verlag. ISBN 3-8258-7150-9.
- Wilson, Peter (2009). The Thirty Years War: Europe's Tragedy. London: Penguin Group. p. 529. ISBN 978-0-674-03634-5.
