= Osterwalde =

Osterwalde is a medieval shire (Gau) in the Eastphalia region of the Duchy of Saxony. In present-day terms, it is located in northern Saxony-Anhalt. It was bordered by the River Ohre to the west and by the River Dumme to the north; its eastern borders are unclear; it possibly reached all the way to the River Elbe. The most important town was Salzwedel, other towns were Seebenau, Tylsen, and Osterwohle, after which it is probably named. Neighboring shires include Drevani, Chojna, Balsamgau, Nordthüringgau, Derlingau, and Bardengau.

By the 12th century, the Gau Osterwalde had become a part of the Margraviate of Brandenburg. Together with the Balsamgau, it formed the westernmost part of Brandenburg, which later came to be known as the Altmark.
