= Eastphalia =

Historical region in northern Germany

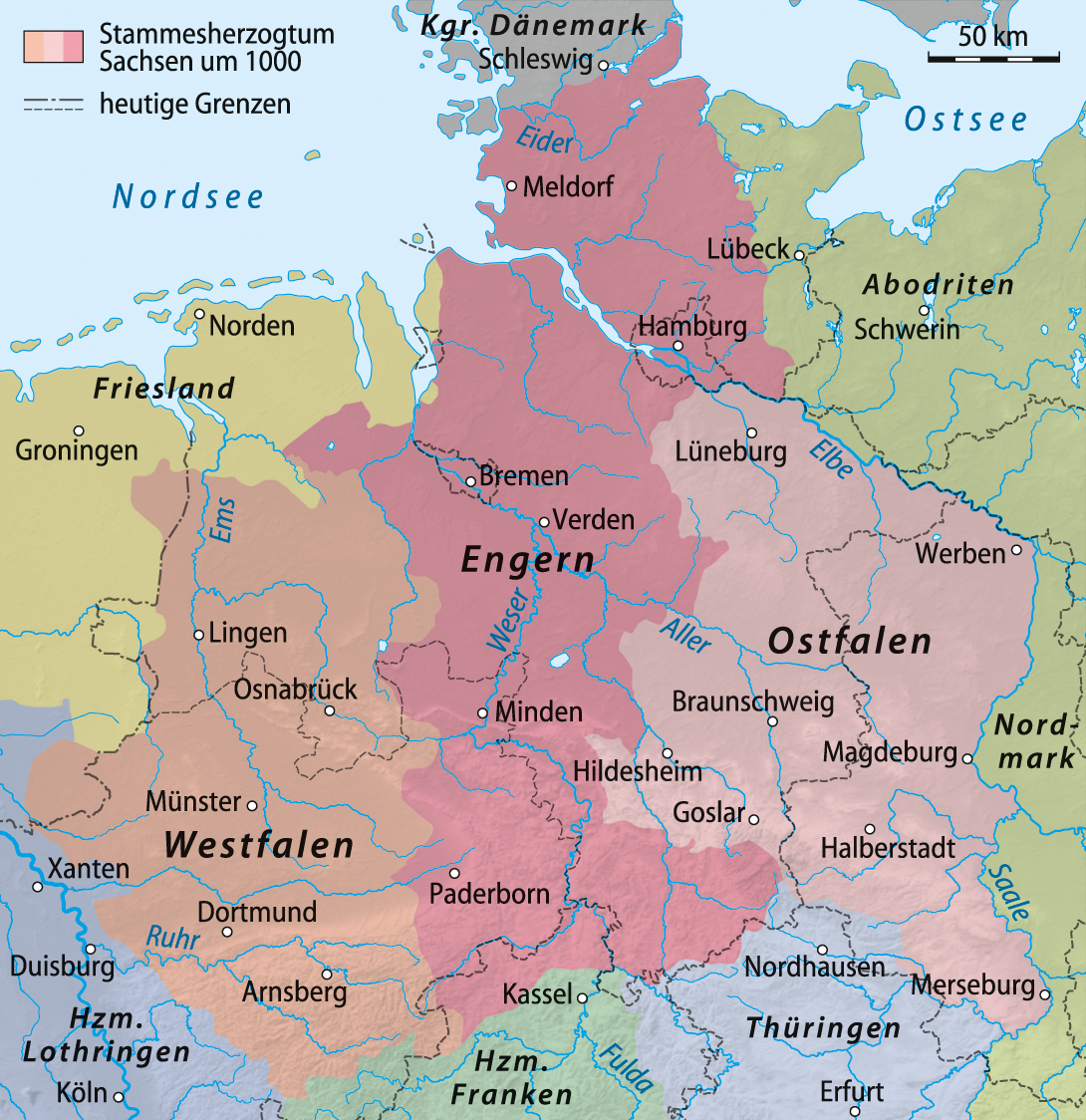
Eastphalia (German: Ostfalen) within Saxony circa 1000 CE

Eastphalia (German: Ostfalen [ɔstˈfaːlən]; Eastphalian: Oostfalen) is a historical region in northern Germany, encompassing the eastern Gaue (shires) of the historic stem duchy of Saxony, roughly confined by the River Leine in the west and the Elbe and Saale in the east. The territory corresponds with modern southeastern Lower Saxony, western Saxony-Anhalt, and northern Thuringia. Together with Westphalia, Angria, and Nordalbingia, it was one of the four main Saxon administrative regions.

== Etymology ==
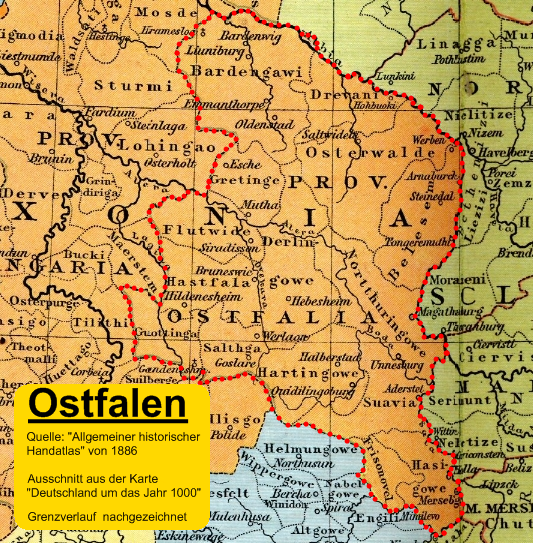
19th century map of Eastphalia circa 1000 CE, showing settlements and subdivisions

The name Ostfalen probably means "east plain". Falen is a Germanic word meaning "flat", "level" and "plain" and is related to the Old Swedish word fala, found today in place names such as Falbygden and Falun, as well as in the northern German town of Fallstedt. The North German Plain of Eastphalia and Westphalia, divided by the Weser river, stands in contrast to the hilly region to the south, the Central Uplands of Franconia and Thuringia. Unlike the name Westphalia, which was perpetuated by the Duchy of Westphalia held by the archbishop-electors of Cologne, the name Eastphalia gradually fell out of use when the Saxon stem duchy dissolved upon the deposition of Duke Henry the Lion in 1180.

German linguists reintroduced the term in the 19th century in the course of researching Eastphalian as a West Low German dialect. With the rise of racial studies in the 19th and early 20th century, mention began to be made – notably by Hans F. K. Günther – of a "Phalian" subtype (fälische Rasse) of an "Aryan race", which he stated was the primary subtype found in Germany.

== History ==
According to the Royal Frankish Annals and the Saxon Poet, the Austreleudi (Eastphalians) under Hessi gave hostages and swore loyalty to Charlemagne at the river Oker in 775. Hessi later converted to Christianity and was made a count. The bishoprics of Halberstadt and Hildesheim were established in Saxony east of the Oker in 804 and 815 respectively. The medieval Duchy of Saxony was divided between the districts of Eastphalia (Ostfalahi), Westphalia, Nordalbingia, and Angria.

The Eastphalian territory at the Harz mountain range was the hereditary lands of Henry the Fowler, the first Saxon duke to become King of the Romans in 919, and his descendants of the Ottonian dynasty. They left several Romanesque abbeys and castles, a cultural landscape that today encompasses three World Heritage Sites with the medieval town of Goslar and Quedlinburg, as well as St. Mary's Cathedral and St. Michael's Church at Hildesheim.

As the Eastphalian territory bordered on the lands of the Polabian Slavs, both along (Drevani) and beyond the Elbe and Saale rivers (Limes Sorabicus), it became the starting point of the German Ostsiedlung ("settling of the East") started by the invasions of King Henry and continued by the Saxon margraves. Sometime after 965, king ad emperor Otto I (936-973) entrusted the defense of northeastern Eastphalian regions, later known as Altmark (meaning: the old march) to count Thiadricus (Dietrich of Haldensleben), placing him in charge over the pacification of neighboring Slavic tribes, such as Redarians and Hevellians.

After the Welf duke Henry the Lion was placed under Imperial ban in 1180, Eastphalia was increasingly subdivided into smaller states, foremost the Welf Duchy of Brunswick-Lüneburg and the counties of Anhalt, Wernigerode and Blankenburg as well as the Imperial city of Goslar, but also the ecclesiastical territories of the Archbishopric of Magdeburg, the prince-bishoprics of Hildesheim and Halberstadt and Quedlinburg Abbey. The Saxon tradition was perpetuated by the Ascanian dukes of Saxe-Wittenberg, who secured for themselves the electoral dignity and later established the Electorate of Saxony on the upper Elbe.

== Subdivisions ==
Eastphalia consisted of several Gaue. The exact list is not known for sure and differs among authorities. From North to South, the Gaue were (where available, modernized names are used):

- Bardengau around Lüneburg (sometimes considered part of Angria, not Eastphalia)
- Drevani (a Slavic tribe)
- Chojna (sometimes considered part of Drevani)
- Osterwalde (Salzwedel)
- Gretinge (Hohne)
- Mulbeze
- Balsamgau (Stendal)
- Flutwidde
- Astfala (Hildesheim)
- Derlingau (Evessen)
- Nordthüringgau
- Gudingau (Elze)
- Valothungo (sometimes considered part of Gudingau)
- Scotelingo (sometimes considered part of Gudingau)
- Aringo (sometimes considered part of Gudingau)
- Flenithi (sometimes considered part of Gudingau)
- Suilbergau
- Ambergau (sometimes considered part of Salzgau)
- Salzgau (Salzgitter)
- Densigau (sometimes considered part of Salzgau)
- Harzgau (Halberstadt)
- Schwabengau
- Hassegau (Mansfeld)
- Friesenfeld (sometimes considered part of Hassegau)

== See also ==
- Altmark

== Sources ==
- Althoff, Gerd (1999). "Saxony and the Elbe Slavs in the Tenth Century". The New Cambridge Medieval History. Vol. 3. Cambridge: Cambridge University Press. pp. 267–292.
- Bachrach, David S. (2012). Warfare in Tenth-Century Germany. Woodbridge: The Boydell Press.
- Reuter, Timothy (1992). The Annals of Fulda. Manchester and New York: Manchester University Press.
- Scholz, Bernhard Walter; Rogers, Barbara, eds. (1970). Carolingian Chronicles: Royal Frankish Annals and Nithard's Histories. Ann Arbor: University of Michigan Press.
- Stieldorf, Andrea (2026) [2012]. Marken und Markgrafen: Studien zur Grenzsicherung durch die fränkisch-deutschen Herrscher (2nd ed.). Wiesbaden: Harrassowitz Verlag.
