= Count palatine =

High noble title

A count palatine (Latin comes palatinus), also count of the palace or palsgrave (from German Pfalzgraf), was originally an official attached to a royal or imperial palace or household and later a nobleman of a rank above that of an ordinary count. The title originated in the Late Roman Empire. In the Middle Ages especially and into modern times, it is associated with the Holy Roman Empire, especially the Electoral Palatinate.

The office, jurisdiction or territory of a count palatine was a county palatine or palatinate. In England the forms earl palatine and palatine earldom are rare alternative terms.

== Importance of a count palatine in medieval Europe ==
=== Comes palatinus ===
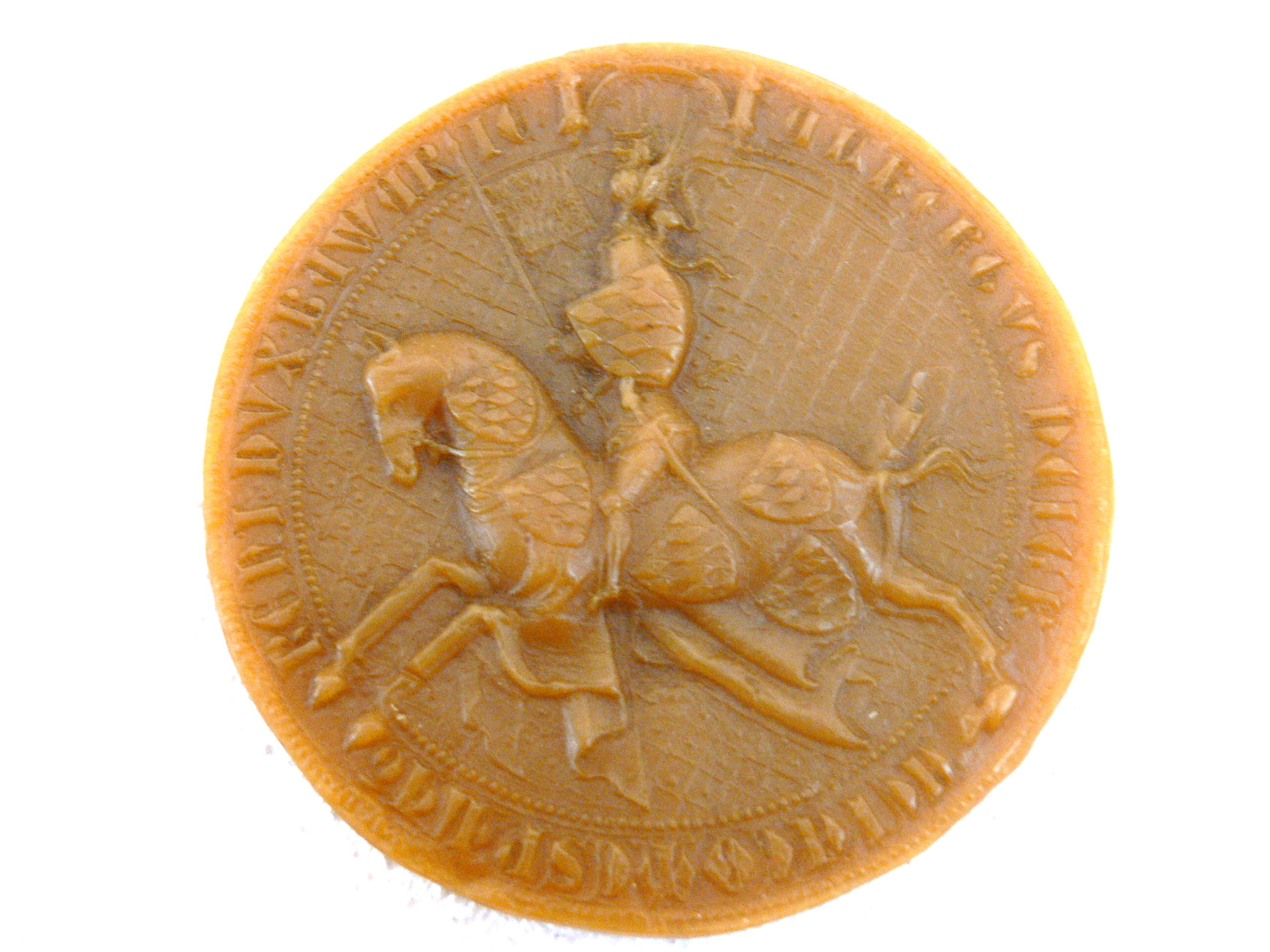
Seal of Albert I, Duke of Bavaria, describing him as Comes Palatinus Reni ("count palatine of the Rhine")

This Latin title is the original, but is also pre-feudal: it originated as Roman comes, which was a non-hereditary court title of high rank meaning "companion" and connoting the status of peer, the specific part palatinus being the adjective derived from palatium ('palace').

After the fall of Rome, a new feudal type of title, also known simply as palatinus, started developing. The Frankish kings of the Merovingian dynasty (reigned 480–750) employed a high official, the comes palatinus, who at first assisted the king in his judicial duties and at a later date discharged many of these himself. Other counts palatine were employed on military and administrative work.

In the Visigothic Kingdom, the Officium Palatinum consisted of a number of men with the title of count who managed the various departments of the royal household. The Comes Cubiculariorum oversaw the chamberlains, the Comes Scanciorum directed the cup-bearers, the Comes Stabulorum directed the equerries in charge of the stables, etc. The Ostrogothic Kingdom also maintained palatine counts with titles such as Comes Patrimonii, who was in charge of the patrimonial or private real estate of the king, and others.

The system was maintained by the Carolingian sovereigns (reigned 751–987), who increased the power of counts palatine through successive grants of authority. A Frankish capitulary of 882 and Hincmar, archbishop of Reims, writing about the same time, attest to the extent to which the judicial work of the Frankish Empire had passed into the hands of counts palatine.

Instead of remaining near the person of the king, some of the counts palatine were sent to various parts of his empire to act as judges and governors, the districts ruled by them being called palatinates. Being in a special sense the representatives of the sovereign, they were entrusted with more extended power than the ordinary counts. In this way came about the later and more general use of the word "palatine", its application as an adjective to persons entrusted with special powers—but also to the districts over which these powers were exercised.

By the High Middle Ages, the title "count" had become increasingly common, to the point that both great magnates who ruled regions that were the size of duchies, and local castle-lords, might style themselves "count." As the great magnates began to centralize their power over their local castle-lords, they felt the need to assert the difference between themselves and these minor "counts". Therefore, several of these great magnates began styling themselves "Count palatine", signifying great counts ruling regions equivalent to duchies, such as the Counts Palatine of Champagne in the 13th century. See also Royal Administration of Merovingian and Carolingian Dynasties.

=== Related titles ===
In early medieval Poland, the Palatinus was next in rank to the King. As he is also the chief commander of the King's army the rank is merged with Wojewoda, with the latter replacing the title of Palatine. During the Fragmentation of Poland each Prince would have his own voivode. When some of these Principalities were reunited into the Kingdom of Poland, the Palatines were infeudated with them, as there was no longer a local Prince to rule on behalf of the King to whom all these princely titles returned. The Principalities are thus made Voivodships (sometimes translated as Palatinates). In the Polish–Lithuanian Commonwealth the Voivodes sit in the Senate. Throughout its history, the dignity remained non-hereditary, or semi-hereditary. Today voivodes are government officials.

As successor to the Byzantine emperor after the fall of Constantinople in 1453, the Ottoman sultan also claimed the right to bestow the office. Thus Giovanni Bellini was named Comes palatinus by Emperor Frederick III in 1469 and later again in 1481 by Sultan Mehmet II.

Grand Čelnik (велики челник). The Grand Čelnik was the highest court title of the Serbian Despotate, and the title-holders held great provinces, property, and honours, and Radič (fl. 1413–1441) was one of the most powerful ones. Hungary in the Middle Ages: nádorispán or nádor (see Palatine of Hungary)

The term count palatine was not used in the United Kingdom. Just as count always remained reserved for continental territories, even though the equivalence of earl became clear by rendering it in Latin also as comes, earl palatine was the exclusively British title for the incumbent of a British county palatine.

== Merovingian and Carolingian Counts palatine ==
=== Robertians ===
- Chrodobertus II, was named comes palatinus on 2 October 678
- Grimbert, probably son of Chrodobertus II, was comes palatinus of Neustria from 691 to 720
- Robert I (also known as Rupert I; d. before 764), grandson of Chrodobertus II, was comes palatinus around 741/742
- Anselm (d. 778 in Roncesvalles), son of Robert
- Adalard of Paris, comes palatinus in 877
- Cobbo the Younger

=== Counts palatine of Champagne ===
King Lothar of France (954–986) gave Herbert III of Omois, one of his most loyal supporters in the struggle against the Robertians, the title of count palatine. The title was later inherited by his nephews, precursors of the counts of Champagne. The title of count of the palace is therefore linked to the title of count of Champagne until its extinction in 1305.

== Holy Roman Empire ==
Pfalzgraf (Old High German phalanzgrāvo) is the German equivalent of the title, Graf being the German term for "count" or "earl", and Pfalz being the German reflex of Latin palatium. The German title has also been rendered as palsgrave in English (recorded 1548).

Counts Palatine were the permanent representatives of the Frankish king, later of the Holy Roman Emperor, in a palatial domain of the crown. There were dozens of these royal Pfalzen throughout the early Empire, and the emperor would travel between them, as there was no imperial capital.

In the empire, the word count palatine was also used to designate the officials who assisted the emperor in exercising the rights which were reserved for his personal consideration, like granting arms. They were called Imperial counts palatine (in Latin comites palatini caesarii, or comites sacri palatii; in German, Hofpfalzgrafen). Both the Latin form (Comes) palatinus and the French (comte) palatin have been used as part of the full title of the Dukes of Burgundy (a branch of the French royal dynasty) to render their rare German title Freigraf, which was the style of a (later lost) bordering principality, the allodial County of Burgundy (Freigrafschaft Burgund in German), which came to be known as Franche-Comté.

During the 11th century, some imperial palatine counts became a valuable political counterweight against the mighty duchies. Surviving old palatine counties were turned into new institutional pillars through which the imperial authority could be exercised. By the reigns of Henry the Fowler and especially of Otto the Great, comites palatini were sent into all parts of the country to support the royal authority by checking the independent tendencies of the great tribal dukes. Apparent thereafter was the existence of a count palatine in Saxony, and of others in Lorraine, in Bavaria and in Swabia, their duties being to administer the royal estates in these duchies.

Next to the Dukes of Lotharingia, Bavaria, Swabia and Saxony, who had become dangerously powerful feudal princes, loyal supporters of the German Emperor were installed as counts palatine.

The Lotharingian palatines out of the Ezzonian dynasty were important commanders of the imperial army and were often employed during internal and external conflicts (e.g. to suppress rebelling counts or dukes, to settle frontier disputes with the Hungarian and the French kingdom and to lead imperial campaigns).

Although a palatinate could belong for decades to one dynasty, the office of the palatine counts became hereditary only during the 12th century. During the 11th century the palatinates were still regarded as beneficia, non-hereditary fiefs. The count palatine in Bavaria, an office held by the family of Wittelsbach, became duke of this land, the lower comital title being then merged into the higher ducal one. The Count Palatine of Lotharingia changed his name to Count Palatine of the Rhine in 1085, alone remaining independent until 1777. The office having become hereditary, Pfalzgrafen were in existence until the dissolution of the Holy Roman Empire in 1806. The palatinate of Saxony merged with the Electoral Duchy of Saxony. The Palatinate of the Rhine became an electorate, and both were Imperial Vicars.

=== Counts palatine of Bavaria ===
Originally, the counts palatine held the County Palatine (around Regensburg), and were subordinate to the dukes of Bavaria, rather than to the king. The position gave its holder a leading position in the legal system of the duchy.

- Meginhard I, count palatine in 883
- Arnulf II (d. 954), son of Duke Arnulf I of Bavaria, constructed Scheyern Castle around 940
- Berthold (d. 999), son of Arnulf II, count palatine between 954 and 976 with interruptions, ancestor of the Counts of Andechs
- Hartwig I (d. 985), count palatine from 977 until his death
- Aribo I (d. c. 1020, son-in-law of Hartwig I, count palatine from 985 until his death
- Hartwig II (d. 1027), son of Aribo I, count palatine from 1020 to 1026
- Aribo II (d. 1102), son of Hartwig II, count palatine from 1026 to 1055
- Kuno I (d. c. 1082/1083)
- Rapoto I (d. 1099), count palatine from c. 1083 to 1093
- Engelbert I (d. 1122), nephew of both of Aribo II's wives, count palatine from 1099 to 1120
- Otto IV (c. 1083 – 1156), probably a descendant of Arnulf II, count palatine from 1120 until his death. He moved his residence from Scheyern Castle to Wittelsbach Castle and founded the House of Wittelsbach.
- Otto V (c. 1117 – 1183), count palatine from 1156 to 1180. He became duke in 1180; his descendants ruled the duchy until 1918.
- Otto VII (d. 1189), younger son of Otto IV, count palatine from 1180 until his death
- Otto VIII (d. 1209), son of Otto VII, count palatine from 1189 to 1208, infamous for murdering King Philip of Germany in 1208
- Rapoto II (d. 1231), brother-in-law of Otto VIII, count palatine from 1208 until his death
- Rapoto III (d. 1248), son of Rapoto II, count palatine from 1231 until his death. He was the last count palatine; after his death the duke of Bavaria assumed the rights and possessions of the counts palatine.

=== Counts palatine of Lotharingia ===
- Wigeric (915 – before 922), Count Palatine of Lotharingia and Count in the Bidgau
- Gottfried (c. 905 – after 949), Count Palatine of Lotharingia and Count in the Jülichgau

From 985, the Ezzonids held the title:

- Herman I (d. before 996), Count Palatine of Lotharingia and Count in the Bonngau, the Eiffelgau, the Zülpichgau and the Auelgau
- Ezzo (d. 1034), son of Herman I, Count in the Auelgau and the Bonngau, Count Palatine of Lotharingia from 1020, married Mathilda of Saxony, the daughter of Emperor Otto II
- Otto (d. 1047), son of Ezzo, Count Palatine of Lotharingia from 1035 to 1045, then Duke of Swabia as Otto II from 1045 until his death
- Henry I (d. 1061), son of Ezzo's brother Hezzelin I, Count Palatine of Lotharingia from 1045 to 1060
- Herman II (1049–1085), son of Henry I, Count Palatine of Lotharingia from 1061 to 1085 (until 1064 under the guardianship of Anno II, Archbishop of Cologne), also Count in the Ruhrgau and the Zülpichgau and Count of Brabant

The County Palatine of Lotharingia was suspended by the Emperor. Adelaide of Weimar-Orlamünde, Herman II's widow, remarried to Henry of Laach. About 1087 he was assigned in the newly created office of Count Palatine of the Rhine.

=== Counts palatine of the Rhine ===
In 1085, after the death of Herman II, the County Palatine of Lotharingia lost its military importance in Lorraine. The territorial authority of the Count Palatine was reduced to his territories along the Rhine. Consequently, he is called the Count Palatine of the Rhine after 1085.

The Golden Bull of 1356 made the Count Palatine of the Rhine one of the seven electors. He was therefore known as the Elector Palatine.

=== Counts palatine of Saxony ===
In the 10th century the Emperor Otto I created the County Palatine of Saxony in the Saale-Unstrut area of southern Saxony. The honour was initially held by a Count of Hessengau, then from the early 11th century by the Counts of Goseck, later by the Counts of Sommerschenburg, and still later by the Landgraves of Thuringia:

- Adalbero (d. 982) was a Count in the Hessengau and in the Liesgau, Count Palatine of Saxony from 972,
- Dietrich (d. 995), probably a son of Adalbero, was Count Palatine of Saxony from 992
- Frederick (d. July 1002 or 15 March 1003), Count in the Harzgau and in the Nordthüringgau, was Count Palatine of Saxony from 995 to 996
- Burchard I (d. after 3 November 1017), the first count of Goseck to hold the title, was a count in the Hassegau from 991, Count Palatine of Saxony from 1003, Count of Merseburg from 1004, and imperial governor from 1012
- Siegfried (d. 25 April 1038), was Count Palatine of Saxony in 1028
- Frederick I (d. 1042), a younger son of Burchard I, was Count of Goseck and in the Hassegau and was Count Palatine of Saxony in 1040
- William (d. 1062), Count of Weimar, probably Count Palatine of Saxony in 1042
- Dedo (fell in battle in Pöhlde on 5 May 1056), son of Frederick I, Count Palatine of Saxony from 1042 to 1044
- Frederick II (d. 27 May 1088), younger brother of Dedo, Count Palatine of Saxony in 1056
- Frederick III (murdered near Zscheiplitz on 5 February 1087), son of Frederick II
- Frederick IV (d. 1125 in Dingelstedt am Huy), son of Frederick III, Count Palatine in 1114
- Frederick V (d. 18 October 1120 or 1121), grandson of Frederick I, Count of Sommerschenburg, Count Palatine of Saxony in 1111
- Frederick VI (d. 19 May 1162), son of Frederick V, Count of Sommerschenburg, Count Palatine of Saxony from 1123 to 1124
- Herman II (murdered on 30 January 1152), Count of Formbach, Margrave of Meissen from 1124 to 1130 (deposed), Count Palatine of Saxony from 1129 to 1130, married in 1148 to Liutgard of Stade, who had divorced Frederick VI in 1144
- Adalbert (d. 1179), son of Frederick VI, Count Palatine of Sommerschenburg from 1162 until his death
- Louis III (d. 1190), Landgrave of Thuringia from 1172 until his death, appointed Count Palatine of Saxony on the Diet of Gelnhausen on 13 April 1180, abdicated in favour of Herman I in 1181
- Herman III (c. 1155 – 25 April 1215 in Gotha), younger brother of Louis III, Count Palatine of Saxony from 1181 until his death, Landgrave of Thuringia from 1190 until his death
- Louis IV (28 October 1200 – 11 September 1227), son of Herman I, Count Palatine of Saxony and Landgrave of Thuringia from 1217 until his death
- Henry Raspe (1204 – 16 February 1247), son of Herman I, Landgrave of Thuringia from 1227 until his death, Count Palatine of Saxony from 1231 until his death, anti-king of Germany opposing Frederick II and his son Conrad IV from 1246

After Henry Raspe's death, the County Palatine of Saxony and the Landgraviate of Thuringia were given to the House of Wettin, based on a promise made by Emperor Frederick II:

- Henry III (c. 1215 – 15 February 1288), Margrave of Meissen from 1227 until his death, Count Palatine of Saxony and Landgrave of Thuringia from 1247 1265
- Albert II the Degenerate (1240 – 20 November 1314), son of Henry III, Count Palatine of Saxony and Landgrave of Thuringia from 1265 until his death, Margrave of Meissen from 1288 to 1292
- Frederick VII the Bitten (1257 – 16 November 1323), son of Albert II, Count Palatine of Saxony from 1280 to before 1291, Margrave of Meissen before 1291 until his death, Landgrave of Thuringia from 1298 until his death

King Rudolph I of Germany gave the County Palatine of Saxony to the House of Welf:

- Henry I (August 1267 – 7 September 1322), Count Palatine of Saxony from before 1291 until his death, Prince of Brunswick-Grubenhagen from 1291 until his death
- ...

=== Counts palatine of Swabia ===
- Erchanger I, also known as Berchtold I, Count Palatine of Swabia in 880/892
- Erchanger II (d. 21 January 917), probably a son of Erchanger I, was Count Palatine of Swabia and Missus dominicus and from 915 until his death Duke of Swabia
- [...]
- Frederick I, (c. 1020 – shortly after 1053), Count Palatine of Swabia from 1027 to 1053
- Frederick II (c. 997/999 – c. 1070/1075), father of Frederick I and ancestor of the Hohenstaufen dynasty, Count Palatine of Swabia from 1053 to 1069
- Manegold the Elder (c. 1034/1043 – shortly before summer 1094), son-in-law of Frederick II, Count Palatine of Swabia from 1070 to 1094
- Louis of Staufen, son of Frederick I, Count Palatine of Swabia from 1094 to 1103, founder of St. Faith's Church, Sélestat
- Louis of Westheim, probably a son of his predecessor, Count Palatine of Swabia from 1103 to 1112
- Manegold the Younger, son of Manegold the Elder, Count Palatine of Swabia from 1112 to 1125
- Adalbert of Lauterburg, son of Manegold the Elder, Count Palatine of Swabia from 1125 to 1146

After 1146, the title went to the Counts Palatine of Tübingen.

=== Counts palatine of Tübingen ===
- Hugo I (1146–1152)
- Frederick (d. 1162) co-ruler with Hugo II
- Hugo II (1152–1182)
- Rudolf I (1182–1219)
- Hugo III (1185– c. 1228/30) co-ruler with Rudolf I and Rudolf II, went on to found the Montfort-Bregenz lineage
- Rudolf II (d. 1247)
- Hugo IV (d. 1267)
- Eberhard (d. 1304)
- Gottfried I (d. 1316)
- Gottfried II (d. 1369) sold the County Palatine of Tübingen to the Württemberg dynasty, went on to found the Tübingen-Lichteneck lineage

=== Counts palatine of Burgundy ===
In 1169, Emperor Frederick I created the Free County of Burgundy (not to be confused with its western neighbour, the Duchy of Burgundy). The Counts of Burgundy had the title of Free Count (German: Freigraf), but are sometimes called Counts Palatine.

== Holy See ==
=== Papal counts palatine ===
A papal count palatine (Comes palatinus lateranus, properly Comes sacri Lateranensis palatii "Count of the Sacred Palace of Lateran") began to be conferred by the pope in the 16th century. This title was merely honorary and by the 18th century had come to be conferred so widely as to be nearly without consequence.

The Order of the Golden Spur began to be associated with the inheritable patent of nobility in the form of count palatinate during the Renaissance; Emperor Frederick III named Baldo Bartolini, professor of civil law at the University of Perugia, a count palatinate in 1469, entitled in turn to confer university degrees.

Pope Leo X designated all of the secretaries of the papal curia Comites aulae Lateranensis ("Counts of the Lateran court") in 1514 and bestowed upon them the rights similar to an imperial count palatine. In some cases the title was conferred by specially empowered papal legates. If an imperial count palatine possessed both an imperial and the papal appointment, he bore the title of "Comes palatine imperiali Papali et auctoritate" (Count palatine by Imperial and Papal authority).

The Order of the Golden Spur, linked with the title of count palatinate, was widely conferred after the Sack of Rome, 1527, by Charles V, Holy Roman Emperor; the text of surviving diplomas conferred hereditary nobility to the recipients. Among the recipients was Titian (1533), who had painted an equestrian portrait of Charles. Close on the heels of the Emperor's death in 1558, its refounding in Papal hands is attributed to Pope Pius IV in 1559. Benedict XIV (In Supremo Militantis Ecclesiæ, 1746) granted to the Knights of the Holy Sepulchre the right to use the title of Count of the Sacred Palace of Lateran.

By the mid-18th century the Order of the Golden Spur was being so indiscriminately bestowed that Casanova remarked "The Order they call the Golden Spur was so disparaged that people irritated me greatly when they asked me the details of my cross;"

The Order was granted to "those in the pontifical government, artists, and others, whom the pope should think deserving of reward. It is likewise given to strangers, no other condition being required, but that of professing the catholic religion."

== See also ==
- Imperial Vicar
- Count Palatine (Imperial)
- County palatine of Cephalonia and Zakynthos
- Kaiserpfalz
- Paladin
- Count palatine of Hungary

== Sources ==
- Etymonline.com
- Titles of counts palatine of Burgundy
- Titles of counts palatine of the Rhine
- Westermann, Großer Atlas zur Weltgeschichte (has a map of known Pfalz sites) (in German)
