= Hessi =

Leader of the Eastphalian Saxons (died 804)

Hessi (also Hassi or Hassio; died 804) was a leader of the Eastphalian Saxons in 775 and later a Christian monk.

== Life ==
At the time of the early Saxon Wars, Hessi was one of the leaders of the Eastphalian Saxons. He is one of the few pagan Saxon leaders named in Frankish annals. The Vita Liutbirgae, a life of Saint Liutbirga, describes Hessi as "among the foremost and noblest of his people". In 775, according to the Royal Frankish Annals, "all the Saxon Austreleudi under Hassi came before him, gave as many hostages as he desired, and swore oaths of fealty to" Charlemagne at the river Oker. The word "all" may imply that Hessi had mustered the entire fighting force of the Eastphalians (Austreleudi). On the other hand, his decision not to hold his strong defensive position against a Frankish river crossing may indicate that his force was far smaller than the opposing army and that he led only the men of his Gau (shire), a position denoted in the sources by the title satrap. The Saxon Poet records the same incident thus:

Charles then came into the regions of the Ostphalians and encamped near the river Ocker. There a certain Hessi, one of their chieftains, came to meet him, as a suppliant; likewise all the people of that region came to Charles, gave hostages which he ordered, and promised with solemn oath that they would keep their pledge of faith to the king.

Hessi later converted to Christianity and was made a count. According to the Vita, Charlemagne "heaped great honors upon him, because he found Hessi to be completely loyal." He seems to have profited from the Frankish conquest. After his only son died young, Hessi gave his lands to his surviving daughters and retired to the Abbey of Fulda. The Vita describes his monastic life as "serving the Lord as a soldier". He died there in 804, as recorded in the monastic necrology.

== Family ==
The name of Hessi's wife is unknown. The names of his daughter, Gisla, and of one of her daughters, Hruothild, were both in use by the Carolingian dynasty and it has been speculated that she was a relative of Charlemagne. This would put there marriage no earlier than 775.

The number of Hessi's daughters is unknown. Only Gisla is known by name. She married a count named Unwan, whose identity is uncertain. He may have been a Frank, but more probably was a Saxon. If he was the Unwan whose death is recorded in 795, their children must have been born between about 791 and 796. They had three: Hruothild, Bilihild and Bernhard, in that order.

In the 820s, Gisla founded two houses for nuns, placing each under the rule of one of her widowed daughters: Karsbach, with Hruothild as abbess, and Wendhausen, with Bilihild as abbess. She made Bernhard her heir. With Reginhild, his first wife, Bernard had two children (Bernhard, Otwin) and with his second wife, Helmburg, six more (Unwan, Adalbert, Asic, Ediram, Gisla, Bilihild).

The family of Hessi's descendants can be constructed largely from the Vita Liutbirgae. Liutbirga was hired by Gisla shortly after Hessi's death to help raise her children and manage her lands. She continued for some years in the employ of Bernhard after Gisla's death around 830. Eventually she became an anchoress at Wendhausen. The Vita Liutbirgae functions in one respect as a memorial of the Franco-Saxon family of Hessi.

Several counts named Hessi are attested in Franconia in the 9th century. They are probably descendants of Hessi through his unnamed daughters.

== Bibliography ==
- Althoff, Gerd (1999). "Saxony and the Elbe Slavs in the Tenth Century". In Reuter, Timothy (ed.). The New Cambridge Medieval History. Vol. 3: c.900 – c.1024. Cambridge University Press. pp. 267–292.
- Bachrach, Bernard (2013). Charlemagne's Early Campaigns (768–777): A Diplomatic and Military Analysis. Brill.
- Cragle, Joshua M. (2024). Converting the Saxons: A Study of Violence and Religion in Early Medieval Germany. Routledge.
- Flierman, Robert (2017). Saxon Identities, AD 150–900. Bloomsbury.
- McKinney, Mary Emma (1956). The Saxon Poet's Life of Charles the Great. Pageant Press.
- Paxton, Frederick S. (2009). Anchoress and Abbess in Ninth-Century Saxony: The Lives of Liutbirga of Wendhausen and Hathumoda of Gandersheim. Catholic University of America Press.
- Rembold, Ingrid (2018). Conquest and Christianization: Saxony and the Carolingian World, 772–888. Cambridge University Press.
- Scholz, Bernhard Walter, ed. (1970). Carolingian Chronicles: Royal Frankish Annals and Nithard's Histories. University of Michigan Press.
- Signori, Gabriela (2010). "Anchorites in German-speaking Regions". In Liz Herbert McAvoy (ed.). Anchoritic Traditions of Medieval Europe. The Boydell Press. pp. 43–61.
- Wood, Ian (2003). "Beyond Satraps and Ostriches: Political and Social Structures of the Saxons in the Early Carolingian Period". In Dennis Howard Green; Frank Siegmund (eds.). The Continental Saxons from the Migration Period to the Tenth Century: An Ethnographica Perspective. The Boydell Press. pp. 271–297.
