= Balsamgau =

The Balsamgau (or Belcsem, Balsami) was an early medieval Gau (shire) in the Eastphalia region of the Duchy of Saxony. It was centered on Stendal and located on the West bank of the River Elbe. Other towns in the Balsamgau include Arneburg, Döbbelin, Elversdorf, Windberge. It was bordered by the following shires: Osterwalde, Liezizi, Morazani, Nordthüringgau.

By the 12th century, the Balsamgau had become a part of the Margraviate of Brandenburg. Together with Osterwalde, it formed the westernmost part of Brandenburg, which later came to be known as the Altmark.
