= Langenapel =

- Stadtteil of Salzwedel
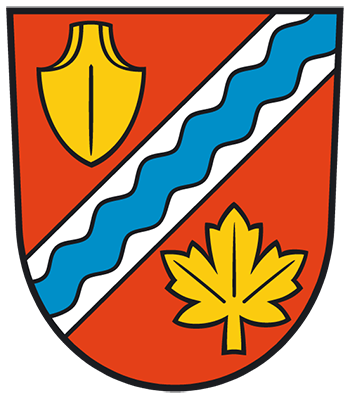
- Coat of arms
- Interactive map of Langenapel
- Location within Germany Location within Saxony-Anhalt
- Coordinates: 52°49′00″N 10°58′00″E
- Country: Germany
- State: Saxony-Anhalt
- District: Altmarkkreis Salzwedel
- Town: Salzwedel

Area
  - Total: 4.55 km^{2} (1.76 sq mi)
- Elevation: 32 m (105 ft)

Population (2006-12-31)
  - Total: 252
  - Density: 55.4/km^{2} (143/sq mi)
- Time zone: UTC+01:00 (CET)
  - Summer (DST): UTC+02:00 (CEST)
- Postal codes: 29413
- Dialling codes: 039038
- Vehicle registration: SAW

Langenapel is a village and a former municipality in the district Altmarkkreis Salzwedel, in Saxony-Anhalt, Germany. Since 1 January 2010, it is part of the town Salzwedel.
