= Bardengau =

Medieval county in the Duchy of Saxony

The Bardengau was a medieval county (Gau) in the Duchy of Saxony. Its main town was Bardowick; other important towns were Lüneburg and Oldenstadt (today Uelzen).

Since the 10th century, members of the House of Billung have been recorded as counts of the Bardengau. Through their heirs, the House of Welf, the Bardengau eventually became part of the Duchy of Brunswick-Lüneburg.

The Bardengau was bordered by the Limes Saxonicus, the Polabians, the Drewani, the Gau Osterwalde, the Derlingau, the Gau Gretinge, the Lohingau, the Gau Sturmi, the Gau Mosde, and the Gau Stormarn. It was part of Eastphalia.

The name of the Heaðobards (Old English: Heaðubeardan, Old Low German: Headubarden, "war-beards") may be reflected in the toponym Bardengau.
