= Wieblitz-Eversdorf =

- Municipality
- Interactive map of Wieblitz-Eversdorf
- Location within Germany Location within Saxony-Anhalt
- Coordinates: 52°48′36″N 11°05′00″E
- Country: Germany
- State: Saxony-Anhalt
- District: Altmarkkreis Salzwedel
- Disbanded: 1 January 2011

Area
  - Total: 9.89 km^{2} (3.82 sq mi)
- Elevation: 45 m (148 ft)

Population (2009-12-31)
  - Total: 290
  - Density: 29/km^{2} (76/sq mi)
- Time zone: UTC+01:00 (CET)
  - Summer (DST): UTC+02:00 (CEST)
- Postal codes: 29413, 29416
- Dialling codes: 03901, 039033
- Vehicle registration: SAW

Wieblitz-Eversdorf is a former municipality in the district Altmarkkreis Salzwedel, in Saxony-Anhalt, Germany. It consisted of the villages Eversdorf, Groß Wieblitz and Klein Wieblitz. On 1 January 2011, it was merged into the town Salzwedel.
