= Henningen =

- Stadtteil of Salzwedel
- Interactive map of Henningen
- Location within Germany Location within Saxony-Anhalt
- Coordinates: 52°50′36″N 10°58′00″E
- Country: Germany
- State: Saxony-Anhalt
- District: Altmarkkreis Salzwedel
- Town: Salzwedel

Area
  - Total: 28.54 km^{2} (11.02 sq mi)
- Elevation: 27 m (89 ft)

Population (2006-12-31)
  - Total: 703
  - Density: 24.6/km^{2} (63.8/sq mi)
- Time zone: UTC+01:00 (CET)
  - Summer (DST): UTC+02:00 (CEST)
- Postal codes: 29413
- Dialling codes: 039038
- Vehicle registration: SAW

Henningen is a village and a former municipality in the district Altmarkkreis Salzwedel, in Saxony-Anhalt, Germany. Since 1 January 2010, it is part of the town Salzwedel.
