= Klein Gartz =

- Stadtteil of Salzwedel
- Interactive map of Klein Gartz
- Location within Germany Location within Saxony-Anhalt
- Coordinates: 52°49′24″N 11°19′00″E
- Country: Germany
- State: Saxony-Anhalt
- District: Altmarkkreis Salzwedel
- Town: Salzwedel

Area
  - Total: 10.52 km^{2} (4.06 sq mi)
- Elevation: 31 m (102 ft)

Population (2006-12-31)
  - Total: 170
  - Density: 16/km^{2} (42/sq mi)
- Time zone: UTC+01:00 (CET)
  - Summer (DST): UTC+02:00 (CEST)
- Postal codes: 29416
- Dialling codes: 039037
- Vehicle registration: SAW

Klein Gartz is a village and a former municipality in the district Altmarkkreis Salzwedel, in Saxony-Anhalt, Germany. Since 1 January 2010, it is part of the town Salzwedel.
