= Harzgau =

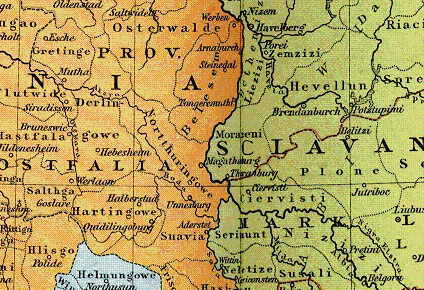
Hartingowe in eastern Saxony about 1000 AD (19th century map)

The Harzgau was a medieval shire (Gau) in the northeastern foorhils of the Harz mountains, part of the Eastphalia region of Saxony.

It included the towns of Halberstadt, Quedlinburg, and Osterwieck, and was bounded by the Oker in the west, by the Großes Bruch swamps in the north, the Bode in the east, and the Harz range in the south. The county was bordered (clockwise) by the Salzgau, the Derlingau, the Nordthüringgau, the Schwabengau, the Thuringian Helmegau, and the Liesgau.

Counts in the Harzgau were:

- Frederick I 875/880
- Frederick II 937 and 945, son of Frederick I.
- Volkmar I (d before 961), probably son of Frederick II.
- Frederick III, son of Volkmar
- Thietmar, Count in the Harzgau and Nordthüringgau, d 3 October 959
- Frederick (d July 1002/15 March 1003), 995 to 996 count palatine in Saxony, Count in the Harzgau and Nordthüringgau
- Liutger, 1013 Count, 1021 Count in the Harzgau, 1013 to 1031 (recorded) (Supplinburger family)
- Bernard (d before 1069), 1052 Count in the Harzgau and Derlingau as well as North Thuringia, 1043 to 1062 (recorded), probably nephew of Liutger
- Gebhard of Supplinburg (d 9 June 1075 in the Battle of Homburg an der Unstrut), 1052 Count in the Harzgau, son of Bernard, father of Lothair III, Holy Roman Emperor

In the course of the Middle Ages the counts of Wernigerode established themselves in this region.

By the 14th century, after the disintegration of the Duchy of Saxony, the Harzgau had been replaced by four smaller states:

- Bishopric of Halberstadt
- Abbacy of Quedlinburg
- County of Wernigerode
- County of Blankenburg
