= Riebau =

- Stadtteil of Salzwedel
- Interactive map of Riebau
- Location within Germany Location within Saxony-Anhalt
- Coordinates: 52°51′36″N 11°16′36″E
- Country: Germany
- State: Saxony-Anhalt
- District: Altmarkkreis Salzwedel
- Town: Salzwedel

Area
  - Total: 19.09 km^{2} (7.37 sq mi)
- Elevation: 22 m (72 ft)

Population (2006-12-31)
  - Total: 305
  - Density: 16.0/km^{2} (41.4/sq mi)
- Time zone: UTC+01:00 (CET)
  - Summer (DST): UTC+02:00 (CEST)
- Postal codes: 29410
- Dialling codes: 039037
- Vehicle registration: SAW

Riebau is a village and a former municipality in the district Altmarkkreis Salzwedel, in Saxony-Anhalt, Germany. Since 1 January 2010, it is part of the town Salzwedel.
