= Benkendorf =

- Stadtteil of Salzwedel
- Interactive map of Benkendorf
- Location within Germany Location within Saxony-Anhalt
- Coordinates: 52°47′36″N 11°16′00″E
- Country: Germany
- State: Saxony-Anhalt
- District: Altmarkkreis Salzwedel
- Town: Salzwedel

Area
  - Total: 10.23 km^{2} (3.95 sq mi)
- Elevation: 34 m (112 ft)

Population (2006-12-31)
  - Total: 196
  - Density: 19.2/km^{2} (49.6/sq mi)
- Time zone: UTC+01:00 (CET)
  - Summer (DST): UTC+02:00 (CEST)
- Postal codes: 29416
- Dialling codes: 039032
- Vehicle registration: SAW

Benkendorf is a village and a former municipality in the district Altmarkkreis Salzwedel, in Saxony-Anhalt, Germany. Since 1 January 2009, it is part of the town Salzwedel.

It derives its name from the ancient noble Benkendorf family, who descend from Johannes De Benkendorpe who lived around the year 1240. They are considered to be one of the oldest and most respected lower noble families in Germany. Variations in spelling include, Benkendorf(f), Benckendorf(f), Beneckendorf(f), Beckendorf(f), von Benkendorf(f) und von Hindenburg, von Beneckendorf(f) und von Hindenburg and several others. Some of the branches use the predicate of von, others however do not.
