= Nicolaus Gercken Family Foundation =

German foundation

The Nicolaus Gercken Family Foundation supports the academic education of the descendants of Nicolaus Gercken, a tailor and mayor of the Northern German city of Salzwedel, who died in 1579. It is a non-profit organisation financing the scholarships from land rental income. Since its inception in 1610, more than 8,000 members who proved they descend from Nicolaus Gercken have been accepted.

== The Foundation ==
=== Significance ===
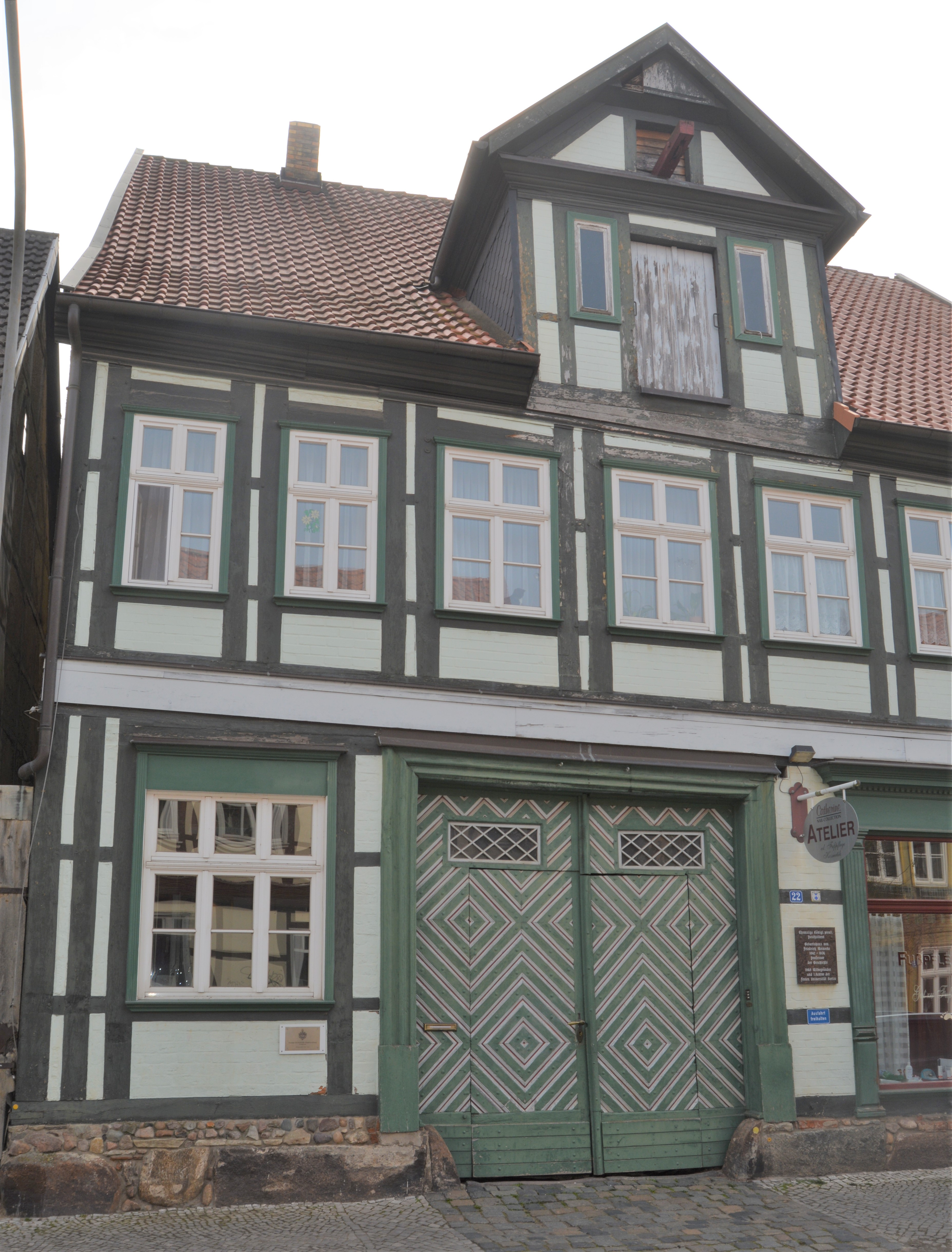
Headquarters of the foundation, Gr. St. Ilsen Str. 22, Salzwedel, Germany

The Nicolaus Gercken foundation was initiated in 1607 in the era of German late renaissance humanism by the will of the founder, Nicolaus Gercken. The founder and his wife Margaretha had no children. They donated their heritage to support the academic education of all descendants of Nicolaus' like-named grandfather. Since the year 1648 to this day the foundation grants a stipend to each registered family member pursuing academic study. The foundation has registered over 8 000 members since its inception in 1610, the year of the founder's passing. She grew through donations but was set back by the wars on German soil, beginning with the Thirty Years' War, (1618 - 1648), the expansion of Prussia, the Seven Year War (1756 - 1763), the Napoleonic Wars (1803 - 1815), the two world wars (1914 - 1918 and 1939 - 1945) and the confiscations of the two totalitarian states on German soil (1933 - 1945 and 1949 - 1989). The foundation started disbursing stipends after the Thirty Years' War ended with the signing of the Westphalian Peace Treaties in 1648. The Westphalian peace marks the beginning of today's political order in continental Europe and serves as a model for world order writ large to this day.

=== Founder ===
Nicolaus Gercken (February 2, 1555 – August 16, 1610), was a legal counsel of the Magdeburg Dome Chapter. From 1571 he attended high school in Magdeburg and went on to study at Rostock University in 1573. In the following year he transferred to Wittenberg University, where he presumably studied theology over the course of three years. Upon graduation he was employed as vice headmaster of the high school in Stendal. From 1580 to 1584 he studied law in Tübingen. He transferred to Speyer in 1585 and returned to Magdeburg in 1586 to settle as a lawyer. In 1590 he married Margaretha Busse. Count Wolff von Braunschweig-Grubenhagen promoted him to become chancellor in 1592 and sent him as an envoy to the imperial court (Reichstag) in Regensburg in 1594. In the same year, the Magdeburg Dome Chapter installed him as legal counsel. He served in this role until his dying days and was laid to rest in Magdeburg's St. Sebastian Cathedral.

=== Testament ===
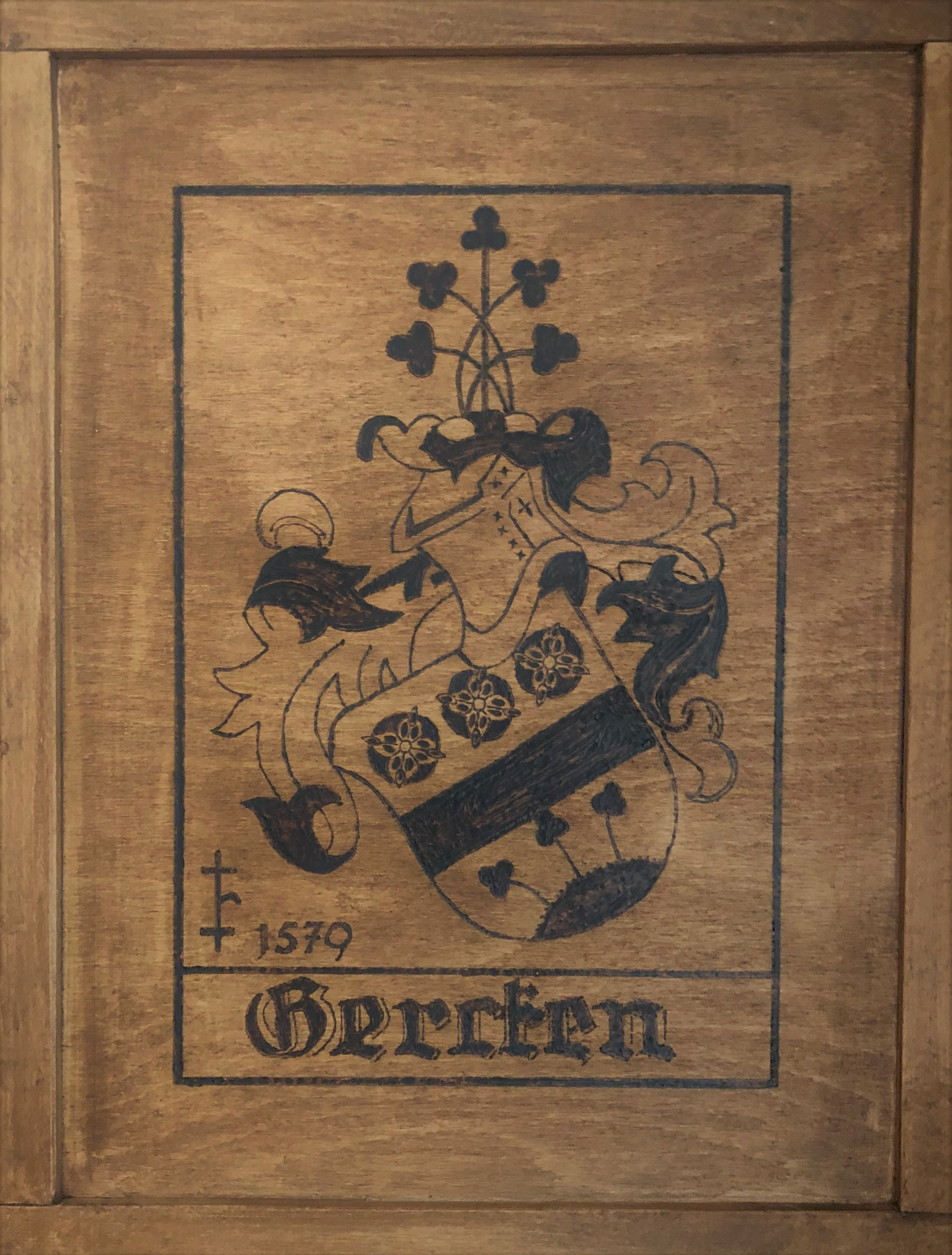
Coat of arms of the Gercken Family Foundation. It dates back to 1579, the year the grandfather of the founder passed away.

Nicolaus Gercken signed and sealed his will (Latin: testament) on November 27, 1607. The original was lost during the Thirty Years' War either in the Sack of Magdeburg or through intential criminal destruction. Handwritten copies of the will and the original of an inventory of the heritage of Nicolaus dated June 6, 1611, are preserved in the Salzwedel city archive to this day. These documents were written by the notary public Petrus Schultze of Altenhausen, whose sons authenticated and sealed the copies in 1654 in the presence of Sebastian Gercken, a foundation counsellor. The sealed original of a debt obligation from 1649 by the city of Magdeburg to Sebastian is also preserved in the Salzwedel city archive. In 1865 a statute was formalized, which defines the decision processes within the foundation. It is valid in modernized form to this day

=== Family conference ===
The statute prescribes the foundation's three organs, the family conference, the patronate and the financial auditors. The decisive organ is the family conference, to which all members are invited every three years to Salzwedel. The family conference elects the members of the patronate and two financial auditors for six years. The first family conference was held in 1873. The 27th family conference was held on May 15, 2022.

=== Patronate ===
The foundation is currently led by a patron and two counsellors. The Patronate meets about four times a year. The patronate decides on the conditions for the rental contracts, the purchase of land, the granting of stipends and the disbursement of any other foundation funds. Work for the patronate is voluntary.

In lieu of all those who have contributed to the foundation over the centuries, seven personae are mentioned here (i) Georg Gercken, a cousin of the founder, was appointed first patron by the family in 1610. (ii) Sebastian Gercken, Georg's son, served as counsellor to the foundation (iii) at a time when his brother Valentin Gercken served as second patron of the foundation. Sebastian reestablished the foundation after the Thirty Years' War. Thanks to his work the foundation was able to pay out stipends from 1648 onwards. (iv) Johann Friedrich Danneil. served as counsellor to the foundation from 1821 to 1868. The Salzwedel city museum is named after him. (v) Paul Gerhardt reestablished the foundation in the 1980s after most of her property was confiscated or destroyed during the 12-year reign of the Nazis followed by the 40-year reign of the East German communist regime. He served as patron from 1994 to 2001 and as honorary patron until he died in 2011. (vi) In 2013, Christiane Peters was the first woman to be elected patron. She is serving her office to this day. (vii) In 2022, Dr. Eckart Reihlen was elected as 23rd patron of the foundation.

== Literature ==
- Patronat der Gerckenschen Familienstiftung (Hrsg.): Geschichte der Familienstiftung des Domsyndikus Nicolaus Gercken. Salzwedel 2001.
- Hans-Joachim Krost: Philipp Wilhelm Gercken zum 270. Geburtstag und zum 200. Todestag
- Over the centuries, the foundation's land rental income fell relative to the cost of an academic education. As industrialization progressed, the share of the German population working in agriculture fell from about 60% in 1900 to about 2% in 2020. Likewise, the share of agriculture in the gross value-added of the German economy shrank to below 1%
- The 400th anniversary of the founder's death was covered extensively by the press.
