= Steinitz, Germany =

Steinitz
- Ortsteil of Salzwedel
- Interactive map of Steinitz
- Location within Germany Location within Saxony-Anhalt
- Coordinates: 52°50′00″N 11°07′00″E
- Country: Germany
- State: Saxony-Anhalt
- District: Altmarkkreis Salzwedel
- Town: Salzwedel

Area
  - Total: 8.20 km^{2} (3.17 sq mi)
- Elevation: 33 m (108 ft)

Population (2009-12-31)
  - Total: 478
  - Density: 58.3/km^{2} (151/sq mi)
- Time zone: UTC+01:00 (CET)
  - Summer (DST): UTC+02:00 (CEST)
- Postal codes: 29410
- Dialling codes: 03901
- Vehicle registration: SAW

Steinitz is a village and a former municipality in the district Altmarkkreis Salzwedel, in Saxony-Anhalt, Germany. Since January 2011, it is part of the town Salzwedel.
