= Liesten =

- Stadtteil of Salzwedel
- Interactive map of Liesten
- Location within Germany Location within Saxony-Anhalt
- Coordinates: 52°47′24″N 11°17′48″E
- Country: Germany
- State: Saxony-Anhalt
- District: Altmarkkreis Salzwedel
- Town: Salzwedel

Area
  - Total: 9.72 km^{2} (3.75 sq mi)
- Elevation: 42 m (138 ft)

Population (2006-12-31)
  - Total: 306
  - Density: 31.5/km^{2} (81.5/sq mi)
- Time zone: UTC+01:00 (CET)
  - Summer (DST): UTC+02:00 (CEST)
- Postal codes: 29416
- Dialling codes: 039032
- Vehicle registration: SAW

Liesten is a village and a former municipality in the district Altmarkkreis Salzwedel, in Saxony-Anhalt, Germany. Since 1 January 2010, it is part of the town Salzwedel.
