= Derlingau =

Early medieval county in the Duchy of Saxony

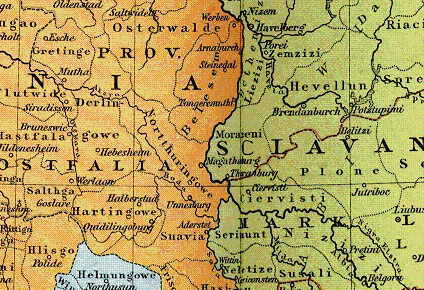
Derlingowe in Saxony, about 1000

The Derlingau was an early medieval county (Gau) of the Duchy of Saxony.

== Geography ==
The Derlingau approximately consisted of the area between the river Oker in the west and the Lappwald forest in the east. It was bordered by (from the north, clockwise): Bardengau, Gau Osterwald, Nordthüringgau, Harzgau, Salzgau, Hastfalagau, Gau Flutwide, Gau Gretinge. The most important town was Evessen, and later Brunswick. The Derlingau belonged to the diocese of the Bishop of Halberstadt.

== History ==
Little is known about the history of the county. The Brunones were its most powerful family in the 10th and 11th centuries; when the Brunones became extinct, their properties were inherited by Lothair of Supplinburg, who became duke of Saxony and later Holy Roman Emperor. From Lothair, Duke Henry the Lion and his descendants, the dukes of Brunswick-Lüneburg, inherited these properties. After the disintegration of the Duchy of Saxony in the early 13th century, the Derlingau thus became a core part of the new Duchy of Brunswick-Lüneburg, together with several adjacent counties.

The northern border of the Derlingau later developed into part of the border between the principalities of Wolfenbüttel and Lüneburg. The eastern and southern border of the Derlingau continues to exist to this day as the border between Lower Saxony and Saxony-Anhalt.

The known counts in the Derlingau include:

- Brun, son of Liudolf, Count in the Nordthüringgau, 965 (Brunonen)
- Dietrich of Haldensleben, 966–985
- Lothair of Walbeck, since 982
- Brun of Brunswick (died around 1010), probably the son of Count Brun I, since 990 (Brunonen)
- Ekbert, around 1013 (Billung)
- Liudolf (died 1038), son of Brun II, around 1031 (Brunonen)
- Bernhard (died before 1069), 1052 (Supplinburg)
- Siegfried II of Walbeck (died around 1087)

== Ecclesiastical organization ==
As a part of the Diocese of Halberstadt, the Derlingau was subdivided into the following archidiaconates (ordered approximately from north to south):

- Wittingen
- Meine
- Ochsendorf
- Lucklum
- Räbke
- Atzum
- Schöppenstedt
- Schöningen
- Kissenbrück
- Watenstedt
- Kalme
- Westerode (near Hornburg)
- Osterwieck
