= Nordthüringgau =

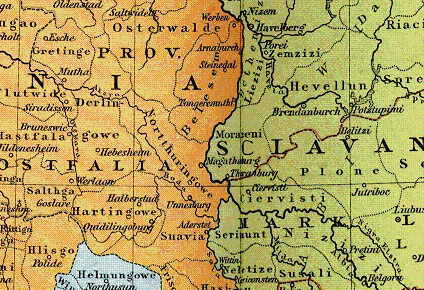
Nortthuringowe in eastern Saxony, about 1000

The Nordthüringgau was a medieval county (German: Gau) in the Eastphalian region of the German stem duchy of Saxony.

== Geography ==
The county was located on both sides of the upper Aller river in present-day Saxony-Anhalt. It was bounded by the Lappwald hill range and the Drömling swamp in the northwest, the River Bode in the southwest, and the Elbe and Saale Rivers in the east, where it bordered on the lands settled by the Polabian Slavs. Towns included the Imperial residence of Magdeburg as well as Haldensleben, Oschersleben, and Calbe.

Neighboring Saxon counties were Osterwalde and Balsamgau in the north, Derlingau in the west, as well as Harzgau and Schwabengau in the south. Beyond Elbe and Saale it bordered on the Morazena, Ciervisti and Serimunt counties, administrative parts of the vast marca Geronis from 937.

== History ==
The Saxon count Christian, probably a scion of the Billung dynasty, was mentioned in the Nordthüringgau about 937. He also ruled in the adjacent Schwabengau and upon the implementation of the marca Geronis in from 945 also over the adjacent Serimunt region beyond the Elbe River, being the brother-in-law of Margrave Gero. Upon his death in 950 he was succeeded by his son Count Thietmar (d. 979), who after the exile of Gunther of Merseburg was appointed Margrave of Meissen in 976. Count Christian' s grandson Gero II (d. 1015) was not able to retain Meissen, but in 993 succeeded his uncle Odo as margrave of the Saxon Eastern March.

The last count in the Nordthüringgau from the Billung dynasty was Thietmar II, Margrave of the Saxon Eastern March from 1015 to 1030. Upon his death, Schwabengau, Harzgau and Nordthüringgau as well as Serimunt were enfeoffed to Esico of Ballenstedt, a maternal grandson of Margrave Odo. Esico became the progenitor of the House of Ascania and his lands over the following generations evolved into the state of Anhalt.

After the deposition of the Saxon duke Henry the Lion in 1180, the lands of the former Nordthüringgau were replaced by the Archbishopric of Magdeburg, the Bishopric of Halberstadt and the Altmark territory of Brandenburg.
