= Chüden =

Village in Saxony-Anhalt, Germany

- Stadtteil of Salzwedel
- Interactive map of Chüden
- Location within Germany Location within Saxony-Anhalt
- Coordinates: 52°51′12″N 11°14′00″E
- Country: Germany
- State: Saxony-Anhalt
- District: Altmarkkreis Salzwedel
- Town: Salzwedel

Area
  - Total: 19.97 km^{2} (7.71 sq mi)
- Elevation: 35 m (115 ft)

Population (2006-12-31)
  - Total: 482
  - Density: 24.1/km^{2} (62.5/sq mi)
- Time zone: UTC+01:00 (CET)
  - Summer (DST): UTC+02:00 (CEST)
- Postal codes: 29410, 29416
- Dialling codes: 03901
- Vehicle registration: SAW

Chüden is a village and a former municipality in the district Altmarkkreis Salzwedel, in Saxony-Anhalt, Germany. Since 1 January 2010, it is part of the town Salzwedel.
