= Jürgen Scharf =

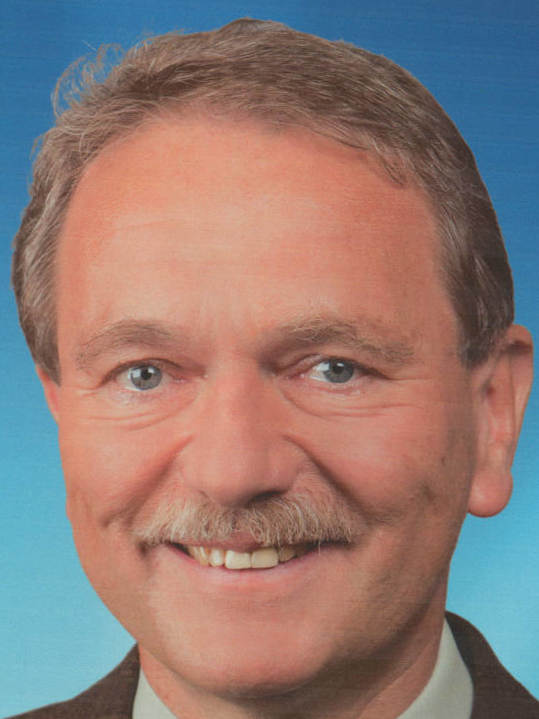
- Jürgen Scharf (2011)
- Born: 15 September 1952 (age 74); Salzwedel, Saxony-Anhalt, East Germany
- Political party: CDU (DDR 1976-1990); CDU (BRD from 1990)
- Spouse: Christel
- Children: 1

Jürgen Scharf (born Salzwedel 15 September 1952) is a German regional politician (CDU). From April 2002 till 2011 he was the leader of the CDU group in the Saxony-Anhalt Regional Assembly.

== Life ==
Jürgen Scharf was born in Salzwedel approximately three years after the birth of the German Democratic Republic. Salzwedel was a small town known for its "Tree ring Cake" located on the eastern side of the border dividing West from East Germany. A few months before his birth the East German government blocked the frontier, and the ensuing three decades saw the construction of an increasingly sophisticated barrier created to protect the German Democratic Republic from western military aggression and/or from the flight of its own working age population. Scharf successfully concluded his schooling in 1971 and went on to study Mathematics at the "Otto-von-Guericke" Technical University in Magdeburg, emerging with a degree in 1975. 1975 was also the year in which his wife gave birth to their daughter. In 1976 he joined the Christian Democratic Union (CDU / Christlich-Demokratische Union Deutschlands), a political party which in the eastern version of Germany was part of the National Front, an organisational structure that kept all political parties and mass organisations under the ultimate control of the country's ruling Socialist Unity Party of Germany (SED / Sozialistische Einheitspartei Deutschlands) until 1989.

He worked, till 1990, in applied research in the field of paints and coatings. Between 1978 and 1983 he also served as district councillor, representing the "Magdeburg south-east" electoral district.

At the time of reunification, in 1990, the eastern and western versions of the CDU (party) also merged, and Scharf became the Party Chairman for Magdeburg. 1990 was also the year in which he was one of the co-founders of the Magdeburg Cathedral School (actually the re-founding of a venerable institution which, prior to 1949, had been able to trace its origins back far enough to number Martin Luther among its alumni). Since 1990 he has been chairman of the works council with Magdeburg Lacke GmbH and the derivative research business separated out of it in 2014, Institut fuer Lacke und Farben e.V.

Following regional elections in October 1990 he became a leading member of the legislative assembly (Landtag) for Saxony-Anhalt, continuing to sit as an assembly member till April 2011. Between 1990 and 1993 and again from 1994 till 2002 he was the CDU group's Assembly Geschäftsfuehrer (literally "parliamentary business leader"), also serving as his party's regional finance spokesman, while between 1993 and 1994 he served as the party's deputy leader there. Between April 2002 and 2011 Jürgen Scharf was the leader of the CDU group in the Saxony-Anhalt Regional Assembly.

Along with his political duties, Scharf was for many years a member of the Synod of Evangelical Churches in the Saxony province. In the past he also served, from 2002, as chairman on the advisory board of the Saxony-Anhalt state lottery.
