= Balthasar Christian Bertram =

German violinist and composer

Balthasar Christian Bertram (died 1787) was a German violinist and composer of the late Baroque era.

== Life ==
Bertram was born in Salzwedel. His birth year is unknown. After studying the violin with Johann Gottlieb Graun, he entered the Hofkapelle of Frederick the Great in Berlin. Here, he worked as a Kammermusikus and violinist in the Opera where he received a salary of 200 Thaler. He remained in Berlin until his death in 1787.

== Works ==
- Sonata in E minor for flute and continuo
- Sonata in C major for viola and continuo
- Sonata in G major for violin and obbligato harpsichord
- Sinfonia in B-flat major for strings and continuo
