= Drevani =

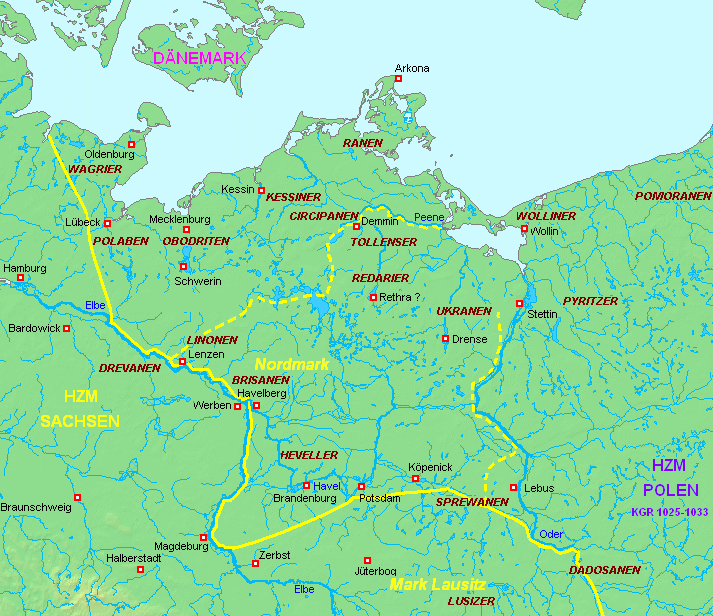
Drevani and other tribes of Polabian Slavs in the 10th century

The Drevani (German: Draväno-Polaben or Drevanen) were a tribe of Polabian Slavs settling on the Elbe river in the area of Wendland, the present-day Lüchow-Dannenberg district of Lower Saxony, in northern Germany. They were a constituent tribe of the Obodrite confederacy.

To the west, Drevani were bordering the Saxons, that were conquered by the Frankish king and emperor Charlemagne during the Saxon Wars (772–804). In the course of the 9th century, territory of Drevani was also conquered by the expanding Carolingian Empire and gradually incorporated into the Duchy of Saxony. According to the Royal Frankish Annals, Charlemagne placed a frontier commander Odo with the garrison of Eastphalians (Eastern Saxons) at the fortress Höhbeck on Elba, that was temporarily captured by the neighboring Slavic Wilzi in 810, but retaken by Franks already in 811, and by 822 the region of Arendsee in Altmark was considered as part of Eastphalia (Eastern Saxony), bordering the Slavs (Sorbian March).

Subjugation of Slavic tribes along the Elbe river was intensified during the 10th century, and sometime after 965, king ad emperor Otto I (936–973) entrusted the defense of northeastern Eastphalian regions, later known as Altmark (meaning: the old march) to count Thiadricus (Dietrich of Haldensleben), placing him in charge over the pacification of neighboring Slavic tribes over the Elbe river, such as Redarians and Hevellians.

The lands where the Drevani lived is today also known as the Wendland, named after the Wends. The local Slavic language (Polabian) died out in the mid-18th century. The name Drevani means "people of woods/trees" in Polabian (from drevo "tree"). It has survived in the name of the Drawehn hills.

== See also ==
- Slavic revolt of 983
- Wendland
- Altmark
- Eastphalia

== Sources ==
- Althoff, Gerd (1999). "Saxony and the Elbe Slavs in the Tenth Century". The New Cambridge Medieval History. Vol. 3. Cambridge: Cambridge University Press. pp. 267–292.
- Bachrach, David S. (2012). Warfare in Tenth-Century Germany. Woodbridge: The Boydell Press.
- Scholz, Bernhard Walter; Rogers, Barbara, eds. (1970). Carolingian Chronicles: Royal Frankish Annals and Nithard's Histories. Ann Arbor: University of Michigan Press.
- Stieldorf, Andrea (2026) [2012]. Marken und Markgrafen: Studien zur Grenzsicherung durch die fränkisch-deutschen Herrscher (2nd ed.). Wiesbaden: Harrassowitz Verlag.
- Stone, Gerald (2016). Slav Outposts in Central European History: The Wends, Sorbs and Kashubs. London and New York: Bloomsbury Academic.
- Firckse, A., Die preussische Bevölkerung nach ihrer Muttersprache, "Zeitschrift des königlich-preußischen staatlichen Bureaus" 1893, Bd. XXXIII.
- Heydzianka-Piłatowa J., Przebieg wynarodowienia Drzewian połabskich w świetle kroniki chłopskiej Jana Parum Schulzego, "Studia z Filologii Polskiej i Słowiańskiej" XIX, 1980, s. 131–136.
- Muka, A., Szczątki języka połabskiego Wendów Luneburskich, [in:] Materiały i prace Komisyi językowej Akademii Umiejętności w Krakowie, t. I, Kraków 1904, s. 313–569.
- Polański K., Problem różnic gwarowych w języku połabskim, "Studia z Filologii Polskiej i Słowiańskiej" V, 1965, s. 365–369.
- Rost P., Die Sprachreste der Draväno-Polaben im Hannöverschen, Leipzig 1907.
