= Hermann Hager =

German writer on pharmacy

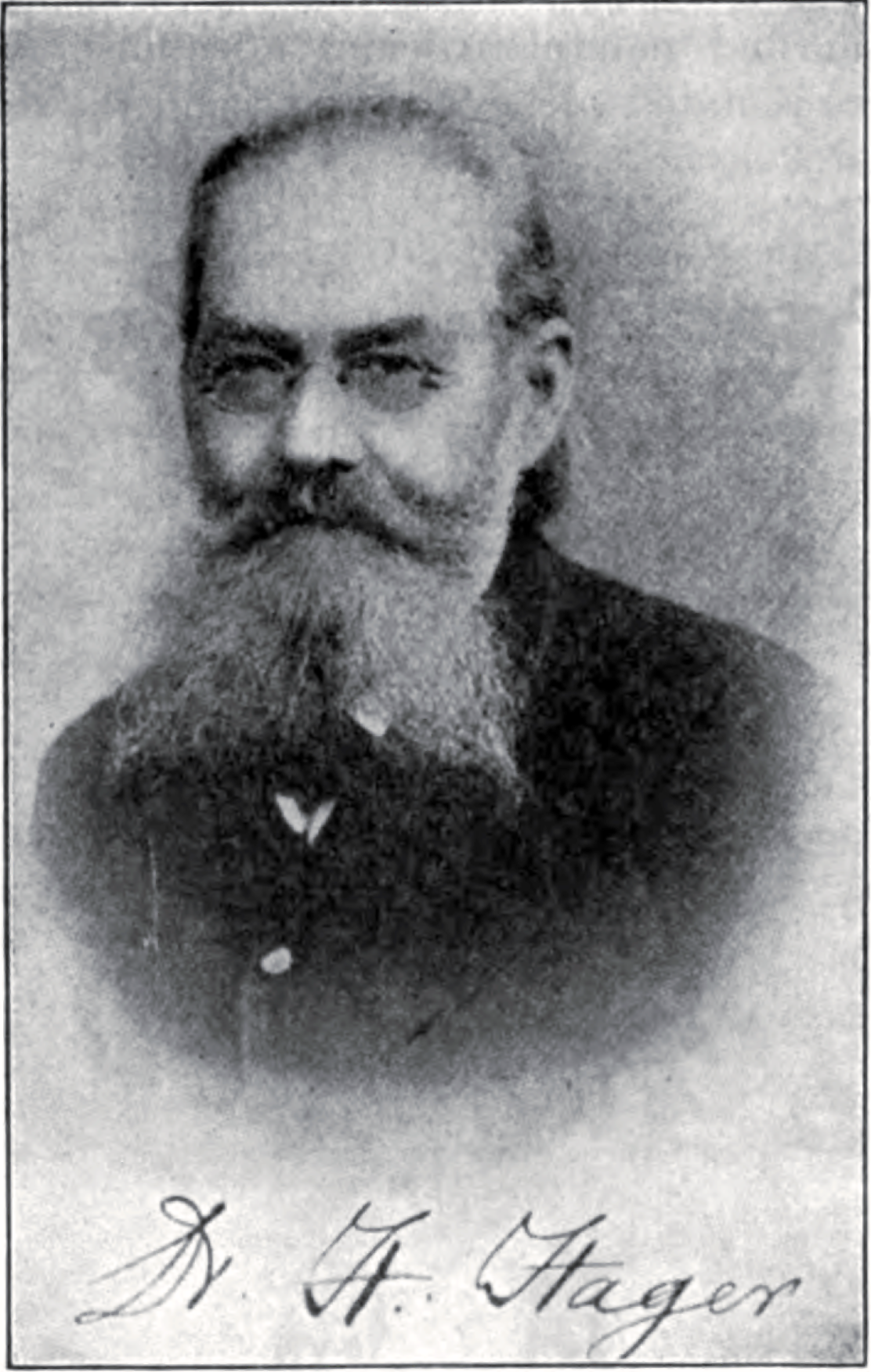

Hans Hermann Julius Hager (3 January 1816 – 24 January 1897) was a German writer on pharmacy.

== Biography ==
He was born at Berlin. Both as editor of the Pharmazeutische Centralhalle at Berlin and as an author he did much to advance pharmaceutical science. His exposition and published analyses of secret remedies were especially valuable.

== Works ==
- Hager, Hermann (1861). Medicamenta homoeopathica et isopathica omnia. Lesnae. (in Latin)
- Das Mikroskop und seine Anwendung : ein Leitfaden bei mikroskopischen Untersuchungen für Beamte der Sanitäts-Polizei, Aerzte, Apotheker, Schullehrer etc. . Springer, Berlin 1866 Digital edition by the University and State Library Düsseldorf
- Pharmacopoeae recentiores Anglica, Gallica, Germaniae, Helvetica, Russiae inter se collatae : Supplementum Manualis pharmaceutici Hageri . Günther, Vratislaviae 1869 Digital edition by the University and State Library Düsseldorf
- Technik der pharmaceutischen Receptur . Springer, Berlin 3rd ed. 1875 Digital edition / 4th ed. 1884 Digital edition by the University and State Library Düsseldorf
- Manuale Pharmaceuticum (“Manual of pharmacology,” vol. i., 6th ed. 1891; vol. ii., 3d ed. 1876) (Vol. primum 1861 Digital edition) (4th ed. 1875 Digital edition) (6th ed. 1892 Digital edition by the University and State Library Düsseldorf)
- Commentar zur Pharmacopoea Germanica : mit zahlreichen in den Text gedruckten Holzschnitten. Band 1 . Springer, Berlin 1873 Digital edition by the University and State Library Düsseldorf
- Commentar zur Pharmacopoea Germanica : mit zahlreichen in den Text gedruckten Holzschnitten. Band 2 . Springer, Berlin 1874 Digital edition by the University and State Library Düsseldorf
- Handbuch der pharmaceutischen Praxis : für Apotheker, Ärzte, Drogisten und Medicinalbeamte Bd. 1-2 . Springer, Berlin 1876 - 1884 Digital edition / 1900-1920 Digital edition by the University and State Library Düsseldorf
- Commentar zur Pharmacopoea Germanica : mit zahlreichen in den Text gedruckten Holzschnitten. Band 1 . Springer, Berlin Ed. altera 1883 Digital edition by the University and State Library Düsseldorf
- Commentar zur Pharmacopoea Germanica : mit zahlreichen in den Text gedruckten Holzschnitten. Band 2 . Springer, Berlin Editio II. 1884 Digital edition by the University and State Library Düsseldorf
- Erster Unterricht des Pharmaceuten . Band 1: Chemisch-pharmaceutischer Unterricht in 125 Lectionen . Springer, Berlin 4. Aufl. 1885 Digital edition by the University and State Library Düsseldorf
- Hagers Untersuchungen . Vol.1-2 . Günther, Leipzig 2nd ed. 1885-1888 Digital edition by the University and State Library Düsseldorf
- Das Mikroskop und seine Anwendung (“The microscope and its application,” 7th ed. 1886).
- Handbuch der pharmazeutischen Rezeptirkunst (“Handbook of prescriptions,” 5th ed. 1890)
- Kommentar zum Arzneibuch für das Deutsche Reich . Volume 1.3 - 3.3 Springer, Berlin 3rd ed. [Pharmacopoea Germanica, editio III] 1891 - 1895 Digital edition by the University and State Library Düsseldorf
