= Liesgau =

The Liesgau was a shire (Gau) of the Duchy of Saxony in the early medieval period, roughly corresponding to the former Osterode district of Lower Saxony. It was situated on the south-west side of the Harz Mountains in what is now the German state of Lower Saxony. Its southern bound was near the town of Duderstadt and its northern bound near Osterode, and its western bound near the River Leine. Its eastern boundary corresponds to the present-day eastern border of Lower Saxony.

The Liesgau is mentioned under the name Hlisgo in several documents from the 9th to 11th centuries. It was bordered by the following counties (list may be incomplete): Salzgau, Harzgau, Helmengau, Eichsfeld, Lochne, Suilberge. Its most important town was Pöhlde. In the 13th century, the Liesgau became part of the Duchy of Brunswick-Lüneburg, and later closely corresponded to the Grubenhagen subdivision of this duchy.
