= Salzwedel =

Town in Saxony-Anhalt, Germany

- Town
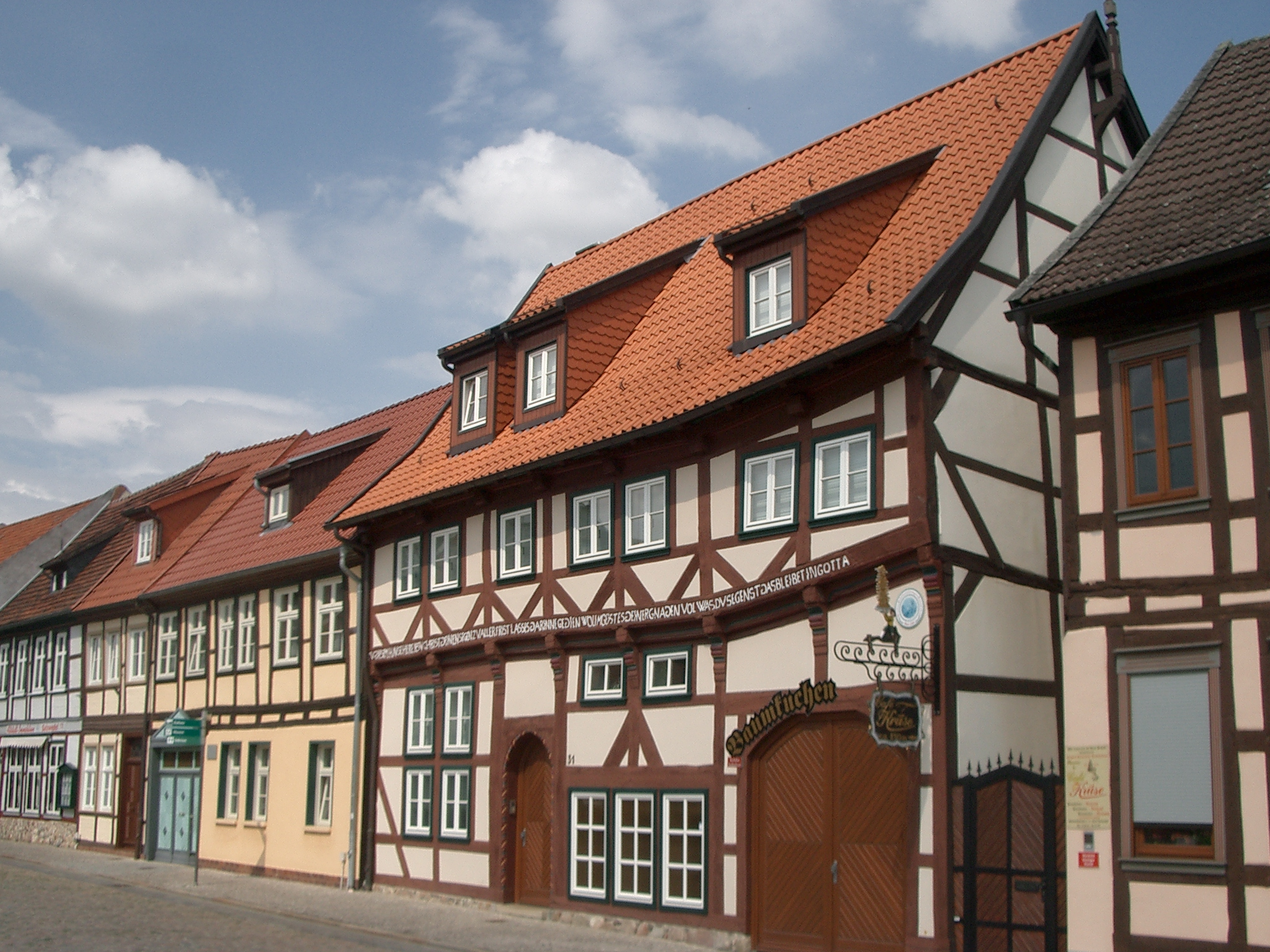
- Typical old housing in Salzwedel

- Flag Coat of arms

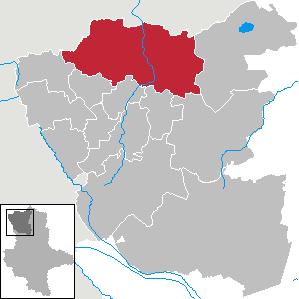
- Location of Salzwedel within Altmarkkreis Salzwedel district
- Interactive map of Salzwedel
- Location within Germany Location within Saxony-Anhalt
- Coordinates: 52°51′N 11°09′E
- Country: Germany
- State: Saxony-Anhalt
- District: Altmarkkreis Salzwedel

Government
  - Mayor (2022–29): Olaf Meining (SPD)

Area
  - Total: 304.58 km^{2} (117.60 sq mi)
- Elevation: 19 m (62 ft)

Population (2025-12-31)
  - Total: 22,924
  - Density: 75.264/km^{2} (194.93/sq mi)
- Time zone: UTC+01:00 (CET)
  - Summer (DST): UTC+02:00 (CEST)
- Postal codes: 29410, 29413, 29416
- Dialling codes: 03901, 039032, 039033, 039037, 039038
- Vehicle registration: SAW
- Website: www.salzwedel.de

Salzwedel (German pronunciation: [ˈzaltsveːdl̩], officially known as Hansestadt Salzwedel; Low German: Soltwedel) is a town in Saxony-Anhalt, in northern Germany. It is the capital of the district (Kreis) of Altmarkkreis Salzwedel, and has a population of approximately 21,500. Salzwedel is located on the German Timber-Frame Road.

== Geography ==
Salzwedel is situated at the river Jeetzel in the northwestern part of the Altmark. It is located between Hamburg and Magdeburg. Distances from Uelzen are 44 km (27 mi) east, 12 km (7 mi) south of Lüchow, 41 km (25 mi) north of Gardelegen and 24 km (15 mi) west of Arendsee. In 1968 test drillings revealed a significant reservoir of natural gas near the city.

=== Divisions ===
The town Salzwedel consists of Salzwedel proper and the following Ortschaften or municipal divisions:

- Andorf
- Barnebeck
- Brietz
- Chüden
- Dambeck
- Henningen
- Klein Gartz
- Langenapel
- Liesten
- Mahlsdorf
- Osterwohle
- Pretzier
- Riebau
- Seebenau
- Stappenbeck
- Steinitz
- Tylsen

== History ==
=== Early history ===
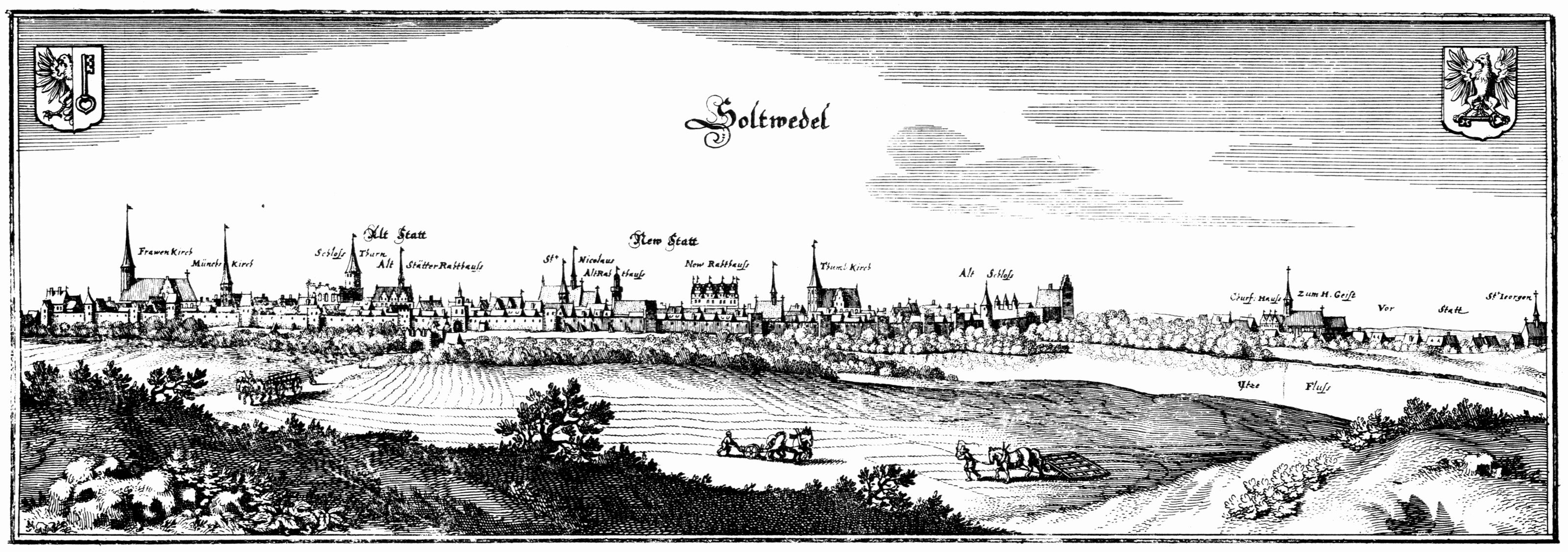
Salzwedel in 1652

The castle of Salzwedel in the Altmark was first documented in 1112. As part of the Margraviate of Brandenburg, the settlement was first mentioned as a town in 1233. To the northeast of the old town (Altstadt), a new town (Neustadt) began development in 1247. In the Middle Ages Salzwedel belonged to the Hanseatic League from 1263 to 1518. As to religion Salzwedel belonged to the Diocese of Verden (till 1648).

The city from 1247 began developing as a reestablishment from the old part of the town. In 1701 it became part of the Kingdom of Prussia. In 1713, the two towns Altstadt and Neustadt became one. Salzwedel became part of the Prussian Province of Saxony in 1815 after the Napoleonic Wars. In 1870 it received a railroad connection. The medieval part of the town remains the commercial and administrative center of the town until today.

=== Nazi rule and World War II ===
As in other German cities and towns during the time of Nazi Germany, the Jewish residents of the city were systematically deprived of their rights, then expelled from the city.

There was a forced labour camp for some 1,000 women, which in mid-1944 was converted into a subcamp of the Neuengamme concentration camp, which housed over 1,500 female prisoners, mostly Jewish, but also of other nationalities, particularly towards the end of the camp's existence, including Greek, Italian, Czech and Dutch. The guard staff at the camp included sixty SS men and women. One Aufseherin is known today by name, Lieselotte Darnstaedt, who was born in 1908. Darnstaedt also served at Ravensbrück before coming to Salzwedel. On April 14, 1945, the US Army liberated the Salzwedel women's subcamp, and also a men's camp nearby for male non-German political prisoners. They were shocked to find more than ninety corpses of women who had died of typhus, dysentery and malaria. Some women died after being liberated.

Salzwedel was hit by five air raids from 1942 to 1945, and more than 300 people lost their lives, especially on 22 February 1945. On 16 March 1945, the German-organised march of French prisoners of war from the Oflag II-B camp ended in Salzwedel, and then the French were transported by train to the Oflag VI-A camp. The US Army eventually turned over control of the city to the Soviet Red Army, causing Salzwedel to become part of the German Democratic Republic.

=== Recent period ===
On November 9, 1989, the East-West German border crossing near Salzwedel was opened, along with East–West border crossings in the rest of the country, allowing East Germans residing in Salzwedel and elsewhere to travel freely to West Germany for the first time since the building of the Berlin Wall. In 1990 Salzwedel received its first democratically elected city government.

The official name of the city was changed into Hansestadt Salzwedel on 1 April 2008, in reference to its history as a member of the Hanseatic League.

In January 2003 the town incorporated the former municipalities Brietz, Dambeck and Mahlsdorf, in January 2009 Benkendorf, in January 2010 Chüden, Klein Gartz, Langenapel, Liesten, Osterwohle, Pretzier, Riebau, Seebenau and Tylsen, and in January 2011 Steinitz and Wieblitz-Eversdorf.

== Demographics ==
Historical population

Year	Pop.	±%
1998	20,614	—
1999	20,499	−0.6%
2000	20,349	−0.7%
2001	20,130	−1.1%
2002	19,926	−1.0%
2003	21,360	+7.2%
2004	21,070	−1.4%
2005	21,316	+1.2%

Year	Pop.	±%
2006	20,777	−2.5%
2015	24,410	+17.5%
2016	24,199	−0.9%
2017	24,002	−0.8%
2018	23,655	−1.4%
2020	23,306	−1.5%
2021	22,999	−1.3%

== Mayors ==
Olaf Meining is the Mayor of Salzwedel since 2022. Since March 2016 Sabine Blümel is the Lord Mayor.

== Culture and sights ==
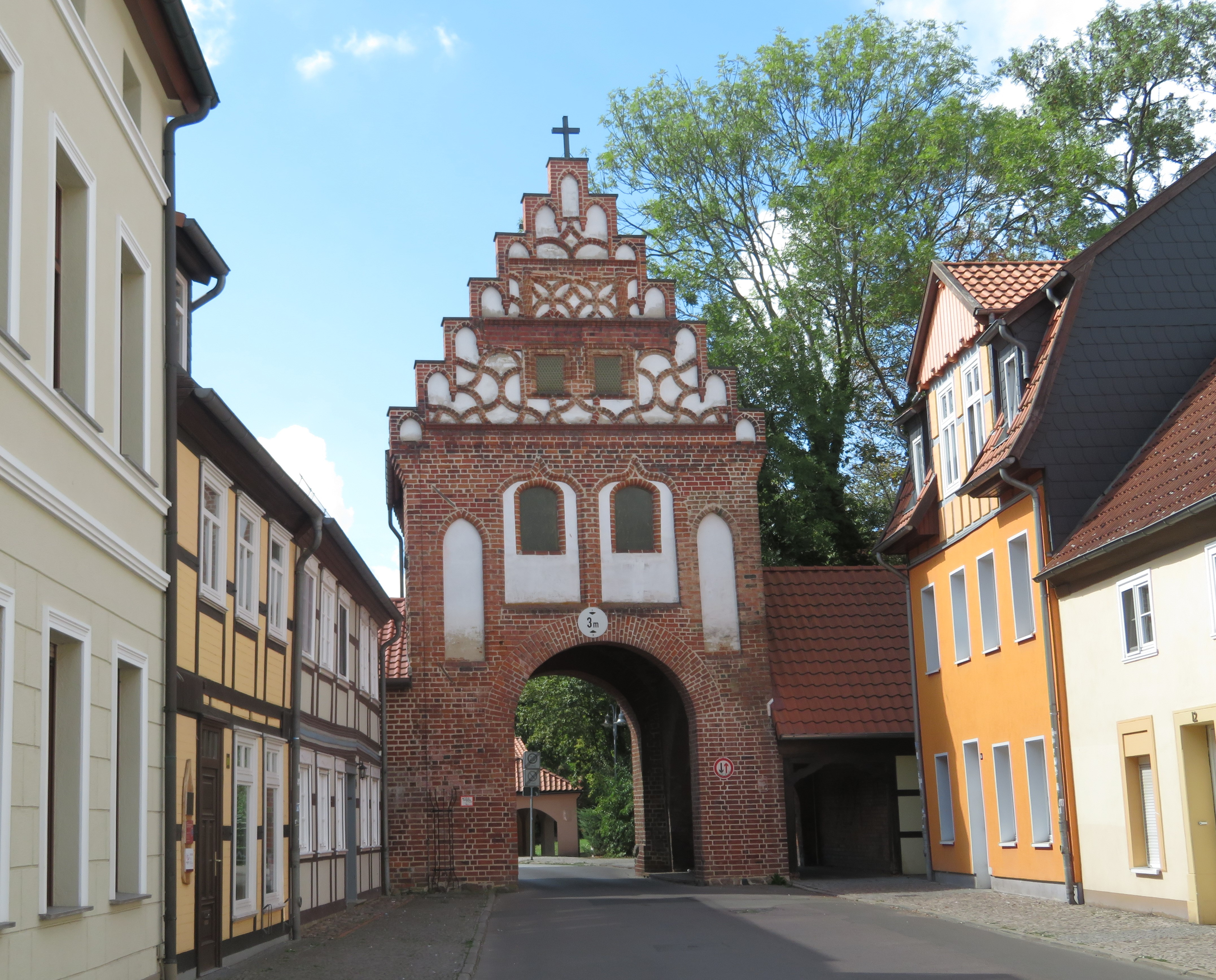
Gate Sandtor

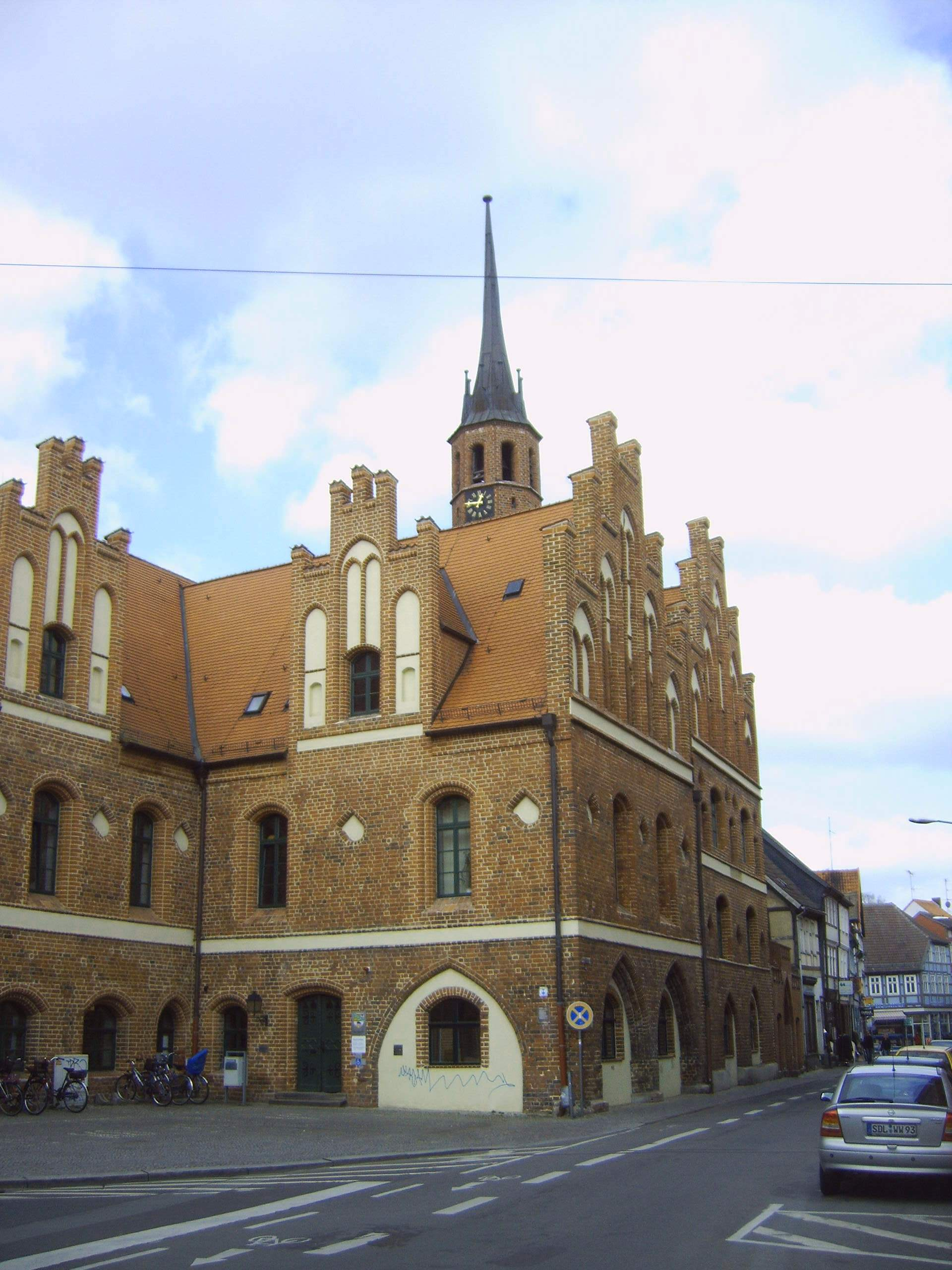
Local Court of Salzwedel

=== Main sights ===
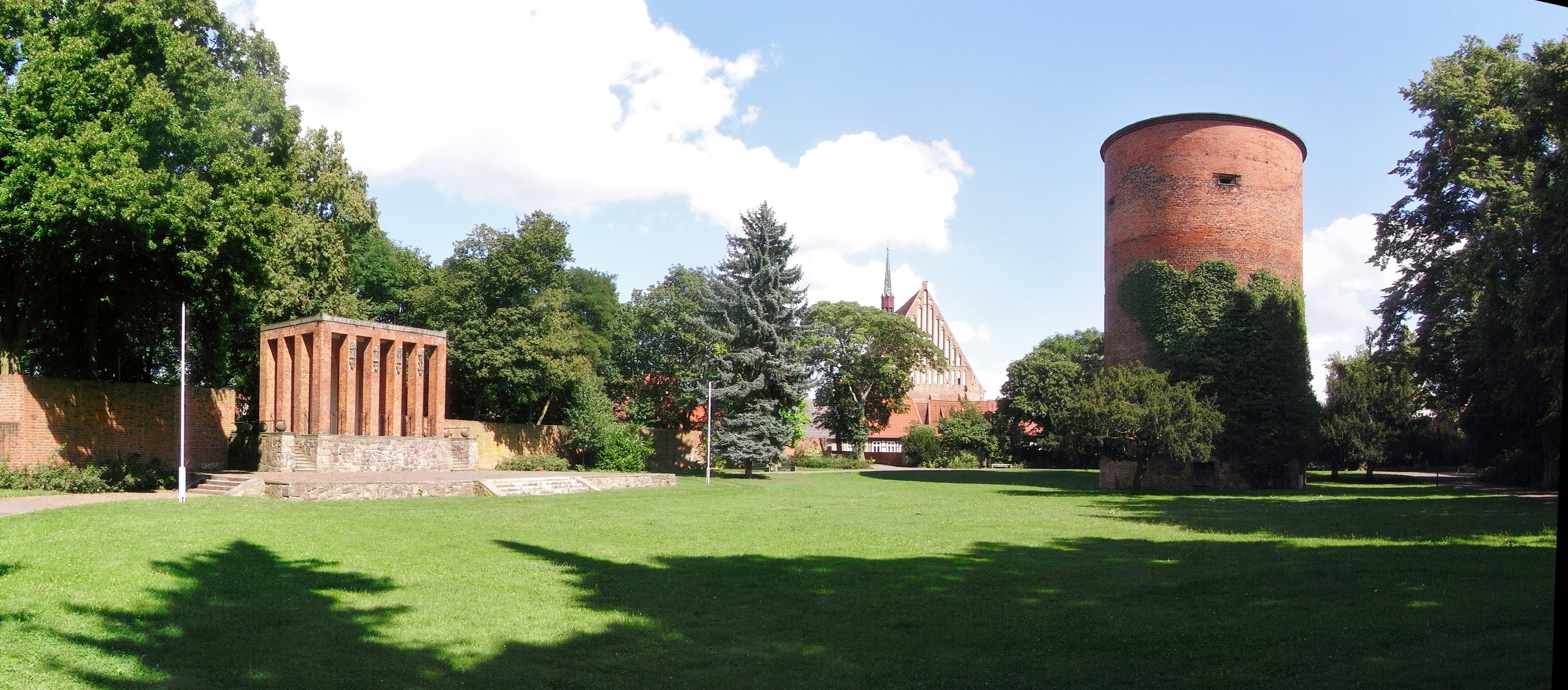
Castle garden in Salzwedel (World War I memorial, view on monastery church and tower)

Salzwedel's sites of interest include the historic part of town, encompassed by the historic city wall and town gates. The city also contains the birth house of Jenny von Westphalen, later the wife of Karl Marx.

- numerous half-timbered houses
- town gates: Neuperver Gate built 1460–1470, Stonegate built around 1530, and medieval city fortifications with Hungerturm Tower and the Kluhs, a store house dating from 1490 built on the wall
- remains of a castle (Castle Tower and Garden)
- Townhall (former monastery)
- Townhall Tower
- The Monk Church
- gothic Brickchurches St.Marien, St.Katharina und St.Lorenz
- another churches: St. Georg and Holy-Spirit-Church
- former Townhall, today's local court of Salzwedel
- Fairy-Tale Garden
- Johann-Friedrich-Danneil-Museum
- "Baumkuchen" Bakeries

=== Festivals ===
- Parkfestival, music event taking part in a 2-year-rhythm with the participation of national and international artists like Die Prinzen, Nina Hagen, Joe Cocker, Reamonn, Heather Nova, Leningrad Cowboys, Madsen, Blackmail, City and so on.
- Smack-Festival, one of the biggest Hard-Rock-Festivals in Saxony-Anhalt.

=== Cuisine ===
The delicacies of the town are Baumkuchen, Salzwedeler (Altmärker) Wedding-Soup and Tiegelbraten (mutton).

=== Institution ===
The Nicolaus Gercken Family Foundation is located in the city of Salzwedel.

== Transport ==
Salzwedel station is on the Stendal–Uelzen railway, part of the America Line (Amerikalinie), which was restored in the 1990s linking Berlin and Bremen. The line connects Stendal and Uelzen. Other stations are in Wittenberge near Arendsee and in Oebisfelde.

The train station ist also a waypoint on the cycling route Eurovelo EV13 Iron Curtain Trail that runs through the town.

Salzwedel is accessed via car by route 71 (north to south) and 248 (west to east). Access to the nearest autobahn is A39 which is 59 kilometres (37 miles) away in Wolfsburg, the A250 is 80.9 km (50.3 mi) away in Lüneburg, the A24 in Dreieck and the A241 is 81.4 km (50.6 mi) away.

== Notable people ==
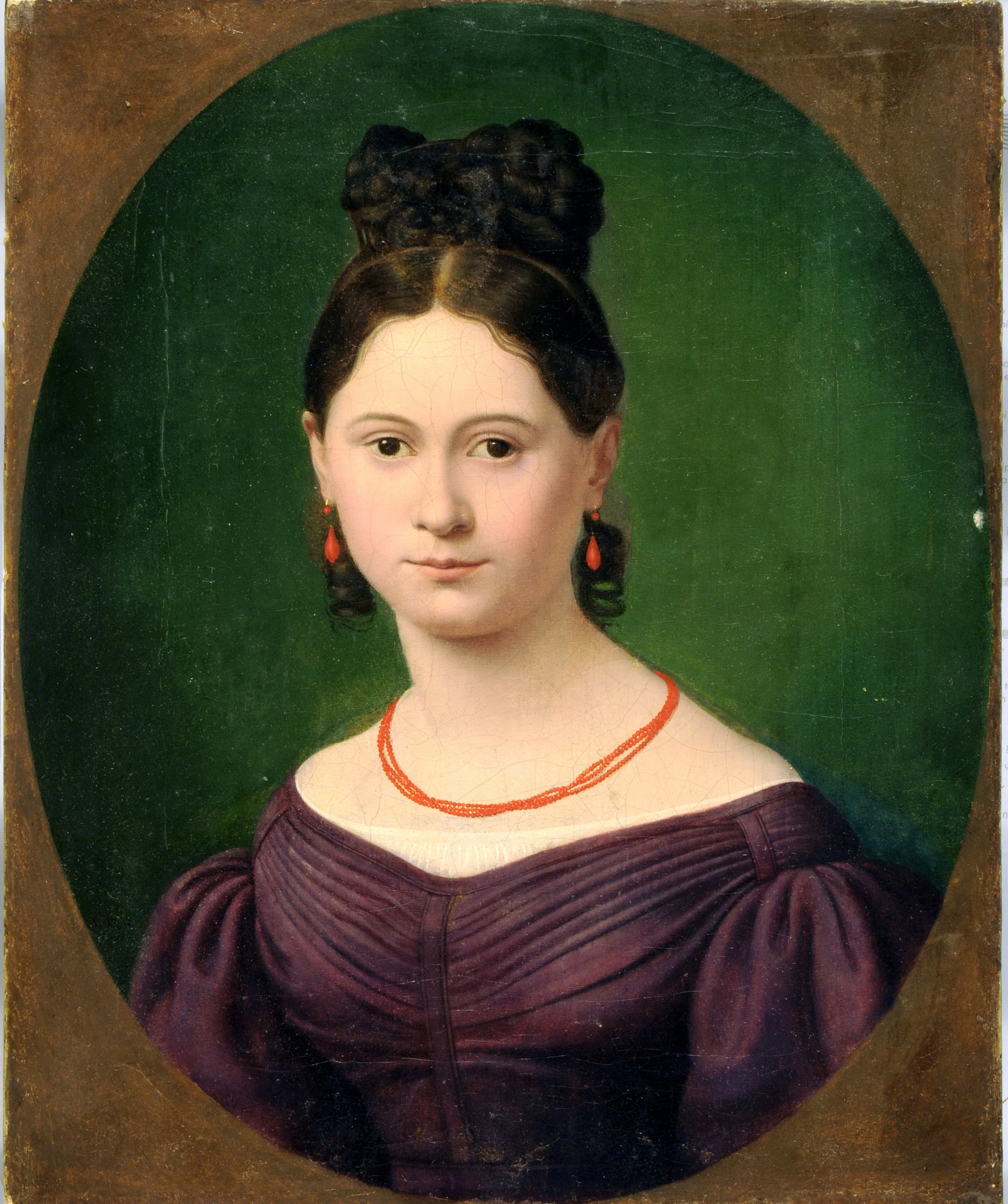
Jenny von Westphalen around 1830

- Balthasar Christian Bertram (died 1787), violinist and composer
- Heinz Billing (1914–2017), Freeman, a physicist and pioneer of computer development and in the exploration of gravitational waves
- Joerg Bleeck (born 1940), Entrepreneur, pioneered German limestone mining in US Washington state.
- Andy Böhme (born 1970), skeleton pilot
- Klaus Decker (born 1952), football player
- Doris Maletzki (born 1952), sprinter
- Friedrich Meinecke (1862–1954), historian
- Michel Niemeyer (born 1995), football player
- Stephan Praetorius (1536–1604), pastor
- Jürgen Scharf (born 1952), politician (CDU)
- Kurt Schütte (1909–1998), German mathematician
- Peter Urie (1955–2005), priest and bishop in the Republic of Kazakhstan
- Jenny von Westphalen (1814–1881), wife of Karl Marx
- Johann Walther (1563–1620), deacon and preacher at the Johanneskirche, Danzig
- Lorenz Weinrich (1929–2025), German historian

=== People associated with Salzwedel ===
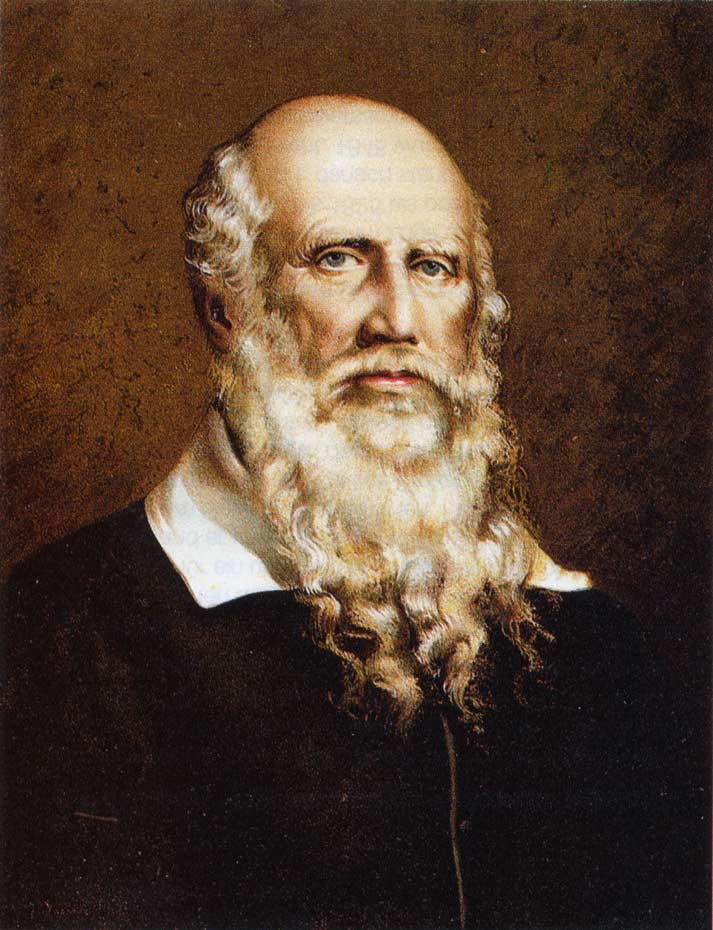
Friedrich Ludwig Jahn

- Wilhelm Harnisch (1787–1864), educator and writer, visited the school and described Salzwedel in My life Morning
- Hermann Hager (1816–1897), chemist and pharmacist, pharmacist teaching in Löwenapotheke
- Friedrich Ludwig Jahn (1778–1852), father of gymnastics, attended high school Salzwedel
- Reinhard Jirgl (born 1953), writer, lived from 1953 to 1964 with grandparents in Salzwedel
- Hermann Masius (1818–1893), educator, school teacher temporarily in Salzwedel
- Siegfried Schneider (born 1946), politician, mayor and city manager of Salzwedel
- Brooks Shane Salzwedel (born 1978), American artist descendant of Salzwedel, sharing the namesake

== International relations ==
Salzwedel is twinned with:

- Wesel, Germany, since 1990
- San Vito dei Normanni, Italy, since 1990
- Felixstowe, United Kingdom, since 1994
