= Osterwohle =

- Stadtteil of Salzwedel
- Interactive map of Osterwohle
- Location within Germany Location within Saxony-Anhalt
- Coordinates: 52°50′12″N 11°00′24″E
- Country: Germany
- State: Saxony-Anhalt
- District: Altmarkkreis Salzwedel
- Town: Salzwedel

Area
  - Total: 26.87 km^{2} (10.37 sq mi)
- Elevation: 28 m (92 ft)

Population (2006-12-31)
  - Total: 496
  - Density: 18.5/km^{2} (47.8/sq mi)
- Time zone: UTC+01:00 (CET)
  - Summer (DST): UTC+02:00 (CEST)
- Postal codes: 29413
- Dialling codes: 03901
- Vehicle registration: SAW

Osterwohle is a village and a former municipality in the district Altmarkkreis Salzwedel, in Saxony-Anhalt, Germany. Since 1 January 2010, it is part of the town Salzwedel.
