= Seebenau =

- Stadtteil of Salzwedel
- Interactive map of Seebenau
- Location within Germany Location within Saxony-Anhalt
- Coordinates: 52°53′24″N 11°01′48″E
- Country: Germany
- State: Saxony-Anhalt
- District: Altmarkkreis Salzwedel
- Town: Salzwedel

Area
  - Total: 26.92 km^{2} (10.39 sq mi)
- Elevation: 20 m (66 ft)

Population (2006-12-31)
  - Total: 658
  - Density: 24.4/km^{2} (63.3/sq mi)
- Time zone: UTC+01:00 (CET)
  - Summer (DST): UTC+02:00 (CEST)
- Postal codes: 29413
- Dialling codes: 03901
- Vehicle registration: SAW

Seebenau is a village and a former municipality in the district Altmarkkreis Salzwedel, in Saxony-Anhalt, Germany. Since 1 January 2010, it is part of the town Salzwedel.
