= Evessen =

- Municipality
- Coat of arms

- Location of Evessen within Wolfenbüttel district
- Interactive map of Evessen
- Location within Germany Location within Lower Saxony
- Coordinates: 52°11′25″N 10°42′36″E
- Country: Germany
- State: Lower Saxony
- District: Wolfenbüttel
- Municipal assoc.: Sickte

Government
  - Mayor: Klaus Bertram (SPD)

Area
  - Total: 17.55 km^{2} (6.78 sq mi)
- Elevation: 140 m (460 ft)

Population (2025-12-31)
  - Total: 1,220
  - Density: 69.5/km^{2} (180/sq mi)
- Time zone: UTC+01:00 (CET)
  - Summer (DST): UTC+02:00 (CEST)
- Postal codes: 38173
- Dialling codes: 05333
- Vehicle registration: WF
- Website: www.sickte.de

Evessen is a municipality in the district of Wolfenbüttel, in Lower Saxony, Germany.

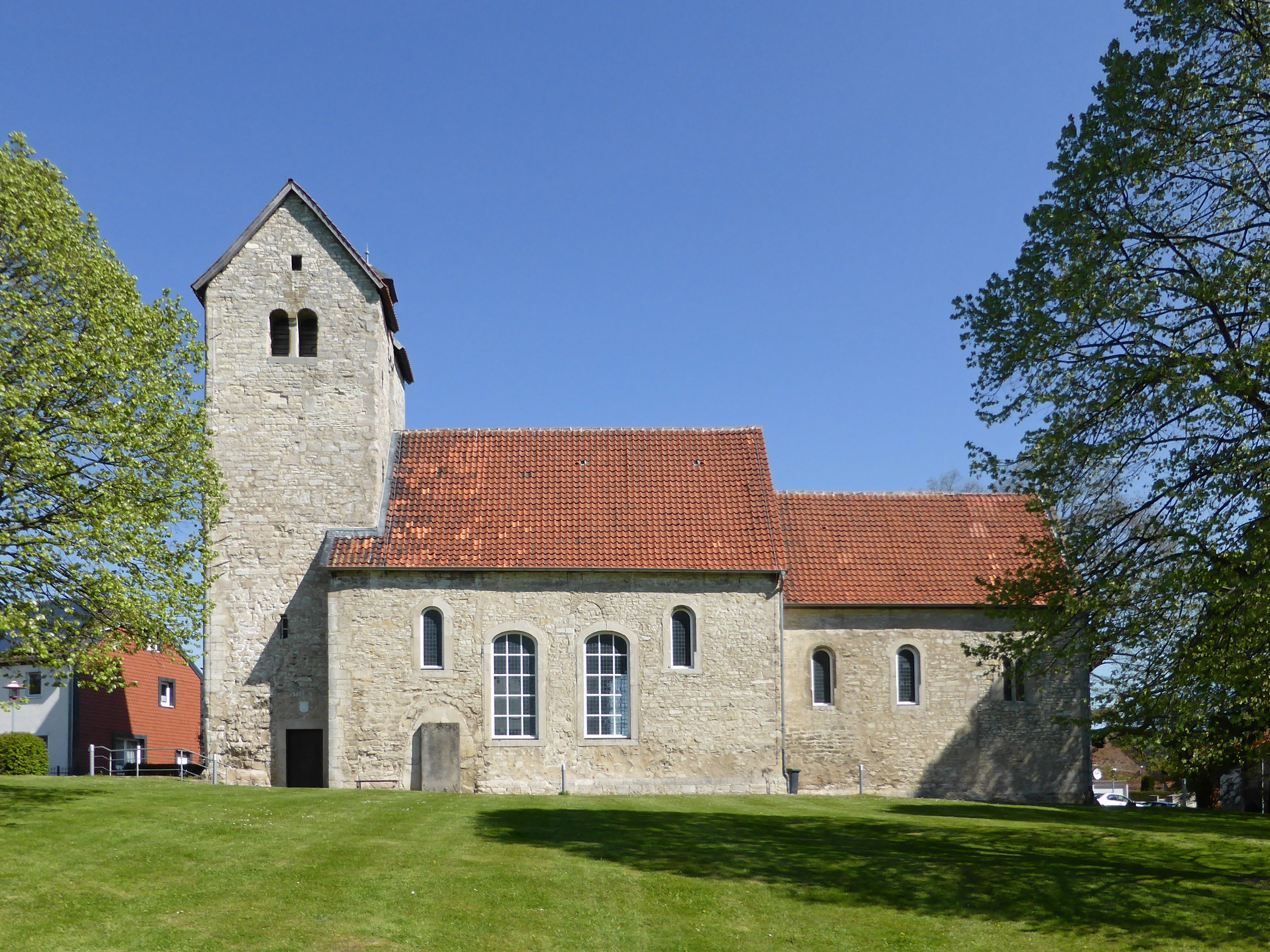
The Lutheran Church
