= Poeta Saxo =

Start of the Annales de gestis Caroli in a manuscript copied at the Priory of Corsendonk in 1494

The anonymous Saxon poet known as Poeta Saxo, who composed the medieval Latin Annales de gestis Caroli magni imperatoris libri quinque ("Annals of the Deeds of Emperor Charlemagne in Five Books"), was probably a monk of Saint Gall or possibly Corvey. His Annales is one of the earliest poetic treatments of annalistic material and one of the earliest historical works to concentrate on Saxony. It is considered characteristic of the dénouement of the Carolingian Renaissance.

The Saxon identity of the poet is implicit in only two places in the text of his poem, as when he refers to the Saxons as "our people" in lines 687–690. He probably began collecting oral tradition about Charlemagne (conqueror of the Saxons) in 883, but soon graduated to annalistic texts (e.g. the Annales regni Francorum as compiled under Einhard) and biographic works (e.g. Einhard's Vita Karoli Magni); he composed his poem between 888 and 891, during the reign of Arnulf of Carinthia, whom he addresses. The Poeta was steeped in classical poetry and schooled in rhetoric. The Annales gives evidence of his having access to now lost annals and he has been a source for historians, though most literary critics offer less praise, noting that the Poeta is a versifier who simply transformed prose annals into metric ones with little original contribution.

He "goes beyond received and conventional ideas", however, in portraying Charlemagne as superior to the Roman emperors, standing beside Constantine in Heaven, and famous as David (this idea came from Charlemagne's court nickname). In the final book, where the Poet depicts the nations on Judgement Day, he has each nation led by a different apostle: Peter leads the Jews and Paul leads the Gentiles, under whom Andrew leads the Greeks, John the Asians, Matthew the Ethiopians, Thomas the Indians, and Charlemagne the Saxons. The Poeta is among the saved Saxons who enter Christ's presence; it is for this reason that he overlooks the brutality of Charlemagne's conquest of his people, for with Charlemagne came Christian salvation.

A page from the earliest manuscript, copied at Lamspringe Abbey in the 11th century

Among the pieces of history for which only the Poeta is a source are the commendation of the Danish chieftain Halfdan to Charlemagne in 807 and the existence of vernacular Germanic poems and songs about Germanic heroes of the past. About the latter the Poeta writes: Est quoque iam notum: vulgaria carmina magnis / Laudibus eius avos et proavos celebrant, / Pippinos, Carolos, Hludowicos et Theodricos / Et Carlomannos Hlothariosque canunt ("As is well known, vernacular poems celebrate and praise / his grandfathers and great grandfathers; / of Pippin, Charles, Louis, and Theoderic / Carlomann and Lothar are their songs made"). The Poeta also refers to the people of Europe over whom the Romans did not hold sway, yet who are subjects of Charlemagne.

The identification of the Poeta with Agius of Corvey was refuted by Karl Strecker and more recently by H. F. Stiene. Rita Lejeune and Timothy Reuter see the Annales as the predecessor of French epic poetry and romance. The Poeta was probably a source for Widukind of Corvey.

Of the five books of the 2,691-line Annales, the first four are in hexameters while the last is in elegiac distichs. The first critical edition of the Poeta's poem was G. H. Pertz, MGH SS, II (Hanover, 1829), which was replaced by an updated version by Paul von Winterfeld in the Poetarum Latinorum Medii Aevi Tomus IV, i (Berlin, 1909). Parts of books I and II appeared in Godman (1985) with English translation. A complete English prose translation appears in McKinney (1956).

== Latin text ==
Paul von Winterfeld, ed., in Poetarum Latinorum Medii Aevi Tomus IVi in Monumenta Germaniae Historica, (Berlin, 1909)
