= Altmark =

Historic region in Saxony-Anhalt, Germany

Coordinates: 52°43′N 11°24′E

See German tanker Altmark for the ship named after Altmark and Stary Targ for the Polish village named Altmark in German.

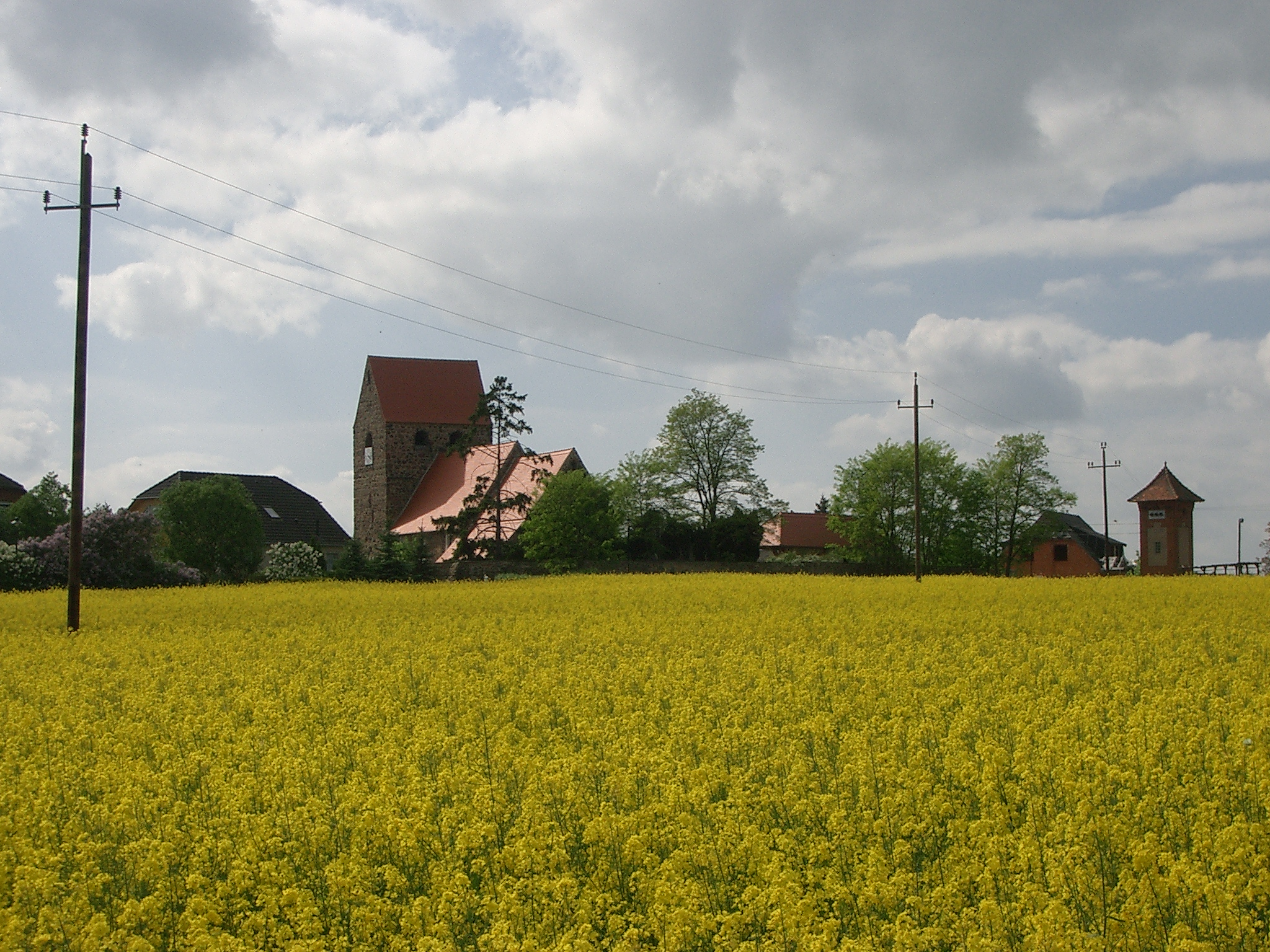
Altmark at Schernikau

The Altmark (German pronunciation: [ˈaltˌmaʁk]; English: Old March) is a historic region in Germany, comprising the northern third of Saxony-Anhalt. As the initial territory of the Margraviate of Brandenburg, it is sometimes referred to as the "Cradle of Prussia", as by Otto von Bismarck, a native of Schönhausen near Stendal.

== Geography ==
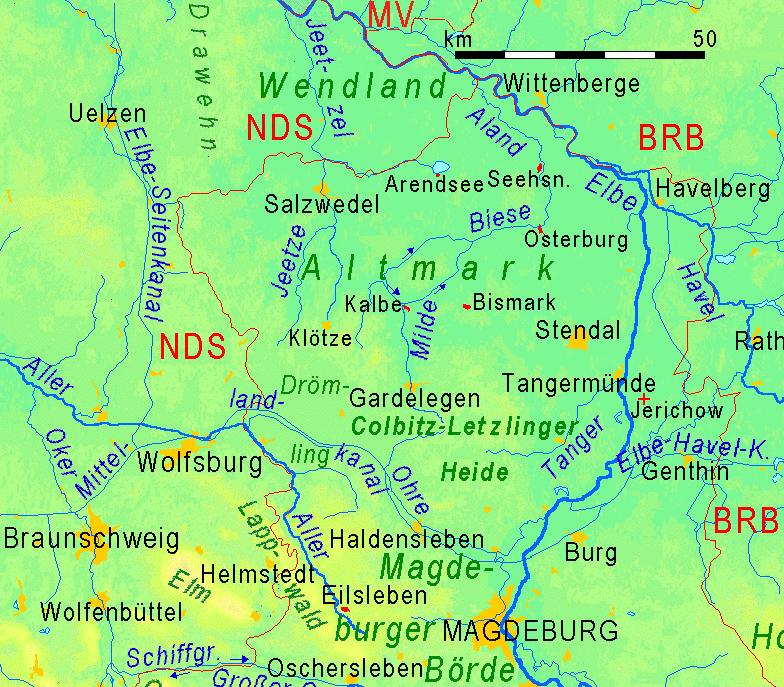
Topography of the Altmark

The Altmark is located west of the Elbe river between the cities of Hamburg and Magdeburg, mostly included in the present-day districts of Altmarkkreis Salzwedel and Stendal. In the west, the Drawehn hill range and the Drömling depression separate it from the Lüneburg Heath in Lower Saxony; the Altmark also borders the Wendland region in the north and the Magdeburg Börde in the south. Adjacent east of the Elbe is the historical Prignitz region.

The population is small. The cultural landscape within the North European Plain is rural and widely covered with forests and heathlands. The largest towns are Stendal, with a population of 39,000, and Salzwedel (21,500).

== History ==
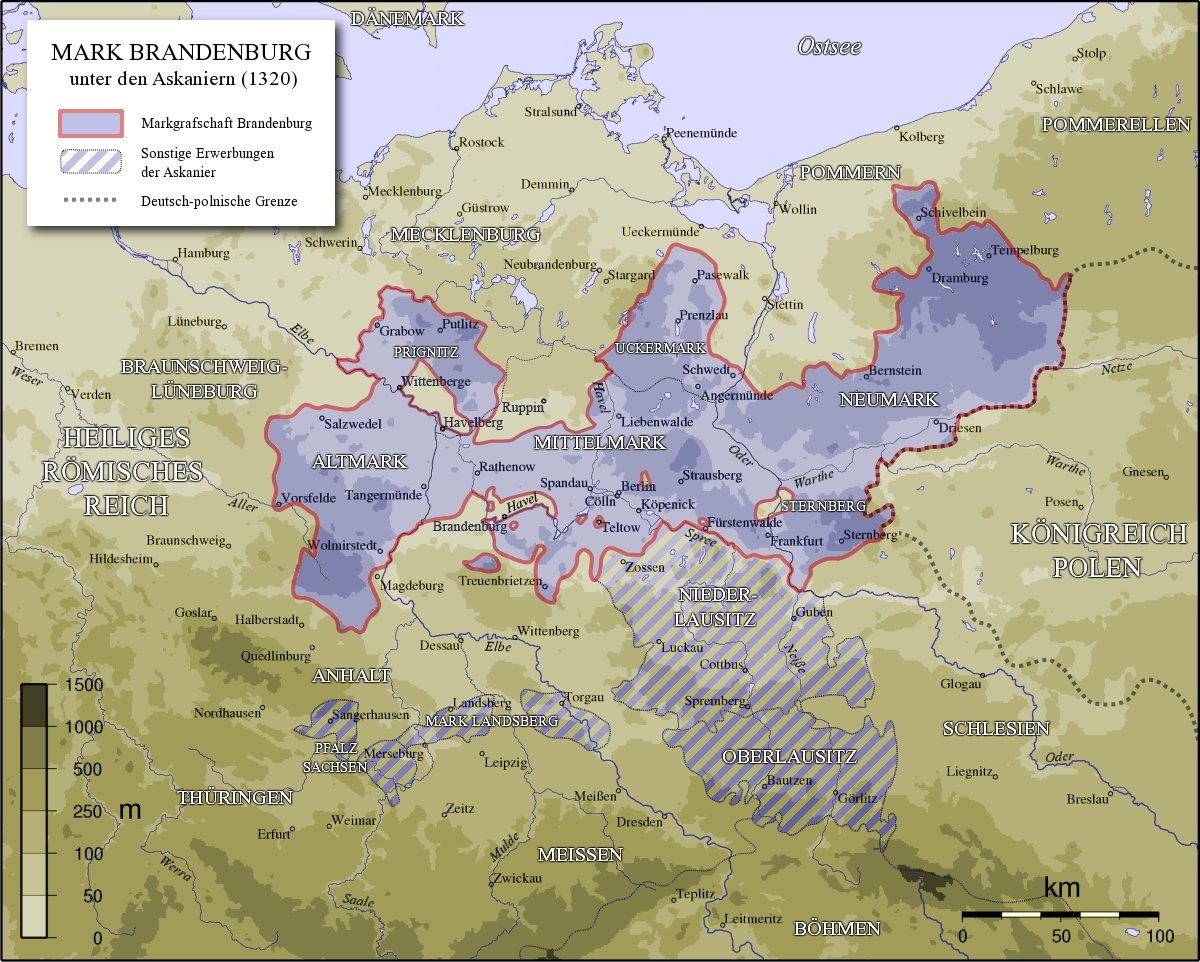
Altmark within the lands of Ascanians, 1320

Map of the Altmark (c. 1725)

Before the Migration Period, the Old Germanic Lombards had settled the future Altmark, but later migrated towards the southeast, resettling in Pannonia by the first half of the 6th century. Subsequently, the Germanic Saxon tribes expanded their territory by integrating northwestern regions into the Old Saxony, while Polabian Slavic tribe of Drevani settled in the northeastern territories along the Elbe river.

During the Saxon Wars (772-804), the Old Saxony became integrated into the Carolingian Empire. In the same time, the eastern Saxon region, known as Eastphalia, was entrusted by Charlemagne to Odo, an imperial legate (Latin: Odo legatus imperatoris) under whose command was the frontier fortress of Höhbeck on Elba, that was temporarily captured by the neighboring Slavic Wilzi in 810, but was soon retaken by Franks in 811, and already by 822 the region of Arendsee in Altmark was considered as integral part of Eastphalia (Eastern Saxony), bordering the Slavs (Sorbian March).

From 843 onwards, the Duchy of Saxony with its frontier regions on the Elbe river constituted the eastern borderland of East Francia, under king Louis the German and his successors. The bishops of Verden and of Halberstadt promoted the Christianisation of the Saxon population.

Subjugation of Drevani and other Slavic tribes along the Elbe river was intensified during the 10th century. German king Otto I (936-973) allotted Eastphalian frontier regions (including the later Altmark) to the Saxon Count Gero, in order to subdue the Slavic tribes along the Elbe. Gero thereafter campaigned in the Slavic lands far beyond the river Elbe, and established the march (known in historiography as the March of Gero), that was expanding towards the river Oder in the east. Upon Gero's death in 965, his march was split, and its northern part (known as the Northern March) was entrusted to count Thiadricus (Dietrich of Haldensleben). As a margrave, he was tasked to defend the northeastern Eastphalian regions, including Altmark, and was placed in charge over the pacification of neighboring Slavic tribes over the Elbe river, such as Redarians and Hevellians.

Dietrich turned out to be an unsuccessful margrave, and lost all the territories east of the Elbe in the Slavic Slavic uprising of 983. He retained his margravial title and the initial land basis of his predecessor Gero's conquests west of the river Elbe. The question of whether the region of later Altmark was included directly and to what extent into Gero's and Dietrich's frontier jurisdictions is debated among scholars.

For more than one and a half centuries, the lands east of the Elbe defied German control, until in 1134 Emperor Lothair of Supplinburg bestowed the Northern March on the Ascanian count Albert the Bear. Albert signed an inheritance contract with the Slavic Hevelli prince Pribislav and in 1150 succeeded him in his eastern territory around the fortress of Brandenburg an der Havel, which became the nucleus of his newly established Margraviate of Brandenburg in 1157.

As the Brandenburg margraves expanded their territory during the course of the Ostsiedlung, the original western territory of the Northern March became known as the Altmark (literally "Old March") in contrast to the Mittelmark (Middle March) and Neumark (New March) beyond the Oder river; the written record first mentions it in 1304 as Antiqua Marchia.

As part of Brandenburg, from 1415 held by the House of Hohenzollern, the Altmark became part of Brandenburg-Prussia and (from 1701) of the Kingdom of Prussia. After Prussia's defeat at the hands of Napoleon in 1806, the terms of the Treaty of Tilsit (1807) assigned the territory of the Altmark to the new Kingdom of Westphalia. Prussia regained the area upon Napoleon's defeat (per Article XXIII of the Final Act of the Congress of Vienna, 1815); however, it was incorporated into the new Prussian Province of Saxony rather than being attached to the Province of Brandenburg. Within Prussian Saxony, the Altmark was subdivided into the districts of Salzwedel, Gardelegen, Osterburg, and Stendal, all administered within the Regierungsbezirk of Magdeburg.

After World War II the Altmark, lying to the east of the inner German border, became part of the new state of Saxony-Anhalt in the Soviet occupation zone. The regional administration of East Germany saw it administered within Bezirk Magdeburg from 1952 to 1990. With German reunification in 1990, the Altmark became part of a reconstituted Saxony-Anhalt.

== Rivers and lakes ==
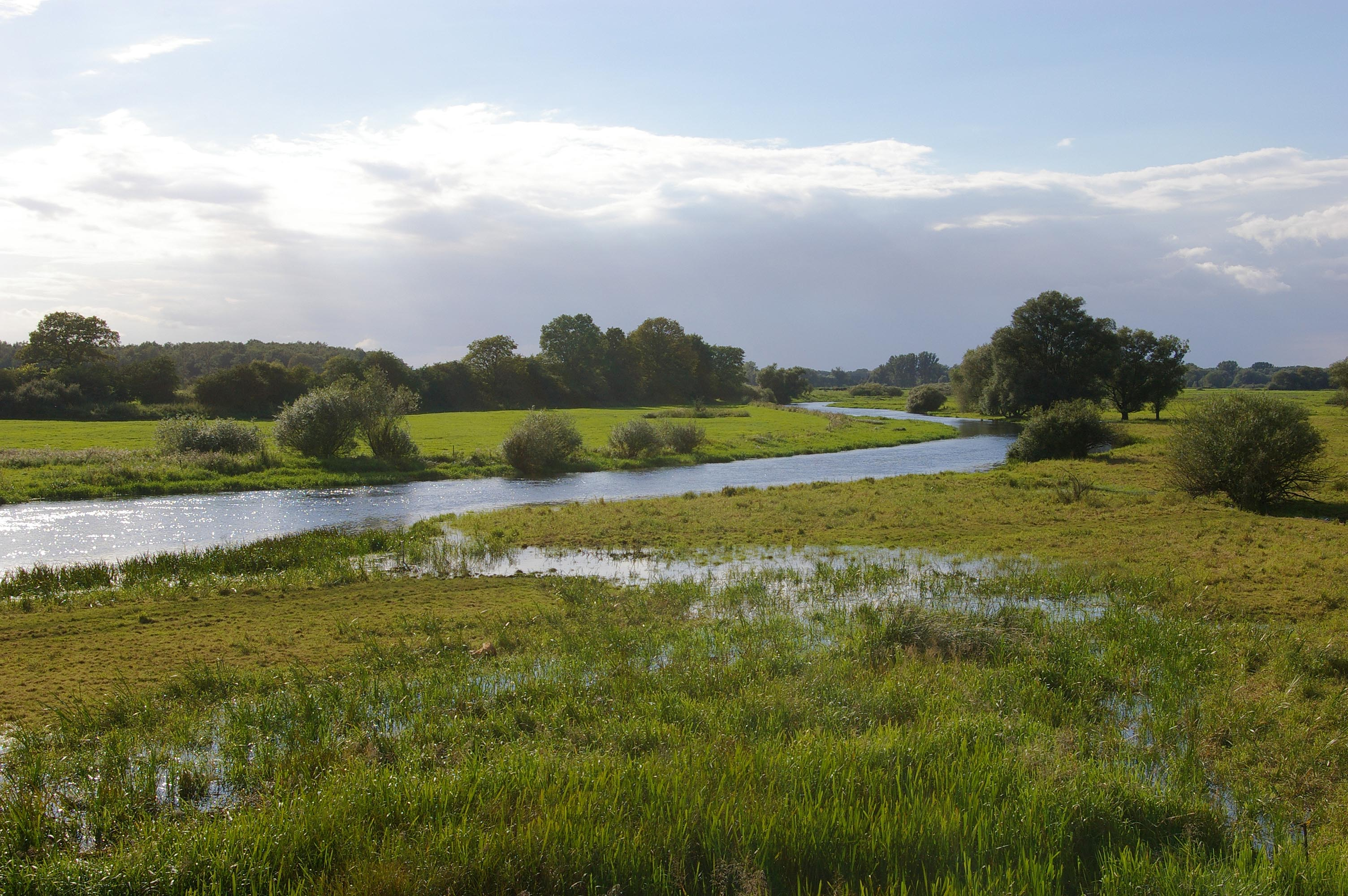
Aland floodplain near Wanzer

The region is drained by the Elbe, joined by the Havel at Havelberg, and its left tributaries of the Milde-Biese-Aland system and the Jeetzel river.

The largest natural lake of the Altmark is the Arendsee.

== Transport ==
=== Road ===
The Altmark is located off the main traffic routes. The Bundesautobahn 14 leads to the Bundesautobahn 2 from Hanover to Berlin, it however ends north of Magdeburg. A continuation through the Altmark towards Schwerin is planned. Beside which the Federal roads B71, B107, B188, B189, B190, B248 run through the region.

=== Rail ===
Stendal station is a stop on the Hanover–Berlin high-speed railway. Other lines include:

- Stendal–Salzwedel–Uelzen
- Wittenberge–Salzwedel–Oebisfelde (closed)
- Magdeburg–Stendal–Wittenberge
- Bismark–Kalbe (Milde) (closed)
- Stendal–Tangermünde

== Towns ==
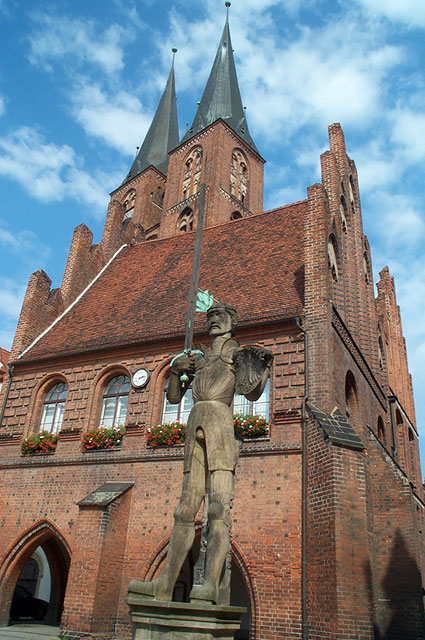
Roland statue at Stendal

- Salzwedel
- Oebisfelde
- Arendsee
- Seehausen
- Diesdorf
- Beetzendorf
- Klötze
- Mieste
- Gardelegen
- Kalbe (Milde)
- Bismark
- Osterburg
- Stendal
- Havelberg
- Tangermünde
- Tangerhütte
- Uchtspringe

== Culture ==
In 2025, the Altmark received international attention with the feature film “Sound of Falling" (German: In die Sonne schauen, lit. 'Looking at the sun') by Mascha Schilinski. The German drama follows four generations of girls connected by a farm in the Altmark. The film had its world premiere in the main competition of the 78th Cannes Film Festival on 14 May 2025, where it won the Jury Prize.

== Resources ==
One of Europe's largest lithium deposits was discovered in Altmark in 2025. The find, announced by Neptune Energy, is estimated at around 43 million tons of lithium carbonate equivalent and has the potential to transform the region into a key hub for Europe's electric vehicle and battery industries.

== Sources ==
- Althoff, Gerd (1999). "Saxony and the Elbe Slavs in the Tenth Century". The New Cambridge Medieval History. Vol. 3. Cambridge: Cambridge University Press. pp. 267–292.
- Bachrach, David S. (2012). Warfare in Tenth-Century Germany. Woodbridge: The Boydell Press.
- Hardt, Matthias (2001). "Hesse, Elbe, Saale and the Frontiers of the Carolingian empire". The Transformation of Frontiers: From Late Antiquity to the Carolingians. Leiden: Brill. pp. 219–232.
- Scholz, Bernhard Walter; Rogers, Barbara, eds. (1970). Carolingian Chronicles: Royal Frankish Annals and Nithard's Histories. Ann Arbor: University of Michigan Press.
- Stieldorf, Andrea (2026) [2012]. Marken und Markgrafen: Studien zur Grenzsicherung durch die fränkisch-deutschen Herrscher (2nd ed.). Wiesbaden: Harrassowitz Verlag.
