= Südliche Altmark =

Coordinates: 52°38′N 11°09′E

Südliche Altmark was a Verwaltungsgemeinschaft ("collective municipality") in the Altmarkkreis Salzwedel (district), in Saxony-Anhalt, Germany. It was situated around Gardelegen, which was the seat of the Verwaltungsgemeinschaft, but not part of it. It was disbanded in January 2011, when all member municipalities merged into the town of Gardelegen.

The Verwaltungsgemeinschaft Südliche Altmark consisted of the following municipalities:

1. Breitenfeld
2. Dannefeld
3. Estedt
4. Hottendorf
5. Jävenitz
6. Jeggau
7. Jerchel
8. Kassieck
9. Köckte
10. Letzlingen
11. Lindstedt
12. Mieste
13. Miesterhorst
14. Peckfitz
15. Sachau
16. Seethen
17. Sichau
18. Solpke
