= Gardelegen Stadt =

Coordinates: 52.667°N 11.183°E

Gardelegen Stadt was a Verwaltungsgemeinschaft ("municipal federation") in the Altmarkkreis Salzwedel (district), in Saxony-Anhalt, Germany. It was disbanded in July 2009. The seat of the Verwaltungsgemeinschaft was in Gardelegen.

The Verwaltungsgemeinschaft Gardelegen Stadt consisted of the following municipalities (population in 2005 between brackets):

- Berge (730)
- Gardelegen (11,740)
- Hemstedt (306)
- Kloster Neuendorf (531)
