= Carl Hahn (disambiguation) =

Carl Hahn (1926–2023) was the chairman of the Volkswagen Group (1982–1993).

Carl Hahn may also refer to:

- Carl Hugo Hahn (1818–1895), German missionary and linguist
- Carl Wilhelm Hahn (1786–1835), German zoologist
- Carl Wilhelm Hahn (journalist) (1898–1982), German journalist, historian and archivist
- Carl William Hahn (1829–1887), German painter
