= Algenstedt =

- Stadtteil of Gardelegen
- Interactive map of Algenstedt
- Location within Germany Location within Saxony-Anhalt
- Coordinates: 52°35′51″N 11°26′29″E
- Country: Germany
- State: Saxony-Anhalt
- District: Altmarkkreis Salzwedel
- Town: Gardelegen

Area
  - Total: 9.82 km^{2} (3.79 sq mi)
- Elevation: 38 m (125 ft)

Population (2006-12-31)
  - Total: 216
  - Density: 22.0/km^{2} (57.0/sq mi)
- Time zone: UTC+01:00 (CET)
  - Summer (DST): UTC+02:00 (CEST)
- Postal codes: 39638
- Dialling codes: 03907
- Vehicle registration: SAW

Algenstedt (German pronunciation: [ˈalɡn̩ˌʃtɛt]) is a village and a former municipality in the district Altmarkkreis Salzwedel, in Saxony-Anhalt, Germany. Since 1 July 2009, it is part of the town Gardelegen.
