= Roxförde =

- Stadtteil of Gardelegen
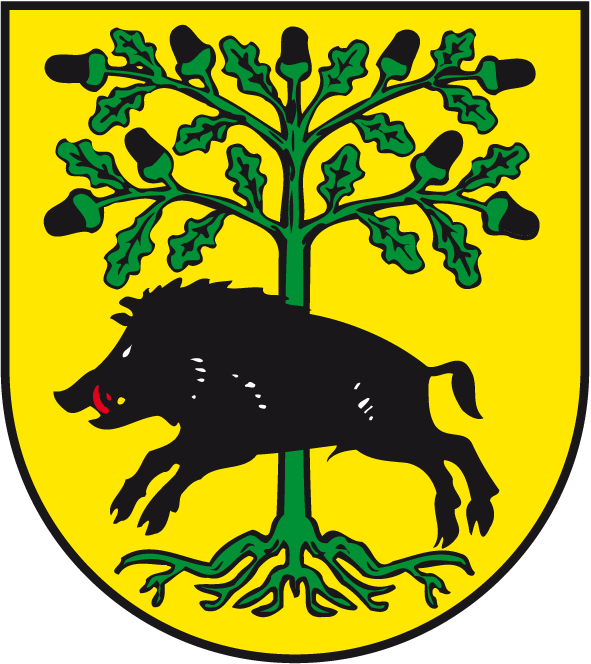
- Coat of arms
- Interactive map of Roxförde
- Location within Germany Location within Saxony-Anhalt
- Coordinates: 52°43′36″N 10°57′12″E
- Country: Germany
- State: Saxony-Anhalt
- District: Altmarkkreis Salzwedel
- Town: Gardelegen

Area
  - Total: 15.61 km^{2} (6.03 sq mi)
- Elevation: 67 m (220 ft)

Population (2006-12-31)
  - Total: 222
  - Density: 14.2/km^{2} (36.8/sq mi)
- Time zone: UTC+01:00 (CET)
  - Summer (DST): UTC+02:00 (CEST)
- Postal codes: 39638
- Dialling codes: 039056
- Vehicle registration: SAW

Roxförde (German pronunciation: [ʁɔksˈføːɐ̯də]) is a village and a former municipality in the district Altmarkkreis Salzwedel, in Saxony-Anhalt, Germany.

Since 1 January 2010, it is part of the town Gardelegen.
