= Schenkenhorst =

- Stadtteil of Gardelegen
- Interactive map of Schenkenhorst
- Location within Germany Location within Saxony-Anhalt
- Coordinates: 52°36′00″N 11°23′49″E
- Country: Germany
- State: Saxony-Anhalt
- District: Altmarkkreis Salzwedel
- Town: Gardelegen

Area
  - Total: 7.37 km^{2} (2.85 sq mi)
- Elevation: 32 m (105 ft)

Population (2006-12-31)
  - Total: 180
  - Density: 24/km^{2} (63/sq mi)
- Time zone: UTC+01:00 (CET)
  - Summer (DST): UTC+02:00 (CEST)
- Postal codes: 39638
- Dialling codes: 039080
- Vehicle registration: SAW

Schenkenhorst (German pronunciation: [ˈʃɛŋkn̩ˌhɔʁst]) is a village and a former municipality in the district Altmarkkreis Salzwedel, in Saxony-Anhalt, Germany. Since 1 July 2009, it is part of the town Gardelegen.
