= Zichtau =

- Stadtteil of Gardelegen
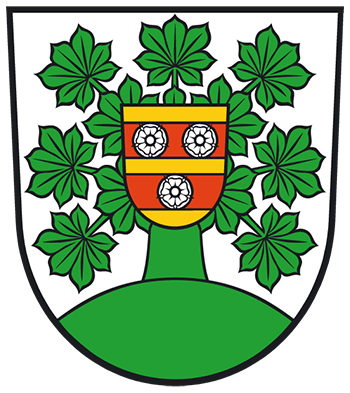
- Coat of arms
- Interactive map of Zichtau
- Location within Germany Location within Saxony-Anhalt
- Coordinates: 52°36′25″N 11°17′55″E
- Country: Germany
- State: Saxony-Anhalt
- District: Altmarkkreis Salzwedel
- Town: Gardelegen

Area
  - Total: 23.41 km^{2} (9.04 sq mi)
- Elevation: 68 m (223 ft)

Population (2006-12-31)
  - Total: 272
  - Density: 11.6/km^{2} (30.1/sq mi)
- Time zone: UTC+01:00 (CET)
  - Summer (DST): UTC+02:00 (CEST)
- Postal codes: 39638
- Dialling codes: 039085
- Vehicle registration: SAW

Zichtau (German pronunciation: [ˈtsɪçtaʊ]) is a village and a former municipality in the district Altmarkkreis Salzwedel, in Saxony-Anhalt, Germany.

Since 1 January 2010, it had become part of the town Gardelegen.
