= Wiepke =

- Stadtteil of Gardelegen
- Interactive map of Wiepke
- Location within Germany Location within Saxony-Anhalt
- Coordinates: 52°35′58″N 11°19′48″E
- Country: Germany
- State: Saxony-Anhalt
- District: Altmarkkreis Salzwedel
- Town: Gardelegen

Area
  - Total: 6.03 km^{2} (2.33 sq mi)
- Elevation: 37 m (121 ft)

Population (2006-12-31)
  - Total: 224
  - Density: 37.1/km^{2} (96.2/sq mi)
- Time zone: UTC+01:00 (CET)
  - Summer (DST): UTC+02:00 (CEST)
- Postal codes: 39638
- Dialling codes: 039085
- Vehicle registration: SAW

Wiepke (German pronunciation: [ˈviːpkə]) is a village and a former municipality in the district Altmarkkreis Salzwedel, in Saxony-Anhalt, Germany.

Since 1 January 2010, it is part of the town Gardelegen.
