= Canburg =

In 805 Charlemagne issued a fourth ban on the export of weapons to the Slavs. According to Moissac Chronicle Charlemagne's son Charles laid siege to "Canburg" (somewhere on the Elbe in Bohemia). Nobody knows where exactly Canburg was situated. The chronicle writes about the left bank of the Elbe river, but the author could easily muddle it up with other rivers in the area (e.g. Vltava – Moldau, Ohře – Eger). Lingual similarity is the cause of a hypothesis that Canburg was situated somewhere nearby the present-day town of Kadaň. Some historians mention as a possible site a fortified settlement in Divoká Šárka.

== Siege of Canburg ==
Siege of Canburg
- Part of Charles the Younger campaign into Bohemia
Date	805
Location	Unknown (possibly near Kadaň or Divoká Šárka
Result	Bohemian victory
Territorial changes	Frankish forces repulsed from hillfort

Belligerents
Bohemians	Carolingian Empire

Commanders and leaders
Lech †	Charles the Younger

Strength
Unknown, but less than Franks	Per Petr Juřina: 30,000–40,000

In 788, the Frankish king Charlemagne established a Czech mark, i.e. a military border area, in northern Bavaria. After the overthrow of the Avar empire between 791 and 803, the expansion of the recently crowned emperor Charlemagne was supported in the territory of present-day Bohemia. In 805, three Frankish corps (according to Petr Juřina numbering 30 to 40,000 men) undertook an expedition from Bohemia. The aim was to force the tributary dependence of the Czech tribes. Anno Domini 805 (Years of the Lord 805...) Carolus Imperator misit filium suum (Emperor Charles sent his son...) Charles called the Younger († 811), who invaded Bohemia with a great force. Et venerunt ad fluvium qui vocantur Agara (according to Chronicon Moissacense) ...in planicie Behaim (according to Annales Mettenses priores) (and they came to the river called Ohra ...on the Bohemian plain), there the three armies joined together. The first, composed of Saxons, advanced from the north through the Ore Mountains (Chronicon Moissacense uses hapax legomenon Fergunna for this range); it probably crossed them through the Nakléřovský pass and continued further along the valley of the Bílina river into the Ohar Basin. The second army, which consisted of the Bavarians together with the Alamans and Burgundians (according to the Annales regni Francorum) under the leadership of Adolf, the Bavarian prefect, and Werinhar, the prefect of the newly established Avar marque, entered Bohemia from the south along the traditional Golden Trail, probably through the present-day Strakonice or the Všerubský pass to the present-day Plzeň and then to Ohře either along the Berounka or through the territory of the present-day Rakovnick. The third and main army, led by the son of Charlemagne, Charles the Younger, marched along the so-called royal road from the upper Main crossing the Smrčina and further along the Ohře to the meeting point, from where the troops together arrived at Canburg Castle, which also besieged and plundered the country all around, on both sides of the Elbe river. In connection with the expedition, the role of the fourth, apparently only supporting army, which sailed along the Elbe to Magdeburg, where it ravaged a certain area of Genewara (probably Warnefeld or Gommern), and then returned to its homeland according to the Chronicon Moissacense, is somewhat unclear. It is most often assumed that it was intended to bind the military forces of the Velets, but this interpretation is uncertain. The troops of the Bohemian tribes against the attacking Frankish troops chose the tactic of avoiding combat and relied on the fact that a large army would not be able to sustain itself in the plundered country for a long time. Charles therefore wanted to conquer the Canburg fortress with joint forces. However, they did not manage to capture it even after a 40-day siege. During one of the skirmishes, the Bohemian prince Lech/Běch was supposed to die (in various editions of the Annales Mettenses priores and derived sources, the forms Lecho/Lech or Becho/Běch are also found). But it is not clear whether it was a proper name or a title. So Charles's army plundered the surroundings, and since there was neither fodder for the horses nor food for the troops, they returned home.
