= Potzehne =

- Stadtteil of Gardelegen
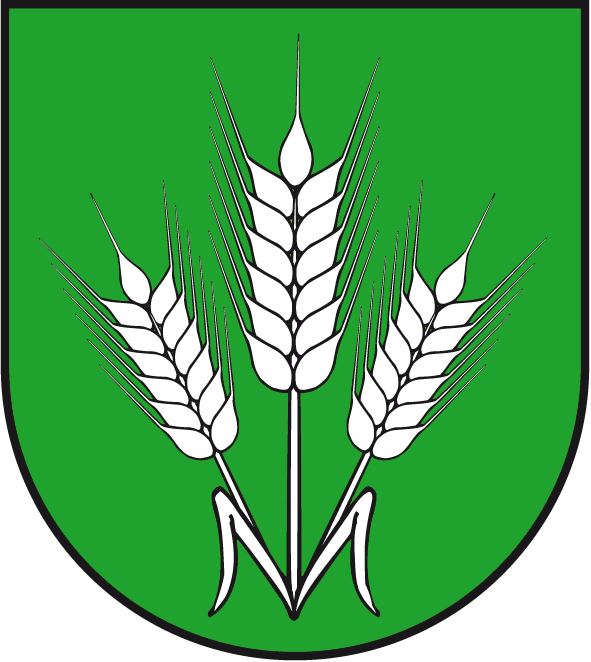
- Coat of arms
- Interactive map of Potzehne
- Location within Germany Location within Saxony-Anhalt
- Coordinates: 52°26′38″N 11°20′18″E
- Country: Germany
- State: Saxony-Anhalt
- District: Altmarkkreis Salzwedel
- Town: Gardelegen

Area
  - Total: 15.85 km^{2} (6.12 sq mi)
- Elevation: 58 m (190 ft)

Population (2006-12-31)
  - Total: 275
  - Density: 17.4/km^{2} (44.9/sq mi)
- Time zone: UTC+01:00 (CET)
  - Summer (DST): UTC+02:00 (CEST)
- Postal codes: 39638
- Dialling codes: 039087
- Vehicle registration: SAW

Potzehne is a village and a former municipality in the district Altmarkkreis Salzwedel, in Saxony-Anhalt, Germany.

Since 1 January 2010, it is part of the town Gardelegen.
