= Köckte =

- Ortsteil of Gardelegen
- Interactive map of Köckte
- Location within Germany Location within Saxony-Anhalt
- Coordinates: 52°31′06″N 11°08′00″E
- Country: Germany
- State: Saxony-Anhalt
- District: Altmarkkreis Salzwedel
- Town: Gardelegen

Area
  - Total: 17.65 km^{2} (6.81 sq mi)
- Elevation: 58 m (190 ft)

Population (2009-12-31)
  - Total: 423
  - Density: 24.0/km^{2} (62.1/sq mi)
- Time zone: UTC+01:00 (CET)
  - Summer (DST): UTC+02:00 (CEST)
- Postal codes: 39649
- Dialling codes: 039004
- Vehicle registration: SAW

Köckte (German pronunciation: [ˈkœktə]) is a village and a former municipality in the district Altmarkkreis Salzwedel, in Saxony-Anhalt, Germany. Since 1 January 2011, it is part of the town Gardelegen.
