= Mieste =

- Ortsteil of Gardelegen
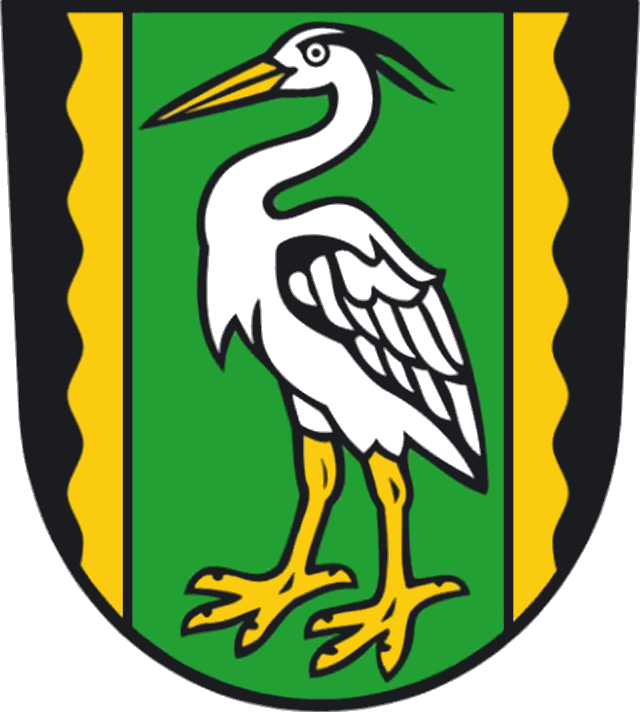
- Coat of arms
- Interactive map of Mieste
- Location within Germany Location within Saxony-Anhalt
- Coordinates: 52°28′44″N 11°12′11″E
- Country: Germany
- State: Saxony-Anhalt
- District: Altmarkkreis Salzwedel
- Town: Gardelegen

Area
  - Total: 37.38 km^{2} (14.43 sq mi)
- Elevation: 58 m (190 ft)

Population (2009-12-31)
  - Total: 2,234
  - Density: 59.76/km^{2} (154.8/sq mi)
- Time zone: UTC+01:00 (CET)
  - Summer (DST): UTC+02:00 (CEST)
- Postal codes: 39649
- Dialling codes: 039082
- Vehicle registration: SAW
- Website: www.mieste.de

Mieste (German pronunciation: [ˈmiːstə]) is a village and a former municipality in the district Altmarkkreis Salzwedel, in Saxony-Anhalt, Germany. Since 1 January 2011, it is part of the town Gardelegen.

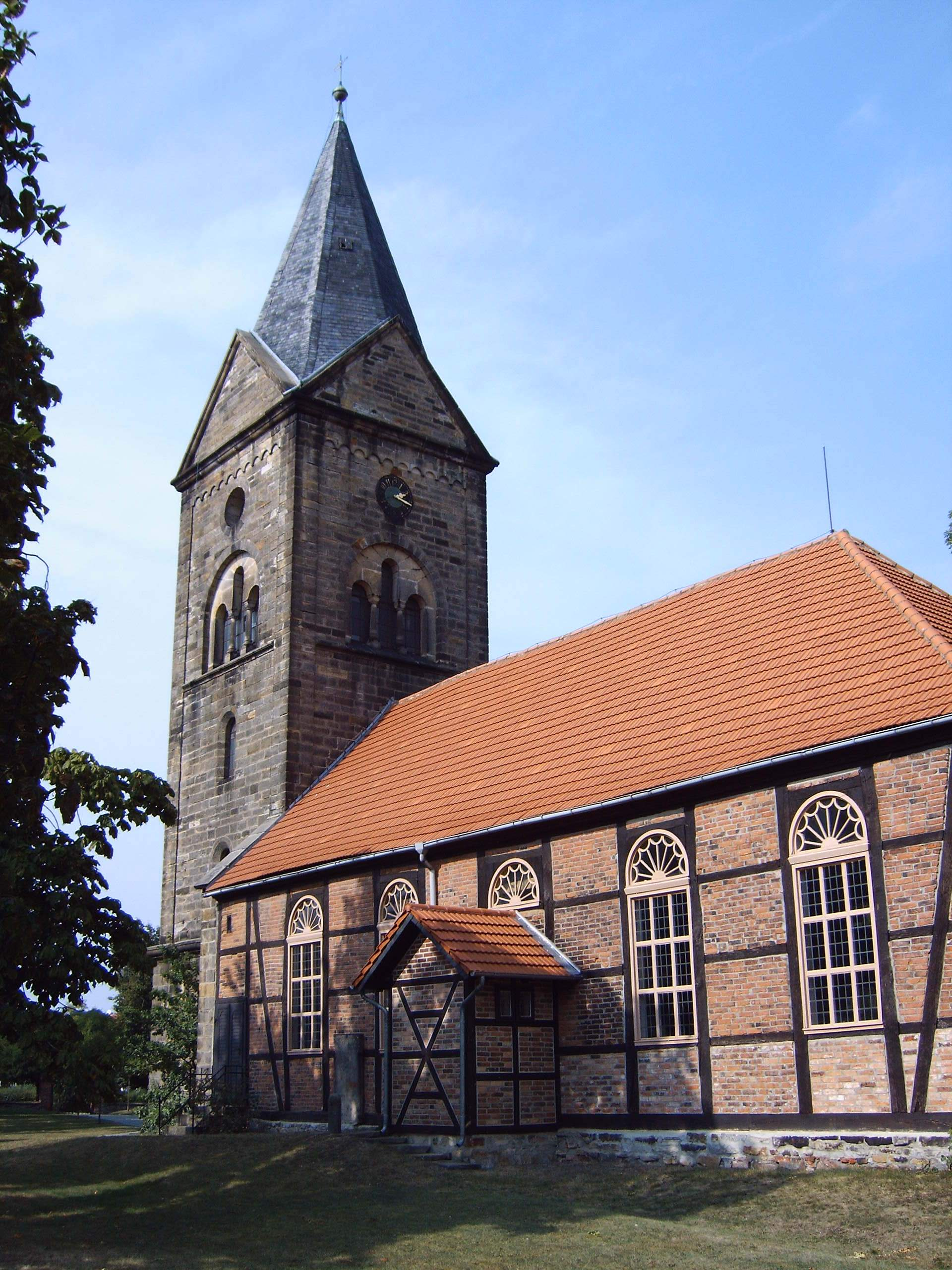
The Protestant Church

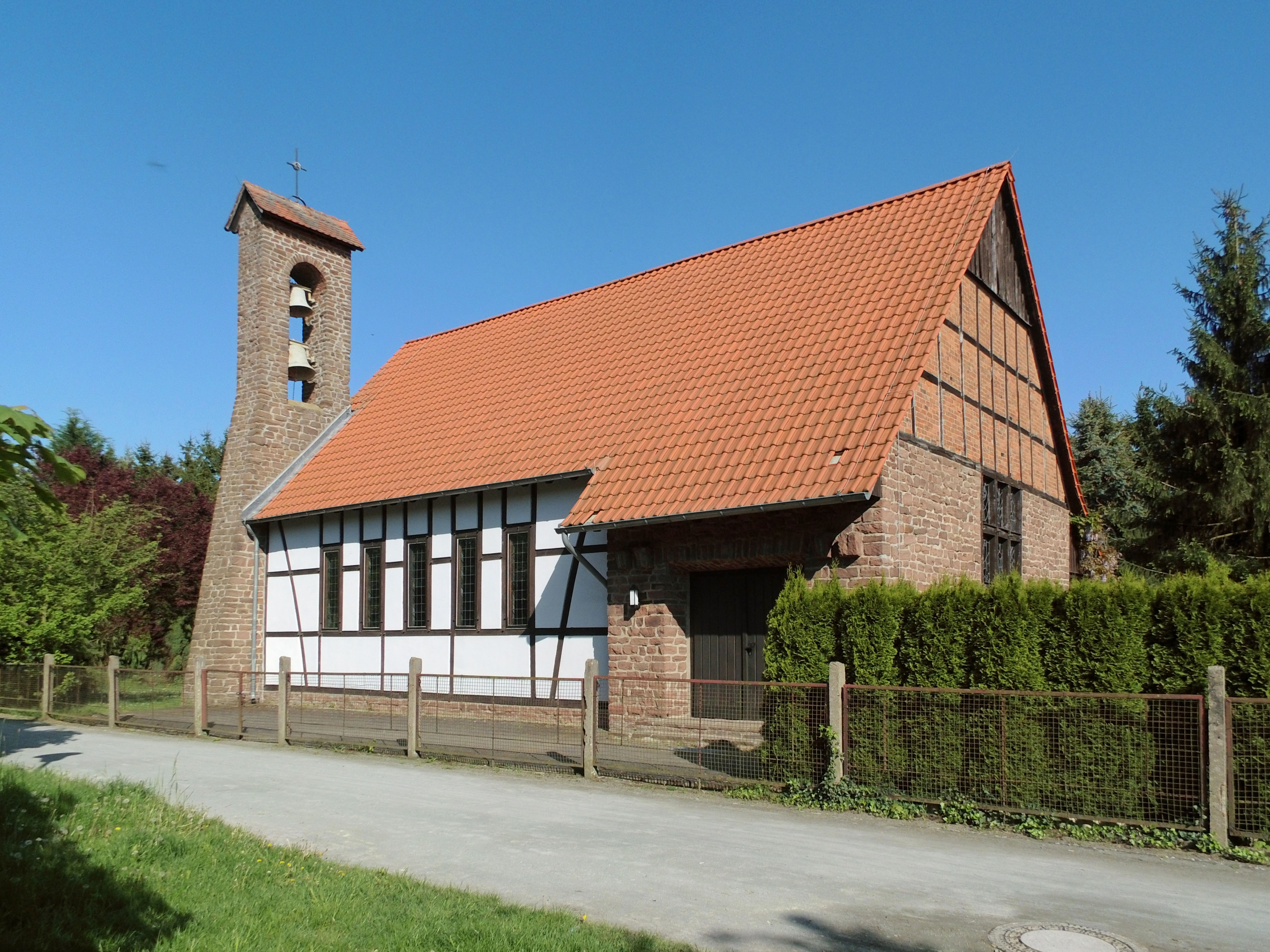
The Catholic Church
