= Sachau =

- Ortsteil of Gardelegen
- Interactive map of Sachau
- Location within Germany Location within Saxony-Anhalt
- Coordinates: 52°28′29″N 11°15′43″E
- Country: Germany
- State: Saxony-Anhalt
- District: Altmarkkreis Salzwedel
- Town: Gardelegen

Area
  - Total: 8.63 km^{2} (3.33 sq mi)
- Elevation: 57 m (187 ft)

Population (2009-12-31)
  - Total: 144
  - Density: 16.7/km^{2} (43.2/sq mi)
- Time zone: UTC+01:00 (CET)
  - Summer (DST): UTC+02:00 (CEST)
- Postal codes: 39649
- Dialling codes: 039082
- Vehicle registration: SAW

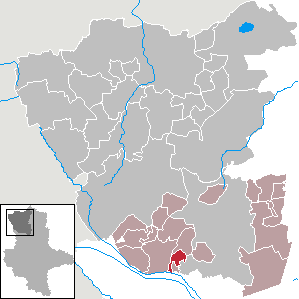

Sachau is a village and a former municipality in the district Altmarkkreis Salzwedel, in Saxony-Anhalt, Germany. Since 1 January 2011, it is part of the town Gardelegen.
