= Jerchel, Gardelegen =

Jerchel
- Ortsteil of Gardelegen
- Interactive map of Jerchel
- Location within Germany Location within Saxony-Anhalt
- Coordinates: 52°28′07″N 11°19′17″E
- Country: Germany
- State: Saxony-Anhalt
- District: Altmarkkreis Salzwedel
- Town: Gardelegen

Area
  - Total: 16.02 km^{2} (6.19 sq mi)
- Elevation: 58 m (190 ft)

Population (2009-12-31)
  - Total: 319
  - Density: 19.9/km^{2} (51.6/sq mi)
- Time zone: UTC+01:00 (CET)
  - Summer (DST): UTC+02:00 (CEST)
- Postal codes: 39638
- Dialling codes: 039087
- Vehicle registration: SAW
- Website: http://www.gemeinde-jerchel.de

Jerchel is a village and a former municipality in the district Altmarkkreis Salzwedel, in Saxony-Anhalt, Germany. Since 1 January 2011, it is part of the town Gardelegen.
