= Carl Wilhelm Hahn (journalist) =

German journalist, political editor, historian

Carl Wilhelm Hahn (8 June 1898 – 18 February 1982) was a German journalist, historian, archivist and head of the Schleswig-Holstein federal state’s so called Sippenamt (a state agency overseeing the archiving and analysis of family records, Sippe being a Nazi term for extended families) during the Nazi regime. As an active Anti-Semite, member of the NSDAP and the Sturmabteilung, he was of considerable importance for the implementation of the Nazi racist policy in Schleswig-Holstein and beyond. After the end of World War II, he quickly managed to gain a foothold again and to cover up his commitment to Nazi racial policy. As early as 1951 he was seconded to the press office of the state chancellery in Kiel, and from 1957 he worked again in the state archive of Schleswig-Holstein in Schleswig. Reaching his retirement age in 1963, he was recognized as a respected figure in local media.

== Family ==
Carl Wilhelm Hahn was born on June 8, 1898, in Emden as the son of the owner of a printing business and newspaper publisher Wilhelm Hahn and his wife Henriette, née Begemann, from a family of theologians.

== Life and career ==
After attending high school in Hameln from 1914, two years after the outbreak of First World War, he was drafted into military service in 1916 at the age of eighteen. He fought on the French front and in Flanders where he was seriously wounded in 1917. In 1918 he got his high school diploma in Hameln and from 1920 to 1922 he was trainee at an editor’s office . He then studied philology, German language and history at the University of Göttingen. After receiving his doctorate in 1924, he moved to Neumünster, where he found employment as editor of the regional daily 'Holsteinische Courier'

A year later, in 1925, C.W. Hahn married Luise Smidt, the daughter of a pastor from East Frisia. Shortly thereafter Hahn was promoted to chief editor and managing director of the 'Nordfriesische Rundschau' in Niebüll (1926-1929). In 1930 he became head of the ‘Protestant Press Association in Kiel, in 1935 of the national church press office, in 1937 he was also head of the church archives in the national church office in Kiel and head of the department for archive and church register matters. In addition, he held the honorary post of managing director of the ‘‘Reichsverband der Deutschen Presse’ (Reich Association of the German Press) until 1943. Politically, C.W. Hahn was nationalistically oriented. He became member first of the German Democratic Party, and from 1932 member of the NSDAP and the SA, from 1933 as SA Rottenführer. As head of the public Sippenamt (state agency for the archiving and analysis of family records) in Schleswig-Holstein, from 1943 with the rank of state archive councilor, he tried to set up numerous regional ‘family record agencies’ in cooperation with church offices.

Dr C.W. Hahn published a lot. His bibliography listed several hundred publications. He not only wrote journalistically about daily politics, but also about local history, for example about the Frisian language and customs, about the history of book printing and biographies and genealogies of Schleswig-Holstein pastors.

As head of the regional church press office, he aggressively supported Nazi politics. As head of the state ‘Sippenamt’, he was particularly responsible for Aryan records, family- and rural farm-research, migration movements and biographical and local cultural research. In these functions, he was significantly involved as a desk clerk and responsible for the ideological propaganda of the Nazi regime in general and the implementation of Nazi racial policy in particular - among others his institute had the task to identify Jewish origins of German families. In 1943 he emphasized the necessity of the "complete elimination of this foreign body" (the Jews) from the German people and from the peoples of Europe in an article on the ‘Jewish question’ in the Journal for the history of Schleswig-Holstein (ZSHG). Although C.W. Hahn later-on opposed "racial fanaticism", as far as is known, he never self-critically reviewed his own role in supporting the Nazi racial ideology even not after the war.

After the end of the war, the British military government suspended C.W. Hahn who had to quit service on 26 July 1945 and imprisoned him in the internment camp in the district of Gardelegen until 1948. He then began working again at the State Archives of Schleswig-Holstein, first as a temporary employee, and from 1950 as a civil servant at the State Archives in Kiel. A year later (1951) he was seconded to the press office of the Kiel state chancellery, and from 1957 he worked again in the state archive. On the occasion of his retirement when he reached retirement age in 1963, local media such as the Kieler Nachrichten recognized him as a respected personality in the country, as it did on occasion of his death in Kiel on 18 February 1982, describing him as a 'respectable citizen'.

== Works ==
- Wilhelm Hahn (1943): "Wilhelm Hahn (1943): Der Kampf schleswig-holsteinischer Städte gegen die Judenemanzipation, in: ZSHG 70/71, 1943, p. 308".
- Wilhelm Hahn (1964): Die Papiermühle Rastorf in Schleswig-Holstein, in: Papiergeschichte, Bd. 14, H. 5/6 (1964), pp. 57-60, access-date=2022-01-15
- Wilhelm Hahn (1969): Geschichte der Steinfurter Papiermühle, in: Papiergeschichte, Bd. 19, H. 3/4 (1969), pp. 45-47, access-date=2022-01-15

== Literature ==
- Nordkirche (2022): Wie die Landeskirchen Nordelbiens mit ihrer NS-Vergangenheit umgingen. Eine Wanderausstellung der Nordkirche 2016 – 2019. Kiel / Schwerin: Evangelisch-Lutherische Kirche in Norddeutschland, access-date=2022-01-15
- Wolbert G.C. Smidt & Anneliese El Naggar (2022): Carl Wilhelm Hahn, in: Ostfriesische Landschaft, access-date=2022-01-15
- Stephan Linck (2022): Alles, was Wissen schafft, Die Nordkirche und ihr Umgang mit der NS-Vergangenheit. Podcast # 16 with Stephan Linck, 20 January 2022. Kiel: [Podcast der Landesvertretung Schleswig-Holstein], 40:54 Min. and accessible as Transkript, access-date=2022-01-15
