= Kassieck =

- Ortsteil of Gardelegen
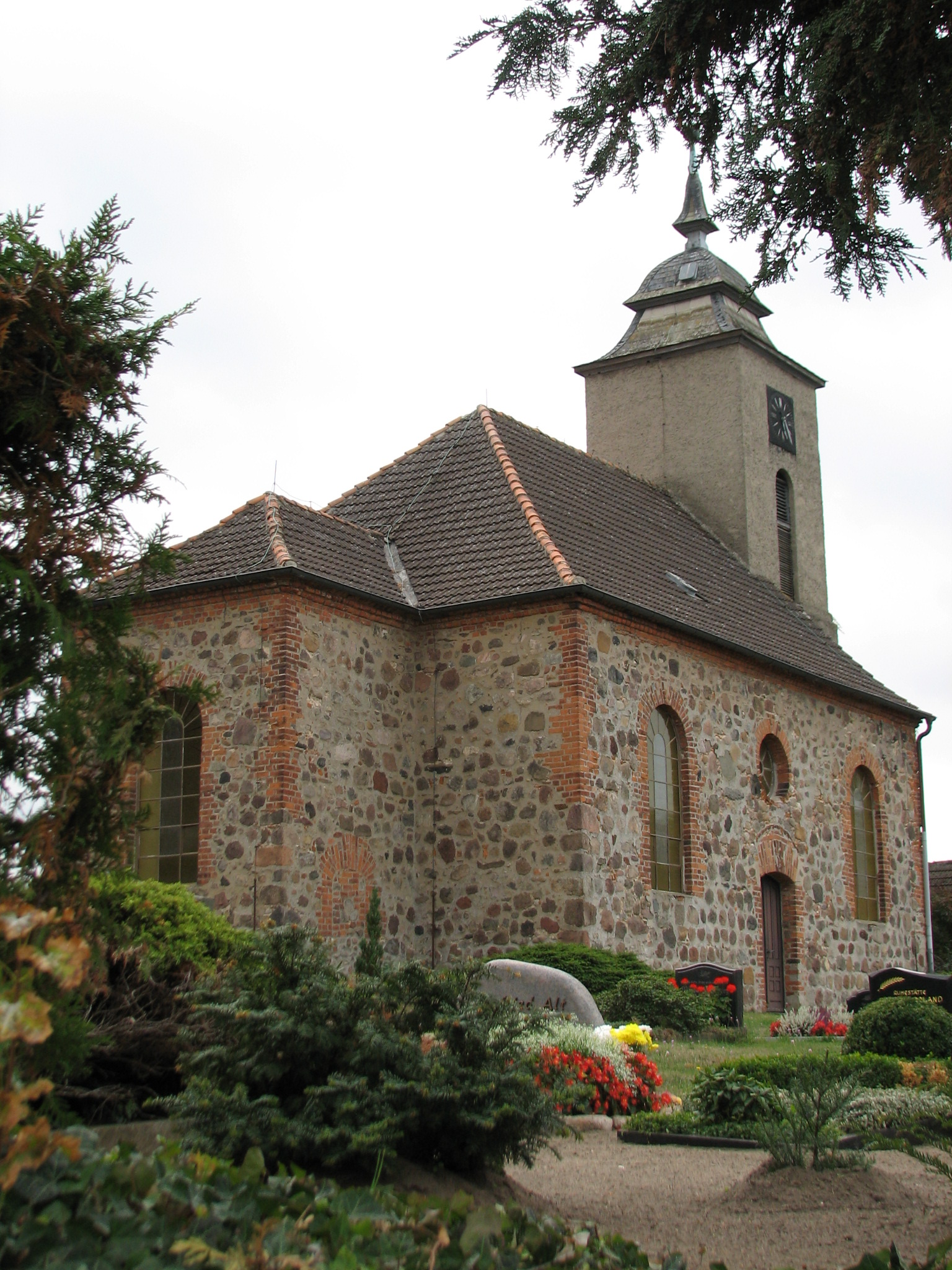
- A church in Kassieck

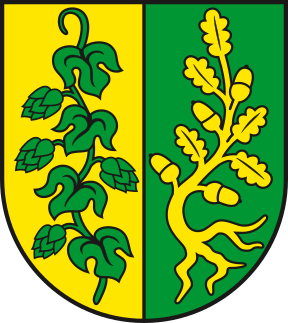
- Coat of arms
- Interactive map of Kassieck
- Location within Germany Location within Saxony-Anhalt
- Coordinates: 52°35′11″N 11°29′08″E
- Country: Germany
- State: Saxony-Anhalt
- District: Altmarkkreis Salzwedel
- Town: Gardelegen

Area
  - Total: 10.51 km^{2} (4.06 sq mi)
- Elevation: 60 m (200 ft)

Population (2009-12-31)
  - Total: 193
  - Density: 18.4/km^{2} (47.6/sq mi)
- Time zone: UTC+01:00 (CET)
  - Summer (DST): UTC+02:00 (CEST)
- Postal codes: 39638
- Dialling codes: 039084
- Vehicle registration: SAW

Kassieck is a village and a former municipality in the district Altmarkkreis Salzwedel, in Saxony-Anhalt, Germany. Since 1 January 2011, it has been part of the town of Gardelegen.
