= Miesterhorst =

- Ortsteil of Gardelegen
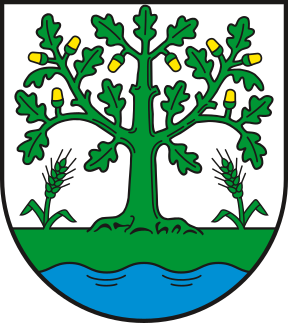
- Coat of arms
- Interactive map of Miesterhorst
- Location within Germany Location within Saxony-Anhalt
- Coordinates: 52°27′38″N 11°08′30″E
- Country: Germany
- State: Saxony-Anhalt
- District: Altmarkkreis Salzwedel
- Town: Gardelegen

Area
  - Total: 22.64 km^{2} (8.74 sq mi)
- Elevation: 57 m (187 ft)

Population (2009-12-31)
  - Total: 695
  - Density: 30.7/km^{2} (79.5/sq mi)
- Time zone: UTC+01:00 (CET)
  - Summer (DST): UTC+02:00 (CEST)
- Postal codes: 39649
- Dialling codes: 039006
- Vehicle registration: SAW
- Website: www.miesterhorst.de

Miesterhorst (German pronunciation: [ˈmiːstɐhɔʁst]) is a village and a former municipality in the district Altmarkkreis Salzwedel, in Saxony-Anhalt, Germany. Since 1 January 2011 it is part of the town of Gardelegen.
