= Jeggau =

- Ortsteil of Gardelegen
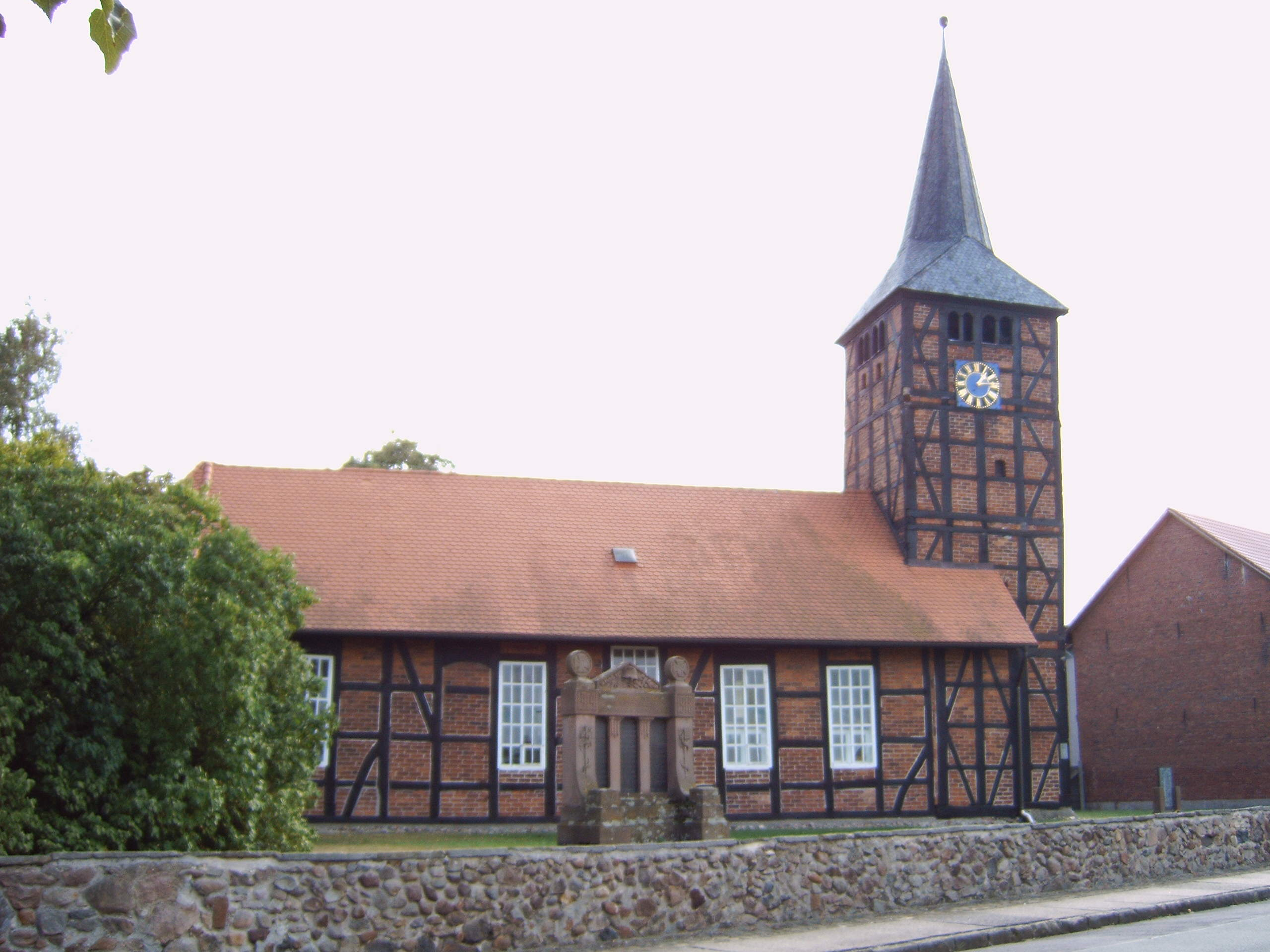
- A rural church in Jeggau

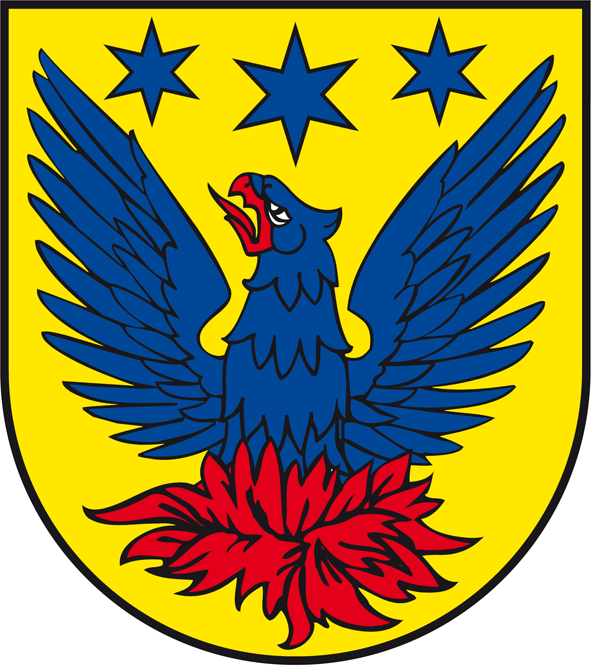
- Coat of arms
- Interactive map of Jeggau
- Location within Germany Location within Saxony-Anhalt
- Coordinates: 52°32′12″N 11°12′12″E
- Country: Germany
- State: Saxony-Anhalt
- District: Altmarkkreis Salzwedel
- Town: Gardelegen

Area
  - Total: 12.30 km^{2} (4.75 sq mi)
- Elevation: 62 m (203 ft)

Population (2009-12-31)
  - Total: 229
  - Density: 18.6/km^{2} (48.2/sq mi)
- Time zone: UTC+01:00 (CET)
  - Summer (DST): UTC+02:00 (CEST)
- Postal codes: 39649
- Dialling codes: 039082
- Vehicle registration: SAW

Jeggau (German pronunciation: [ˈjɛɡaʊ]) is a village and a former municipality in the district Altmarkkreis Salzwedel, in Saxony-Anhalt, Germany. Since 1 January 2011, it is part of the town Gardelegen.
