= Kloster Neuendorf =

- Stadtteil of Gardelegen
- Interactive map of Kloster Neuendorf
- Location within Germany Location within Saxony-Anhalt
- Coordinates: 52°31′36″N 11°28′00″E
- Country: Germany
- State: Saxony-Anhalt
- District: Altmarkkreis Salzwedel
- Town: Gardelegen

Area
  - Total: 19.84 km^{2} (7.66 sq mi)
- Elevation: 58 m (190 ft)

Population (2006-12-31)
  - Total: 510
  - Density: 26/km^{2} (67/sq mi)
- Time zone: UTC+01:00 (CET)
  - Summer (DST): UTC+02:00 (CEST)
- Postal codes: 39638
- Dialling codes: 03907
- Vehicle registration: SAW

Kloster Neuendorf (German pronunciation: [ˈkloːstɐ ˈnɔʏəndɔʁf]) is a village and a former municipality in the district Altmarkkreis Salzwedel, in Saxony-Anhalt, Germany. Since 1 July 2009, it is part of the town Gardelegen.
