= Solpke =

- Ortsteil of Gardelegen
- Interactive map of Solpke
- Location within Germany Location within Saxony-Anhalt
- Coordinates: 52°30′22″N 11°17′14″E
- Country: Germany
- State: Saxony-Anhalt
- District: Altmarkkreis Salzwedel
- Town: Gardelegen

Area
  - Total: 15.87 km^{2} (6.13 sq mi)
- Elevation: 59 m (194 ft)

Population (2009-12-31)
  - Total: 576
  - Density: 36.3/km^{2} (94.0/sq mi)
- Time zone: UTC+01:00 (CET)
  - Summer (DST): UTC+02:00 (CEST)
- Postal codes: 39638
- Dialling codes: 039087
- Vehicle registration: SAW

Solpke (German pronunciation: [ˈzɔlpkə]) is a village and a former municipality in the district Altmarkkreis Salzwedel, in Saxony-Anhalt, Germany. Since 1 January 2011, it is part of the town Gardelegen.
