= Jävenitz =

- Ortsteil of Gardelegen
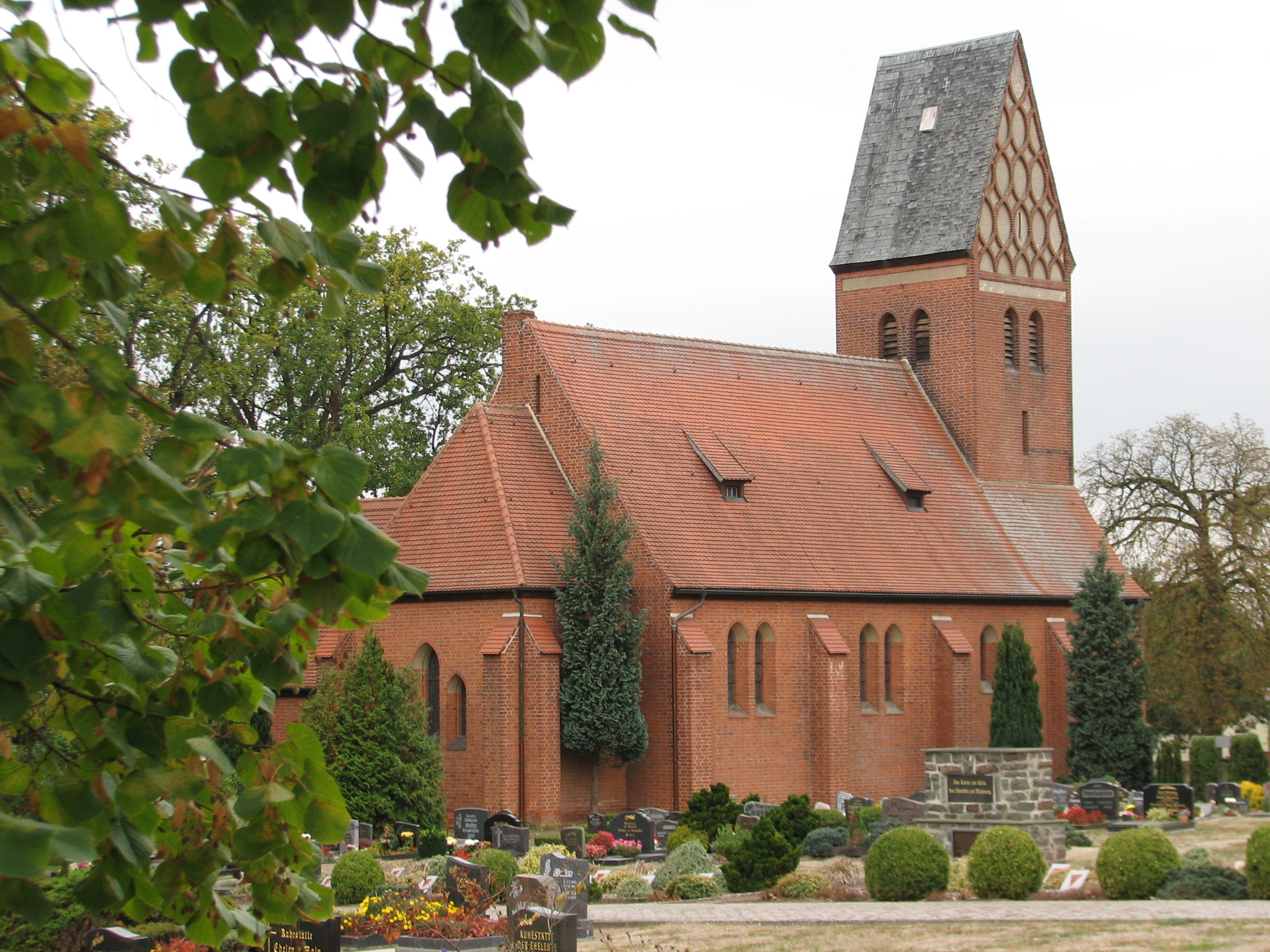
- A church in Jävenitz
- Interactive map of Jävenitz
- Location within Germany Location within Saxony-Anhalt
- Coordinates: 52°31′25″N 11°29′57″E
- Country: Germany
- State: Saxony-Anhalt
- District: Altmarkkreis Salzwedel
- Town: Gardelegen

Area
  - Total: 53.72 km^{2} (20.74 sq mi)
- Elevation: 74 m (243 ft)

Population (2009-12-31)
  - Total: 1,119
  - Density: 20.83/km^{2} (53.95/sq mi)
- Time zone: UTC+01:00 (CET)
  - Summer (DST): UTC+02:00 (CEST)
- Postal codes: 39638
- Dialling codes: 039086
- Vehicle registration: SAW

Jävenitz is a village and a former municipality in the district Altmarkkreis Salzwedel, in Saxony-Anhalt, Germany. Since 1 January 2011, it is part of the town Gardelegen.
