= Estedt =

- Ortsteil of Gardelegen
- Interactive map of Estedt
- Location within Germany Location within Saxony-Anhalt
- Coordinates: 52°34′33″N 11°21′31″E
- Country: Germany
- State: Saxony-Anhalt
- District: Altmarkkreis Salzwedel
- Town: Gardelegen

Area
  - Total: 14.85 km^{2} (5.73 sq mi)
- Elevation: 36 m (118 ft)

Population (2009-12-31)
  - Total: 389
  - Density: 26.2/km^{2} (67.8/sq mi)
- Time zone: UTC+01:00 (CET)
  - Summer (DST): UTC+02:00 (CEST)
- Postal codes: 39638
- Dialling codes: 03907
- Vehicle registration: SAW

Estedt (German pronunciation: [ˈeːʃtɛt]) is a village and a former municipality in the district Altmarkkreis Salzwedel, in Saxony-Anhalt, Germany. Since 1 January 2011, it is part of the town Gardelegen.
