= Sichau =

- Ortsteil of Gardelegen
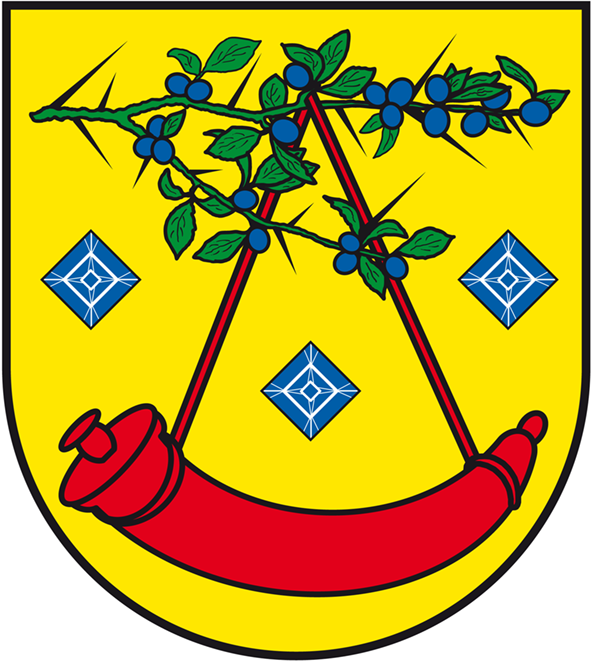
- Coat of arms
- Interactive map of Sichau
- Location within Germany Location within Saxony-Anhalt
- Coordinates: 52°31′01″N 11°13′19″E
- Country: Germany
- State: Saxony-Anhalt
- District: Altmarkkreis Salzwedel
- Town: Gardelegen

Area
  - Total: 25.25 km^{2} (9.75 sq mi)
- Elevation: 59 m (194 ft)

Population (2009-12-31)
  - Total: 256
  - Density: 10.1/km^{2} (26.3/sq mi)
- Time zone: UTC+01:00 (CET)
  - Summer (DST): UTC+02:00 (CEST)
- Postal codes: 39649
- Dialling codes: 039082
- Vehicle registration: SAW

Sichau (German pronunciation: [ˈzɪçaʊ]) is a village and a former municipality in the district Altmarkkreis Salzwedel, in Saxony-Anhalt, Germany. Since 1 January 2011, it is part of the town Gardelegen.
