= Letzlingen =

- Ortsteil of Gardelegen
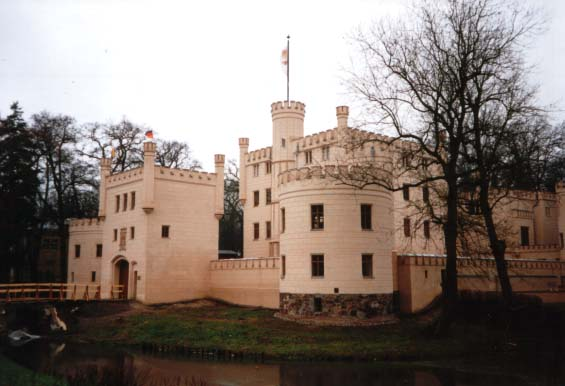
- A hunting lodge in Letzlingen

- Coat of arms
- Interactive map of Letzlingen
- Location within Germany Location within Saxony-Anhalt
- Coordinates: 52°26′49″N 11°29′8″E
- Country: Germany
- State: Saxony-Anhalt
- District: Altmarkkreis Salzwedel
- Town: Gardelegen

Area
  - Total: 64.71 km^{2} (24.98 sq mi)
- Elevation: 86 m (282 ft)

Population (2009-12-31)
  - Total: 1,532
  - Density: 23.67/km^{2} (61.32/sq mi)
- Time zone: UTC+01:00 (CET)
  - Summer (DST): UTC+02:00 (CEST)
- Postal codes: 39638
- Dialling codes: 039088
- Vehicle registration: SAW
- Website: www.letzlingen.de

Letzlingen (German pronunciation: [ˈlɛtslɪŋən]) is a village and a former municipality in the district Altmarkkreis Salzwedel, in Saxony-Anhalt, Germany. Since 1 January 2011, it is part of the town Gardelegen.
