= Dannefeld =

- Ortsteil of Gardelegen
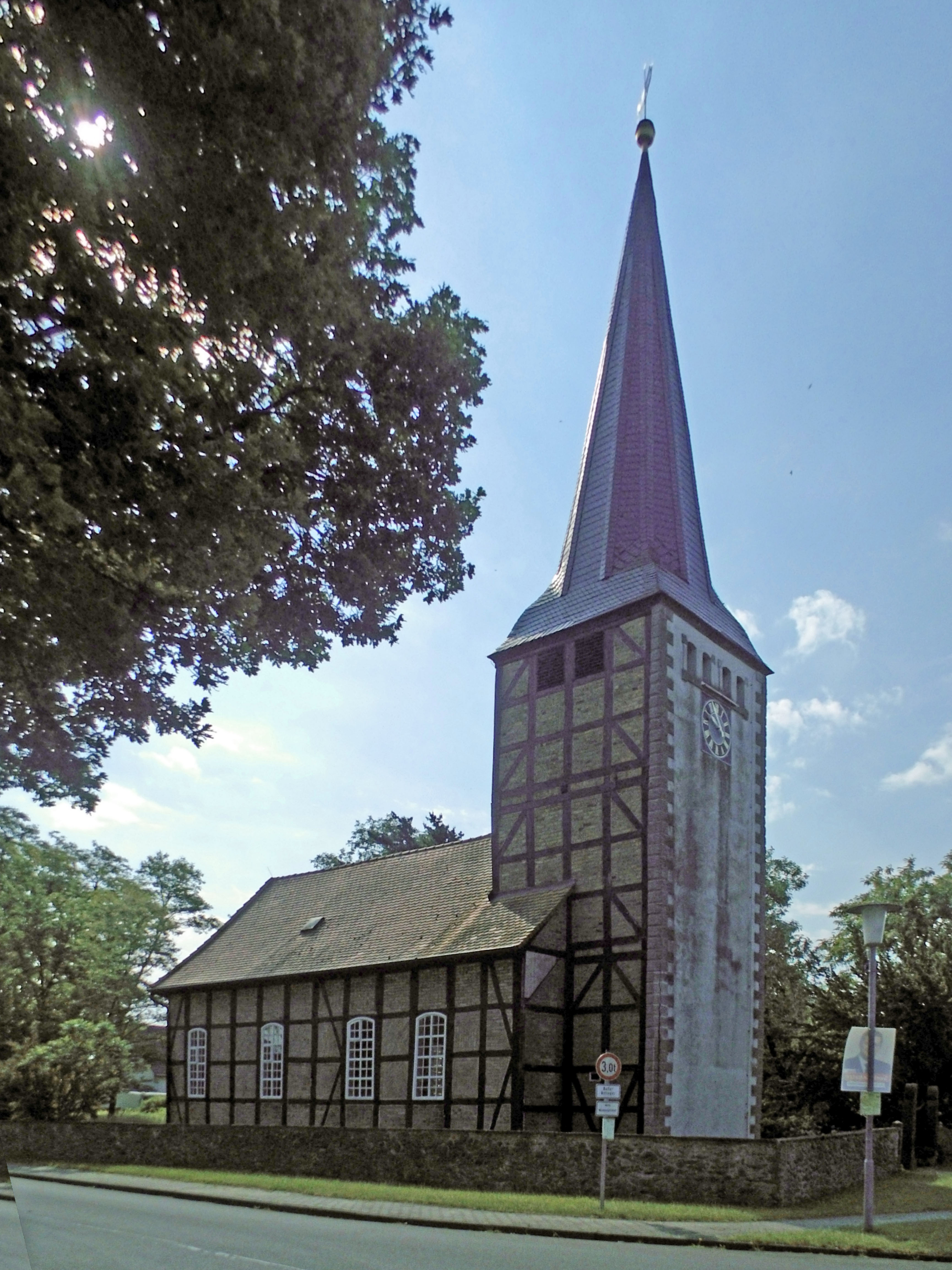
- Interactive map of Dannefeld
- Location within Germany Location within Saxony-Anhalt
- Coordinates: 52°30′26″N 11°08′28″E
- Country: Germany
- State: Saxony-Anhalt
- District: Altmarkkreis Salzwedel
- Town: Gardelegen

Area
  - Total: 18.58 km^{2} (7.17 sq mi)
- Elevation: 56 m (184 ft)

Population (2009-12-31)
  - Total: 380
  - Density: 20/km^{2} (53/sq mi)
- Time zone: UTC+01:00 (CET)
  - Summer (DST): UTC+02:00 (CEST)
- Postal codes: 39649
- Dialling codes: 039004
- Vehicle registration: SAW

Dannefeld (German pronunciation: [ˈdanəfɛlt]) is a village and a former municipality in the district Altmarkkreis Salzwedel, in Saxony-Anhalt, Germany. Since 1 January 2011, it is part of the town Gardelegen.
