= Seethen =

- Ortsteil of Gardelegen
- Interactive map of Seethen
- Location within Germany Location within Saxony-Anhalt
- Coordinates: 52°35′18″N 11°33′48″E
- Country: Germany
- State: Saxony-Anhalt
- District: Altmarkkreis Salzwedel
- Town: Gardelegen

Area
  - Total: 10.00 km^{2} (3.86 sq mi)
- Elevation: 54 m (177 ft)

Population (2009-12-31)
  - Total: 155
  - Density: 15.5/km^{2} (40.1/sq mi)
- Time zone: UTC+01:00 (CET)
  - Summer (DST): UTC+02:00 (CEST)
- Postal codes: 39638
- Dialling codes: 039084
- Vehicle registration: SAW

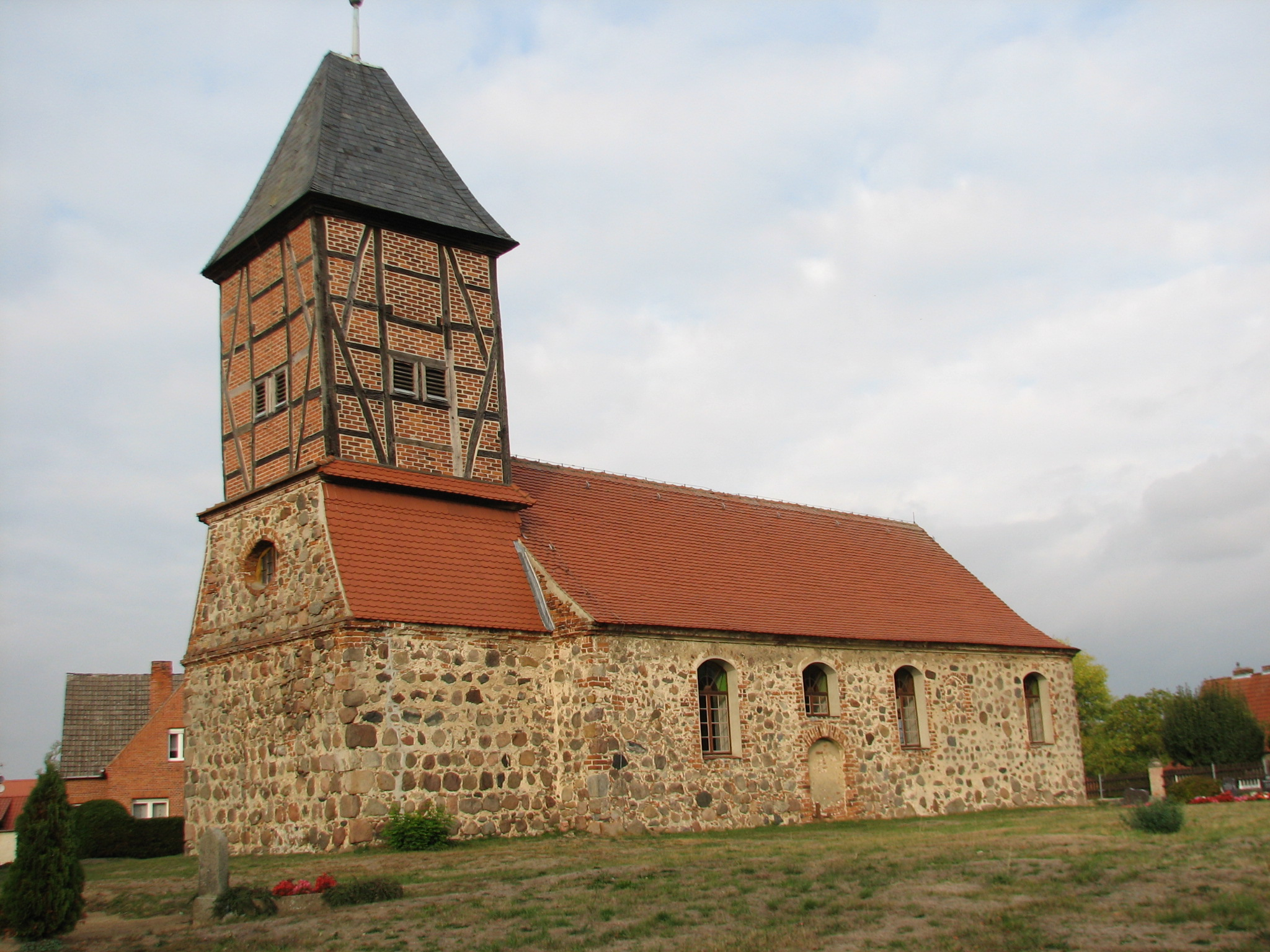

Seethen (German pronunciation: [ˈzeːtn̩]) is a village and a former municipality in the district Altmarkkreis Salzwedel, in Saxony-Anhalt, Germany. Since 1 January 2011, it is part of the town Gardelegen.
