= Hemstedt =

- Stadtteil of Gardelegen
- Interactive map of Hemstedt
- Location within Germany Location within Saxony-Anhalt
- Coordinates: 52°34′00″N 11°26′00″E
- Country: Germany
- State: Saxony-Anhalt
- District: Altmarkkreis Salzwedel
- Town: Gardelegen

Area
  - Total: 18.76 km^{2} (7.24 sq mi)
- Elevation: 46 m (151 ft)

Population (2006-12-31)
  - Total: 294
  - Density: 15.7/km^{2} (40.6/sq mi)
- Time zone: UTC+01:00 (CET)
  - Summer (DST): UTC+02:00 (CEST)
- Postal codes: 39638
- Dialling codes: 03907
- Vehicle registration: SAW

Hemstedt is a village and a former municipality in the district Altmarkkreis Salzwedel, in Saxony-Anhalt, Germany. Since 1 July 2009, it is part of the town Gardelegen.
