= Lindstedt (Gardelegen) =

- Ortsteil of Gardelegen
- Coat of arms
- Interactive map of Lindstedt
- Location within Germany Location within Saxony-Anhalt
- Coordinates: 52°35′27″N 11°31′46″E
- Country: Germany
- State: Saxony-Anhalt
- District: Altmarkkreis Salzwedel
- Town: Gardelegen

Area
  - Total: 19.80 km^{2} (7.64 sq mi)
- Elevation: 37 m (121 ft)

Population (2009-12-31)
  - Total: 563
  - Density: 28.4/km^{2} (73.6/sq mi)
- Time zone: UTC+01:00 (CET)
  - Summer (DST): UTC+02:00 (CEST)
- Postal codes: 39638
- Dialling codes: 039084
- Vehicle registration: SAW

Lindstedt (German pronunciation: [ˈlɪntʃtɛt]) is a village and a former municipality in the district Altmarkkreis Salzwedel, in Saxony-Anhalt, Germany. Since 1 January 2011, it is part of the town Gardelegen.
