= Hottendorf =

- Ortsteil of Gardelegen
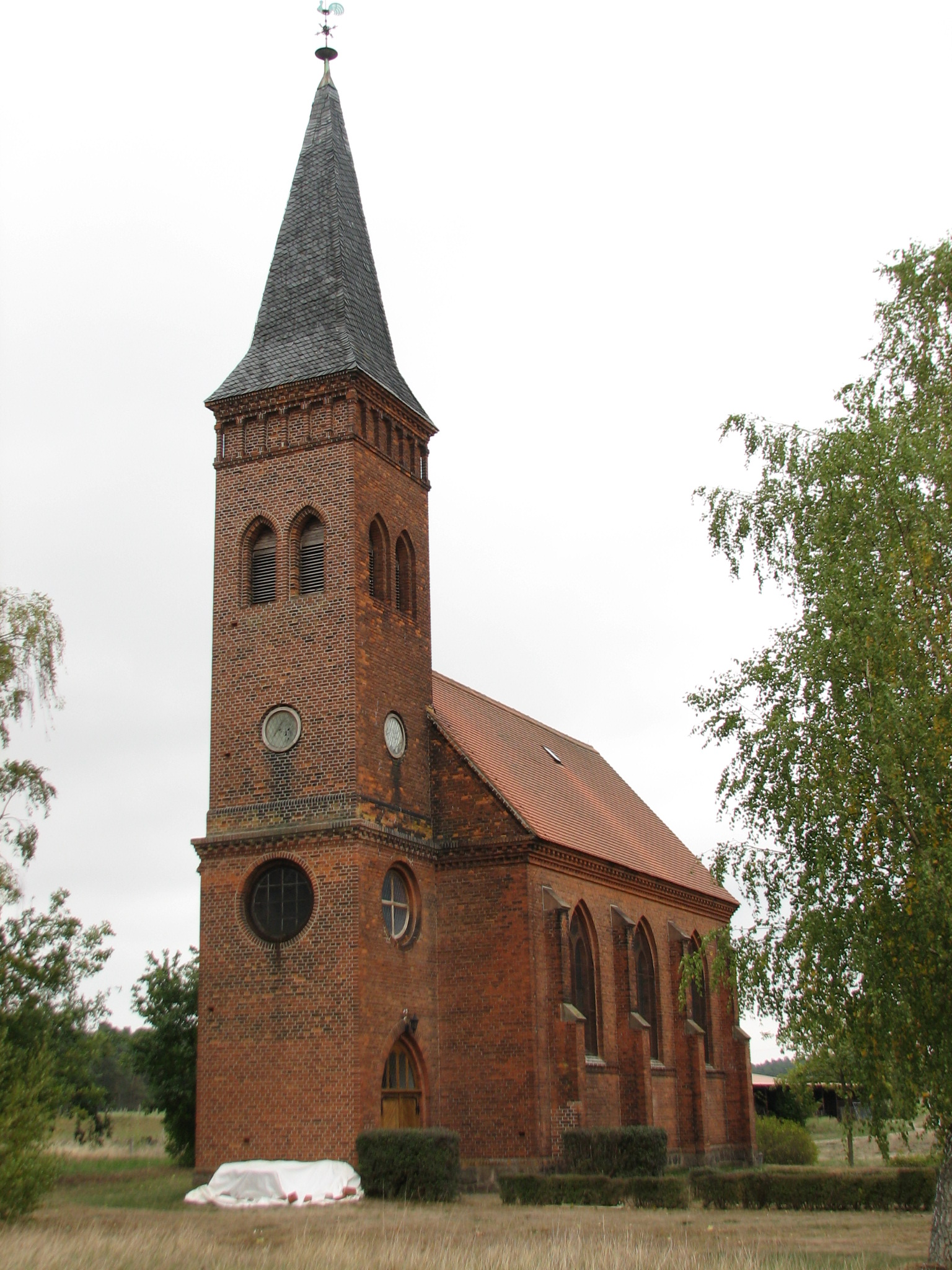
- A church in Hottendorf
- Interactive map of Hottendorf
- Location within Germany Location within Saxony-Anhalt
- Coordinates: 52°31′52″N 11°32′02″E
- Country: Germany
- State: Saxony-Anhalt
- District: Altmarkkreis Salzwedel
- Town: Gardelegen

Area
  - Total: 14.66 km^{2} (5.66 sq mi)
- Elevation: 83 m (272 ft)

Population (2009-12-31)
  - Total: 267
  - Density: 18.2/km^{2} (47.2/sq mi)
- Time zone: UTC+01:00 (CET)
  - Summer (DST): UTC+02:00 (CEST)
- Postal codes: 39638
- Dialling codes: 039086
- Vehicle registration: SAW

Hottendorf (German pronunciation: [ˈhɔtn̩ˌdɔʁf]) is a village and a former municipality in the district Altmarkkreis Salzwedel, in Saxony-Anhalt, Germany. Since 1 January 2011, it is part of the town Gardelegen.
