= Berge (Saxony-Anhalt) =

- Stadtteil of Gardelegen
- Interactive map of Berge
- Location within Germany Location within Saxony-Anhalt
- Coordinates: 52°33′12″N 11°22′00″E
- Country: Germany
- State: Saxony-Anhalt
- District: Altmarkkreis Salzwedel
- Town: Gardelegen

Area
  - Total: 28.12 km^{2} (10.86 sq mi)
- Elevation: 45 m (148 ft)

Population (2006-12-31)
  - Total: 726
  - Density: 25.8/km^{2} (66.9/sq mi)
- Time zone: UTC+01:00 (CET)
  - Summer (DST): UTC+02:00 (CEST)
- Postal codes: 39638
- Dialling codes: 03907
- Vehicle registration: SAW

Berge (German pronunciation: [ˈbɛʁɡə]) is a village and a former municipality in the district Altmarkkreis Salzwedel, in Saxony-Anhalt, Germany. Since 1 July 2009, it has been part of the town Gardelegen. The local Berge Village Church has been called "The Sistine Chapel of the Altmark."

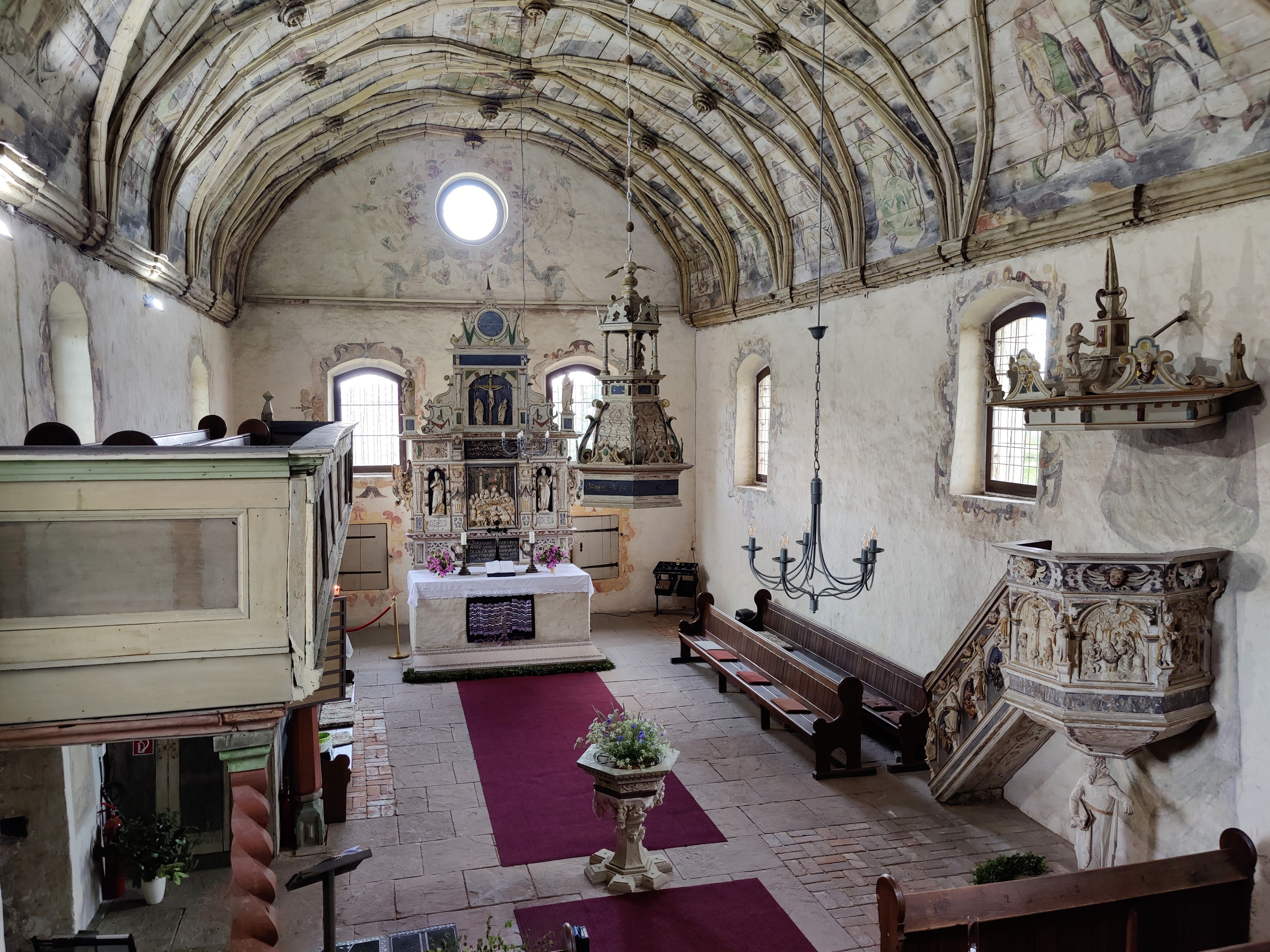
Interior of the Berge Village Church
