= Breitenfeld, Saxony-Anhalt =

Breitenfeld
- Ortsteil of Gardelegen
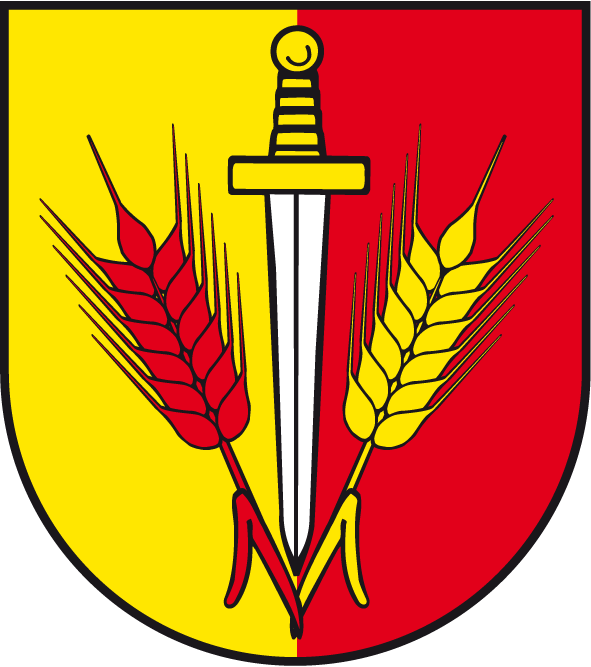
- Coat of arms
- Interactive map of Breitenfeld
- Location within Germany Location within Saxony-Anhalt
- Coordinates: 52°34′06″N 11°15′12″E
- Country: Germany
- State: Saxony-Anhalt
- District: Altmarkkreis Salzwedel
- Town: Gardelegen

Area
  - Total: 15.98 km^{2} (6.17 sq mi)
- Elevation: 73 m (240 ft)

Population (2009-12-31)
  - Total: 145
  - Density: 9.07/km^{2} (23.5/sq mi)
- Time zone: UTC+01:00 (CET)
  - Summer (DST): UTC+02:00 (CEST)
- Postal codes: 39638
- Dialling codes: 039085
- Vehicle registration: SAW

Breitenfeld (German pronunciation: [ˈbʁaɪtn̩ˌfɛlt]) is a village and a former municipality in the district Altmarkkreis Salzwedel, in Saxony-Anhalt, Germany. Since 1 January 2011, it has been part of the town of Gardelegen.
