= Wannefeld =

- Stadtteil of Gardelegen
- Interactive map of Wannefeld
- Location within Germany Location within Saxony-Anhalt
- Coordinates: 52°26′18″N 11°26′46″E
- Country: Germany
- State: Saxony-Anhalt
- District: Altmarkkreis Salzwedel
- Town: Gardelegen

Area
  - Total: 24.55 km^{2} (9.48 sq mi)
- Elevation: 69 m (226 ft)

Population (2006-12-31)
  - Total: 287
  - Density: 11.7/km^{2} (30.3/sq mi)
- Time zone: UTC+01:00 (CET)
  - Summer (DST): UTC+02:00 (CEST)
- Postal codes: 39638
- Dialling codes: 039088
- Vehicle registration: SAW

Wannefeld (German pronunciation: [ˈvanəfɛlt]) is a village and a former municipality in the district Altmarkkreis Salzwedel, in Saxony-Anhalt, Germany.

Since 1 January 2010, it is part of the town Gardelegen.
