= William Hahn =

German painter

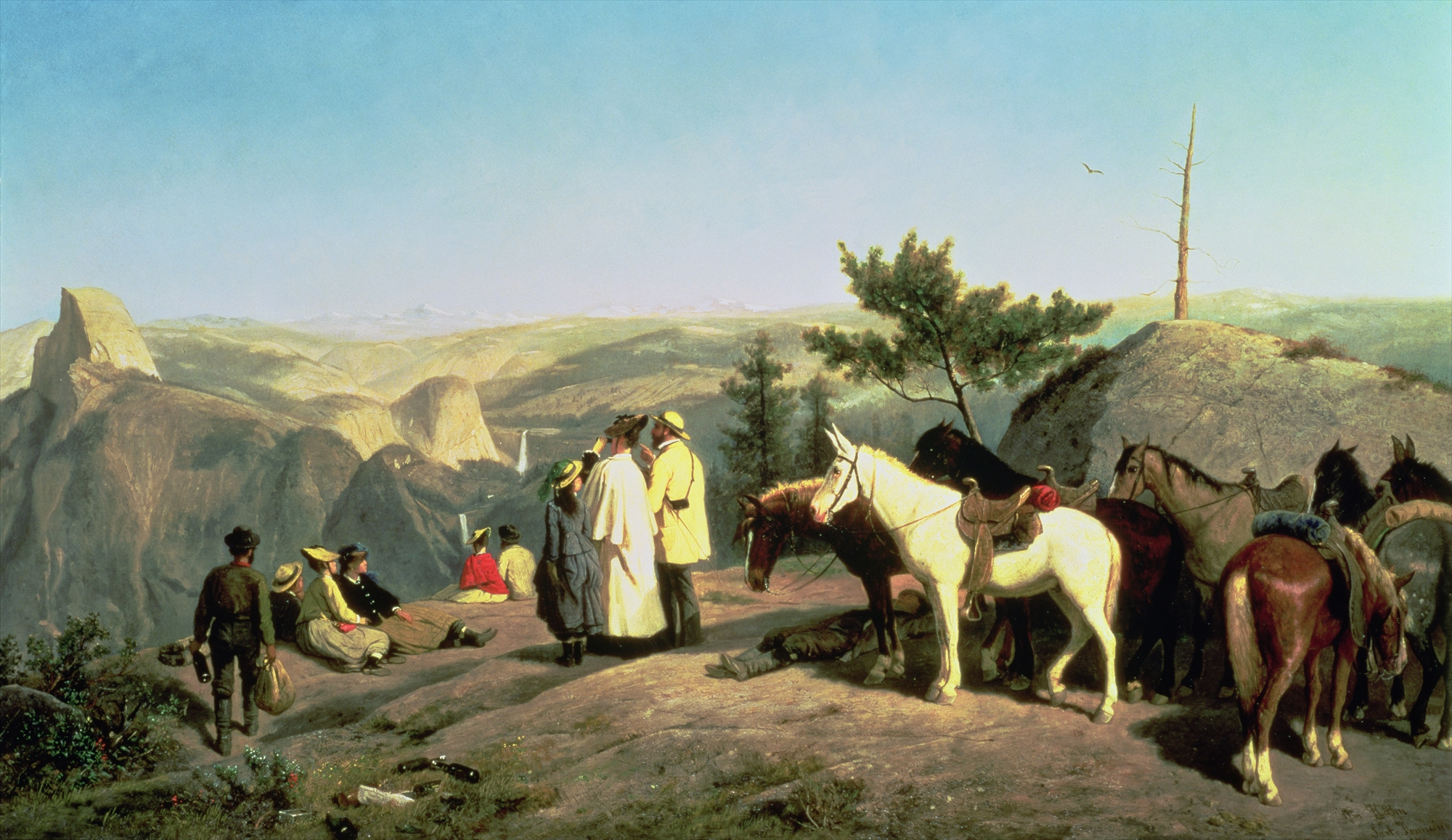
Yosemite Valley from Glacier Point, 1874

William Hahn (born Carl Wilhelm Hahn; 7 January 1829 – 8 June 1887), was a German painter active in the United States known for his genre paintings of California. Born in Ebersbach, Saxony, he trained at the Dresden Academy of Fine Arts and the Düsseldorf Academy. He befriended Scotch artist William Keith, and accompanied Keith to the United States, where the two founded a Boston studio before traveling to California.
