= Gardelegen =

- Town
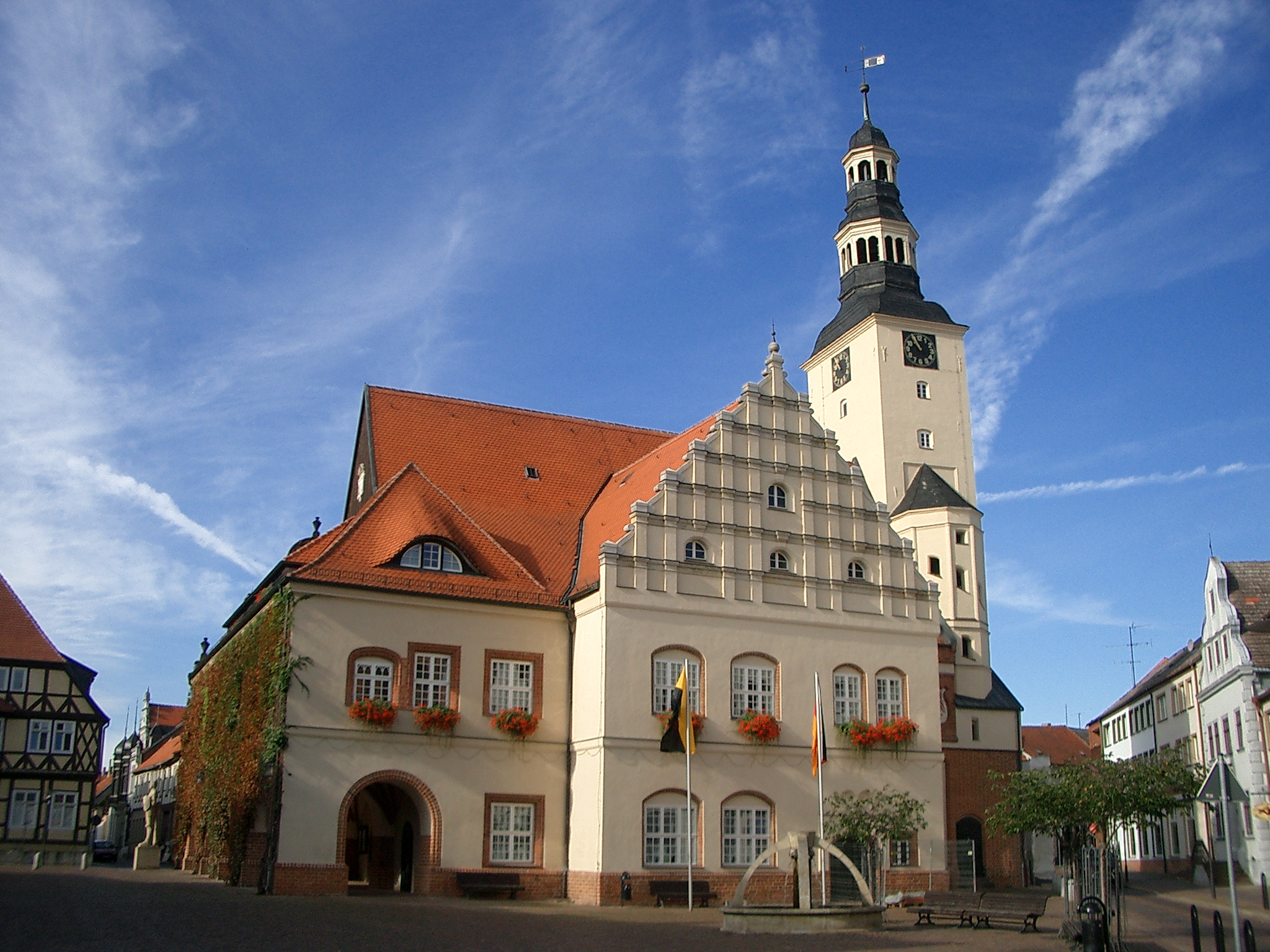
- Town hall

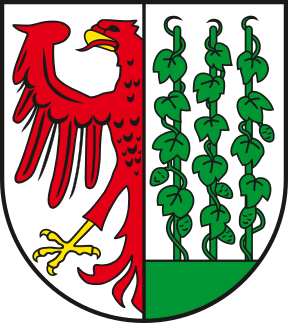
- Coat of arms

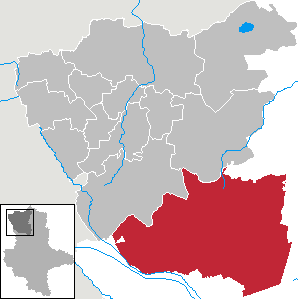
- Location of Gardelegen within Altmarkkreis Salzwedel district
- Interactive map of Gardelegen
- Location within Germany Location within Saxony-Anhalt
- Coordinates: 52°31′35″N 11°23′33″E
- Country: Germany
- State: Saxony-Anhalt
- District: Altmarkkreis Salzwedel

Government
  - Mayor (2022–29): Mandy Schumacher (SPD)

Area
  - Total: 632.43 km^{2} (244.18 sq mi)
- Elevation: 43 m (141 ft)

Population (2025-12-31)
  - Total: 21,661
  - Density: 34.250/km^{2} (88.708/sq mi)
- Time zone: UTC+01:00 (CET)
  - Summer (DST): UTC+02:00 (CEST)
- Postal codes: 39638, 39649
- Dialling codes: 03907, 039004, 039006, 039056, 039085, 039087, 039088
- Vehicle registration: SAW, GA, KLZ
- Website: www.gardelegen.de

Gardelegen (German pronunciation: [ˈɡaʁdəleːɡn̩]; Low German: Garlä) is a town in Saxony-Anhalt, Germany. It is situated on the right bank of the Milde, 20 miles west of Stendal, on the main line of the Hanover–Berlin rail line.

== History ==
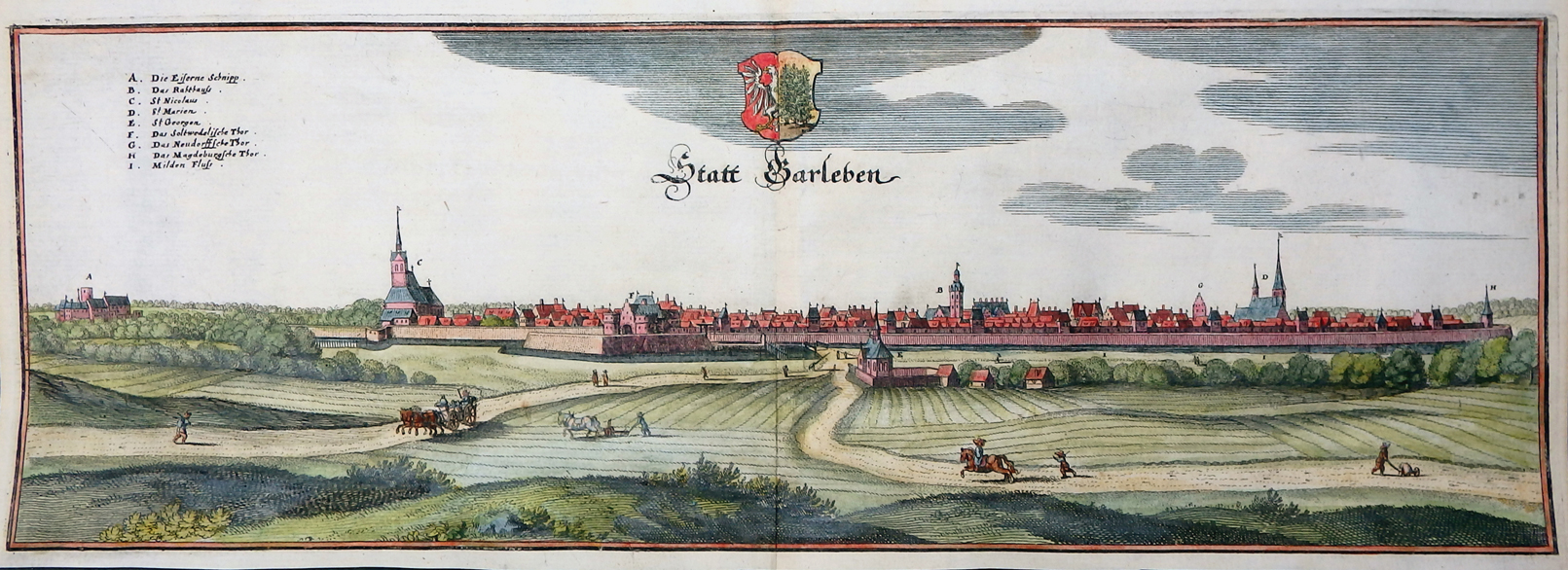
17th-century view of the town

Gardelegen has a Roman Catholic and three Evangelical churches, a hospital (founded in 1285), and a high school. There are considerable manufacturers, notably agricultural machinery and buttons, and its beer has a great reputation.

Gardelegen was founded in the 10th century (first named 1196). The castle Isenschnibbe was owned by the House of Alvensleben from 1378 until 1857. On the neighboring heath Margrave Louis I. of Brandenburg gained, in 1343, a victory over Otto the Mild of Brunswick. In 1358 Gardelegen became a member of the Hanseatic League. It suffered considerably in the Thirty Years' War, and in 1757 barely avoided being burned by the French. During World War I, Germany operated a special prisoner-of-war camp for ethnic Poles from the Russian Army, with the aim of subjecting them to propaganda and conscripting them into a planned German-controlled Polish army to fight against Russia (Poland was partitioned between Germany, Russia and Austria at the time). During the final stages of World War II, on 15 March 1945, 52 people lost their lives during an air raid. On 13 April 1945, the Isenschnibbe Barn at Gardelegen was the site of a massacre of more than 1,000 concentration camp inmates, many of them from Poland, the Soviet Union, France and from other countries, perpetrated by members of the SS, the Wehrmacht, the Volkssturm, other Nazi Organisations and local civilians. The majority of the murdered is unknown. The site of the massacre is now a memorial with a sign at the cemetery which reads:Gardelegen Military Cemetery. Here lie 1016 allied prisoners of war who were murdered by their captors. They were buried by citizens of Gardelegen, who are charged with responsibility that graves are for-ever kept as green as the memory of these unfortunates will be kept in the hearts of freedom-loving men everywhere.

At the height of the Cold War, a USAF RB-66 reconnaissance aircraft was shot down by Soviet fighters near the town on 10 March 1964. The aircraft's crew bailed out and was rescued and eventually handed back to West Berlin by Soviet forces.

After having incorporated 5 former municipalities in 2009, 6 in 2010, and 18 in 2011, Gardelegen is now Germany's third largest city by area, trailing only Berlin and Hamburg. It is actually the largest municipality in area in what was formerly East Germany. The population however is small, with only about 22,000.

== Geography ==
The town Gardelegen consists of Gardelegen proper and the following Ortschaften or municipal divisions:

- Algenstedt
- Berge
- Breitenfeld
- Dannefeld
- Estedt
- Hemstedt
- Hottendorf
- Jeggau
- Jeseritz
- Kloster Neuendorf
- Köckte
- Letzlingen
- Lindstedt
- Mieste
- Miesterhorst
- Peckfitz
- Potzehne
- Roxförde
- Sachau
- Schenkenhorst
- Seethen
- Sichau
- Solpke
- Wannefeld
- Wiepke
- Zichtau

Furthermore, the town Gardelegen contains the localities Ipse, Jävenitz, Jerchel, Kassieck, Lindenthal, Trüstedt, Weteritz, Zienau and Ziepel.

== Climate ==
Climate data for Gardelegen (1991–2020 normals)
Month	Jan	Feb	Mar	Apr	May	Jun	Jul	Aug	Sep	Oct	Nov	Dec	Year
Mean daily maximum °C (°F)	3.8 (38.8)	5.3 (41.5)	9.2 (48.6)	15.2 (59.4)	19.4 (66.9)	22.7 (72.9)	25.1 (77.2)	24.5 (76.1)	20.0 (68.0)	14.3 (57.7)	8.0 (46.4)	4.7 (40.5)	14.4 (57.9)
Daily mean °C (°F)	1.2 (34.2)	1.8 (35.2)	4.7 (40.5)	9.2 (48.6)	13.6 (56.5)	16.9 (62.4)	19.1 (66.4)	18.4 (65.1)	14.3 (57.7)	9.7 (49.5)	5.1 (41.2)	2.3 (36.1)	9.7 (49.5)
Mean daily minimum °C (°F)	−1.8 (28.8)	−1.7 (28.9)	0.1 (32.2)	2.7 (36.9)	6.7 (44.1)	10.1 (50.2)	12.4 (54.3)	11.9 (53.4)	8.6 (47.5)	5.3 (41.5)	2.0 (35.6)	−0.5 (31.1)	4.7 (40.5)
Average precipitation mm (inches)	44.7 (1.76)	32.1 (1.26)	38.9 (1.53)	31.1 (1.22)	48.5 (1.91)	51.4 (2.02)	64.9 (2.56)	53.8 (2.12)	44.0 (1.73)	45.5 (1.79)	38.6 (1.52)	44.5 (1.75)	536.1 (21.11)
Average precipitation days (≥ 1.0 mm)	16.3	14.3	15.4	11.9	12.6	12.8	14.1	13.0	11.6	14.3	15.6	16.8	168.5
Average snowy days (≥ 1.0 cm)	7.0	6.1	3.3	0.2	0	0	0	0	0	0	0.9	4.7	22.2
Average relative humidity (%)	86.2	82.0	77.5	70.3	68.8	69.1	69.3	71.2	77.6	83.9	88.3	87.7	77.7
Mean monthly sunshine hours	47.9	71.4	118.2	179.4	216.5	221.3	215.9	204.3	152.9	106.9	49.3	38.7	1,616.1
Source: World Meteorological Organization

== Sights ==
There are various well-preserved half-timbered houses in Main Street (Ernst-Thälmann-Straße) and Nicolaistraße as well as a part of the medieval city wall which deserve a visit. In the northern part of the historical centre, St. Georg is a sightworthy gothic chapel which was mentioned for the first time in 1362 as a part of a hospital. It was renovated and enlarged in 1734, and today it is used for exhibitions and concerts. In the Middle Ages, the hospital was outside the town, which was surrounded by moats and walls, as people with infectious diseases were treated there. Originally, Gardelegen had three gates when it was surrounded by a medieval town wall. Salzwedel Gate dating from 1565 is a well-preserved gate in the north, a part of Stendal Gate is left in the southeast but Magdeburg Gate in the southwest was demolished completely.

St. Nicolai Church dating from the 14th century was heavily damaged by bombs on 15 March 1945. The nave is still in ruins, and the tower was renovated. There are plans to transform the nave into a concert hall. St. Spiritus is a renaissance building dating from 1591 which belonged to a monastery that was mentioned for the first time in 1319. It was a hospital where sick and elderly people were looked after. St. Mary's Church was built around 1200 in a romantic style with five naves and enlarged in the 14th century, and the Town Hall is an impressive baroque structure which was built from 1526-1522.

== Gallery ==
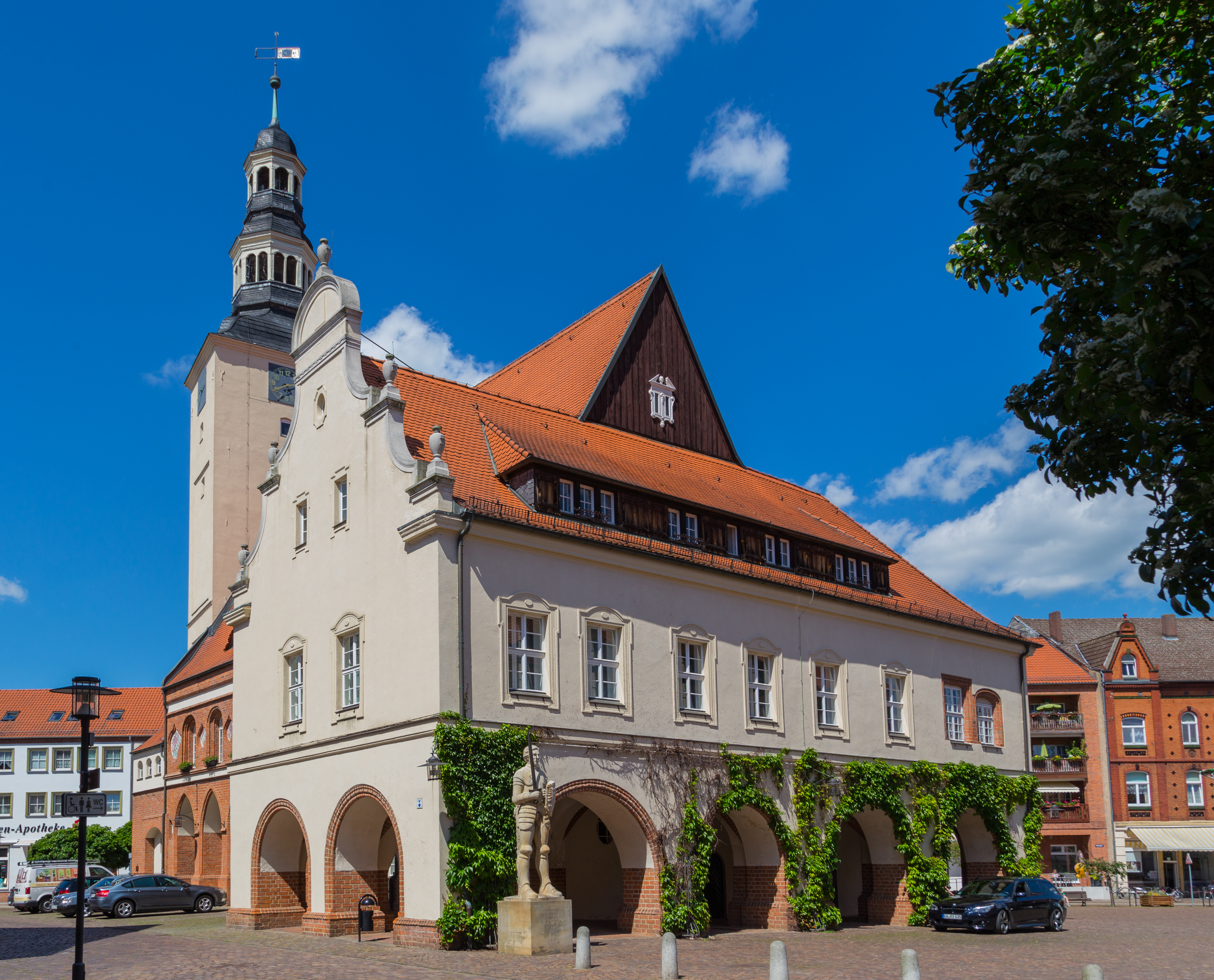
Town Hall

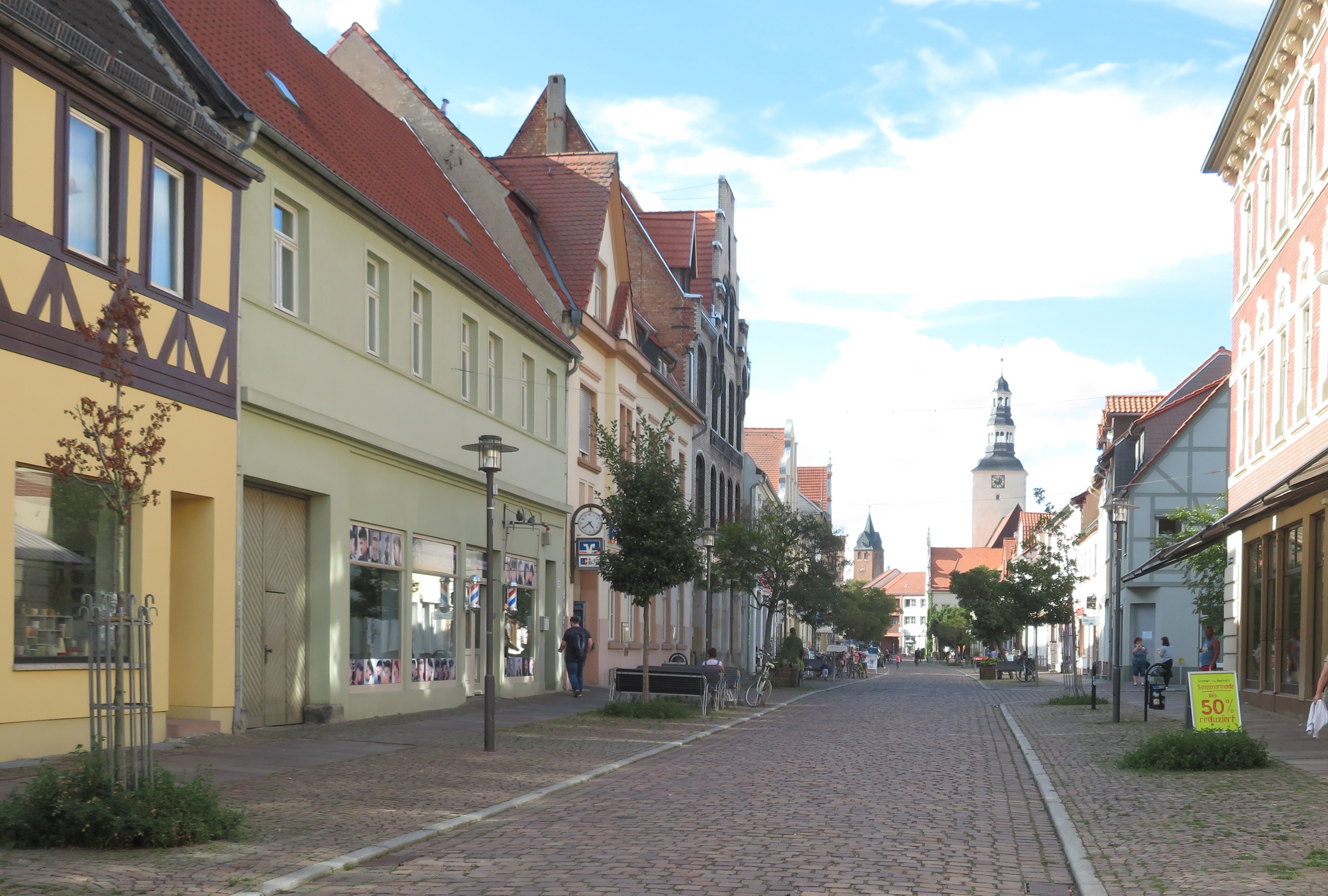
Main Street (Ernst-Thälmann-Straße)

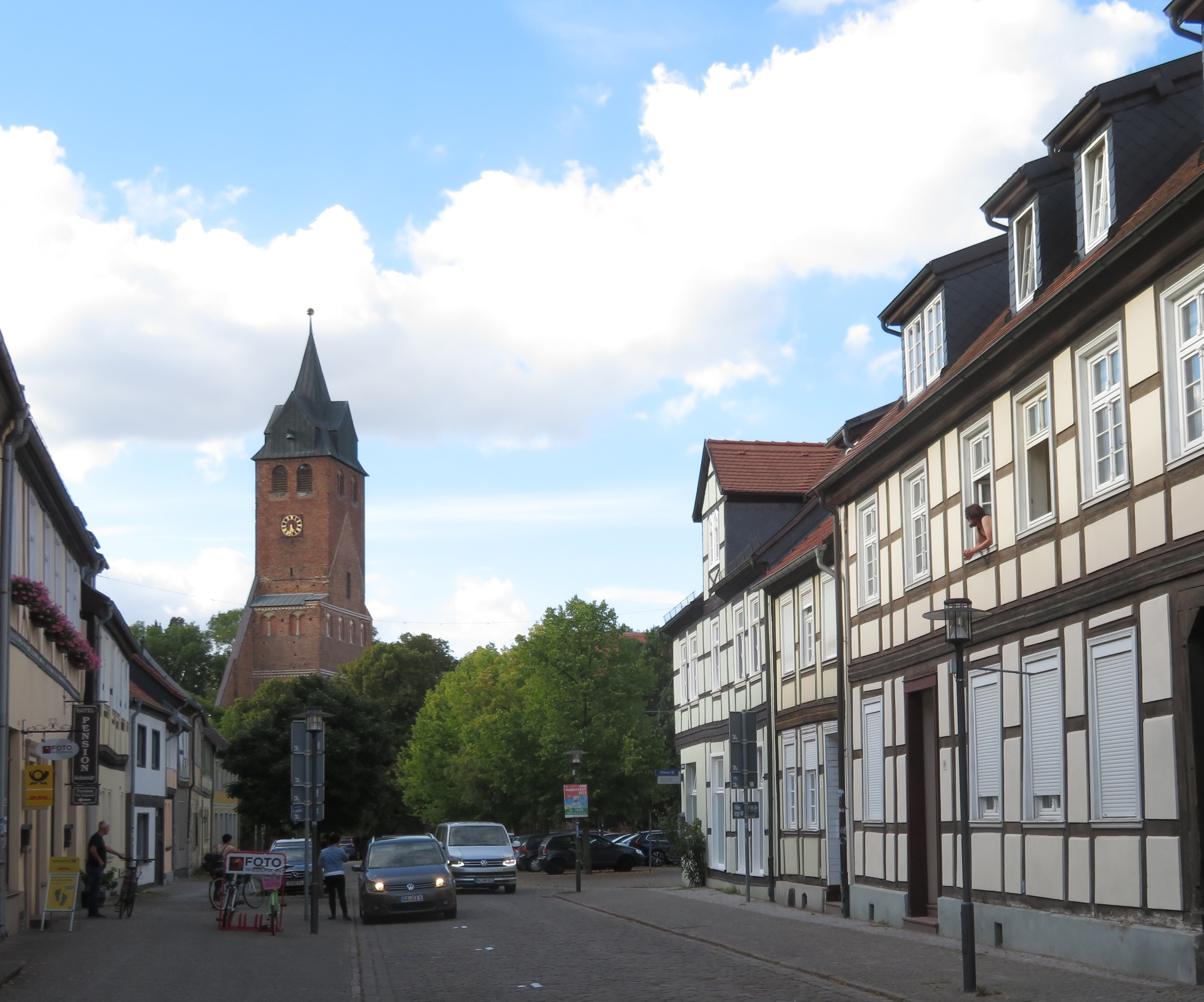
Nicolai Street and St. Nicolai Church

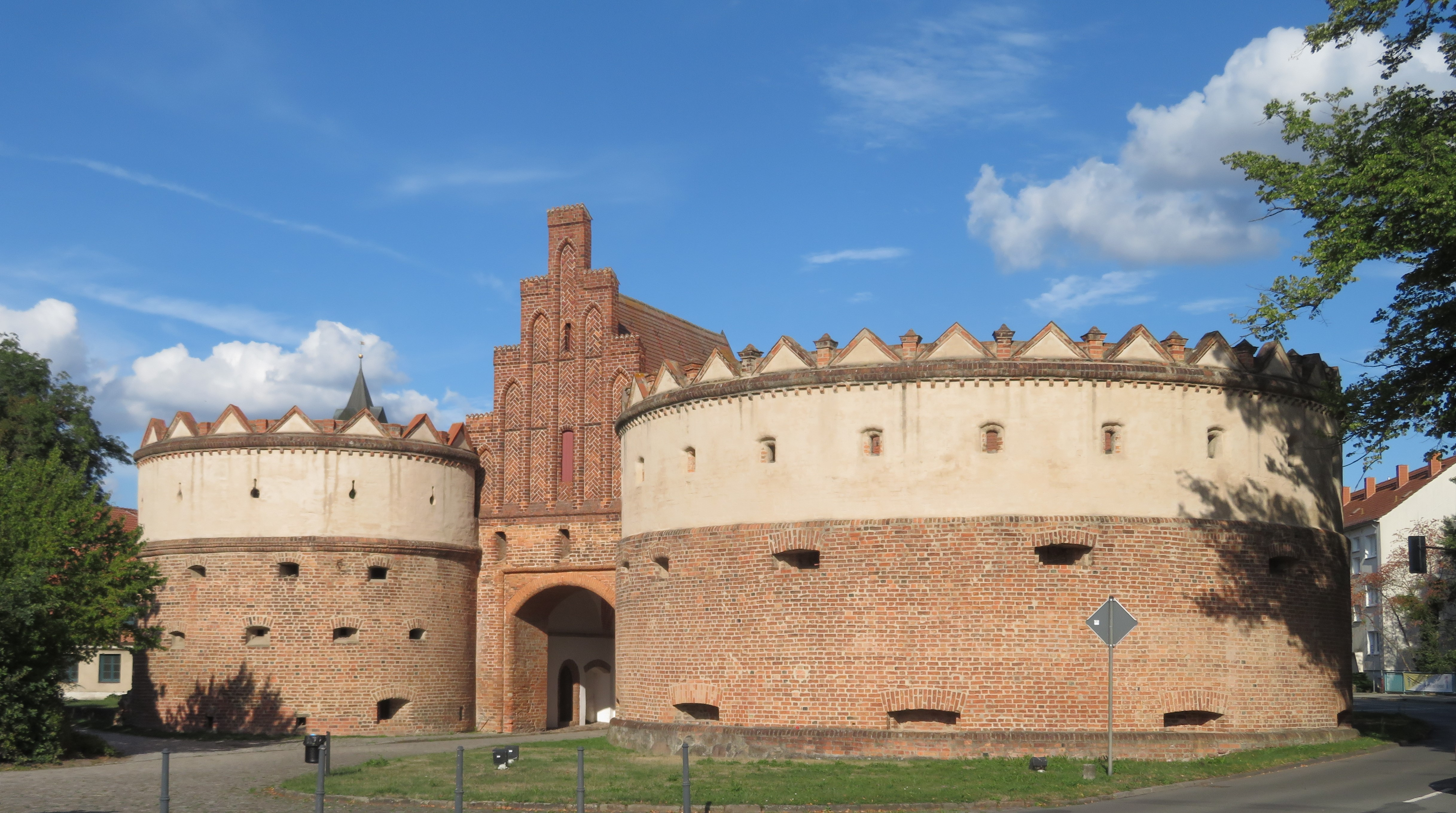
Medieval Salzwedel Gate

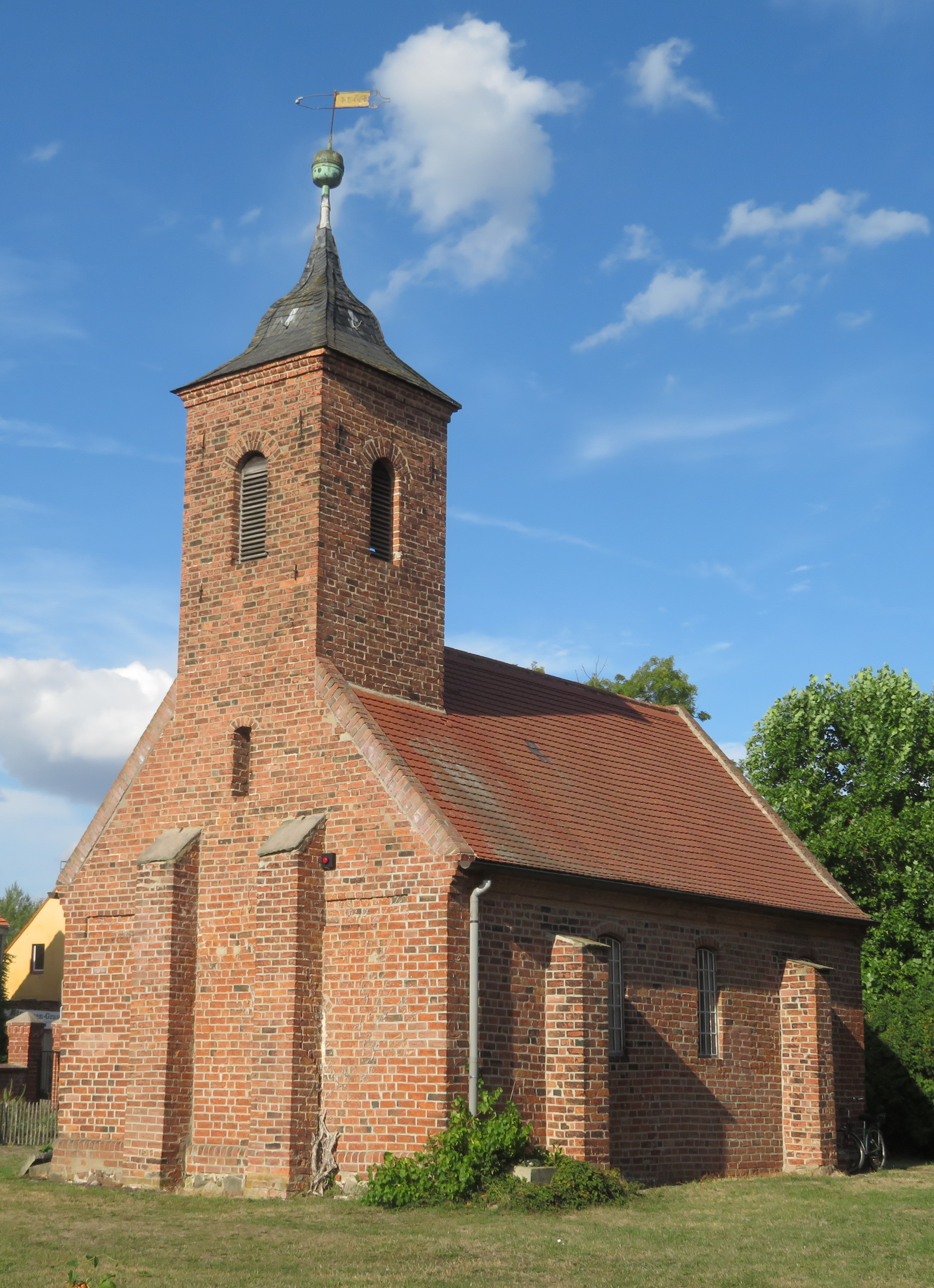
St. Georg's Chapel

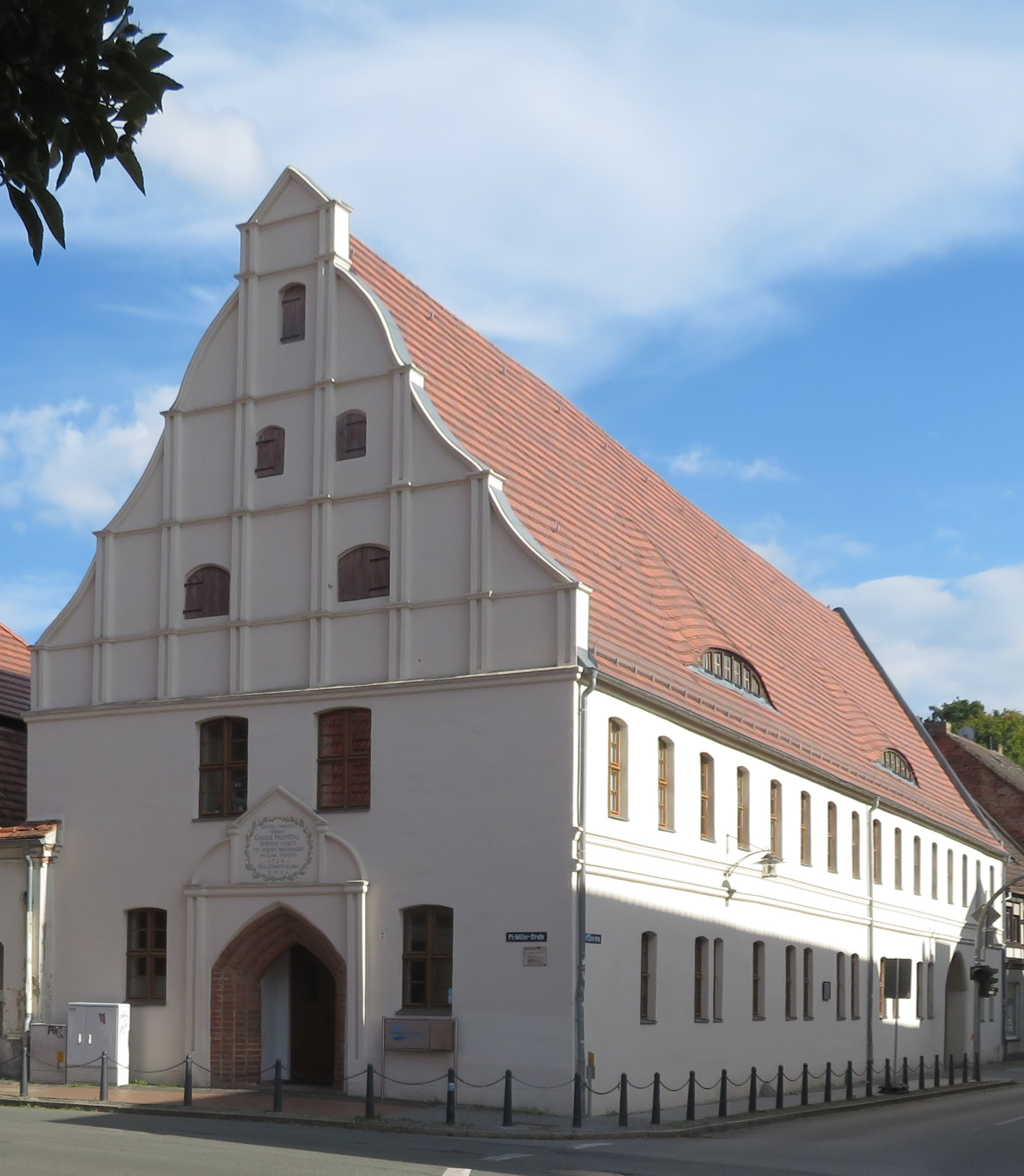
Former Hospital St. Spiritus

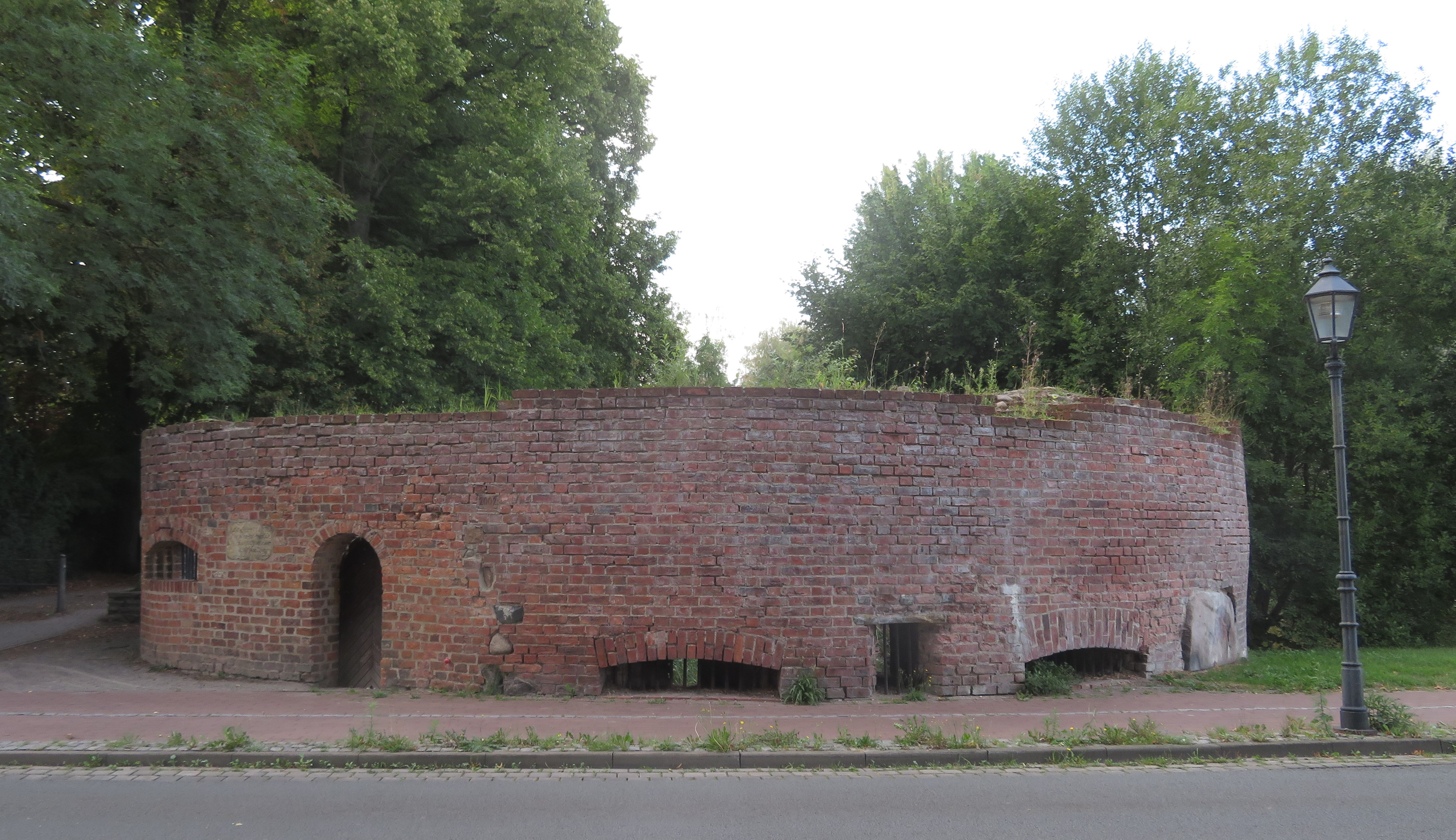
Medieval Stendal Gate

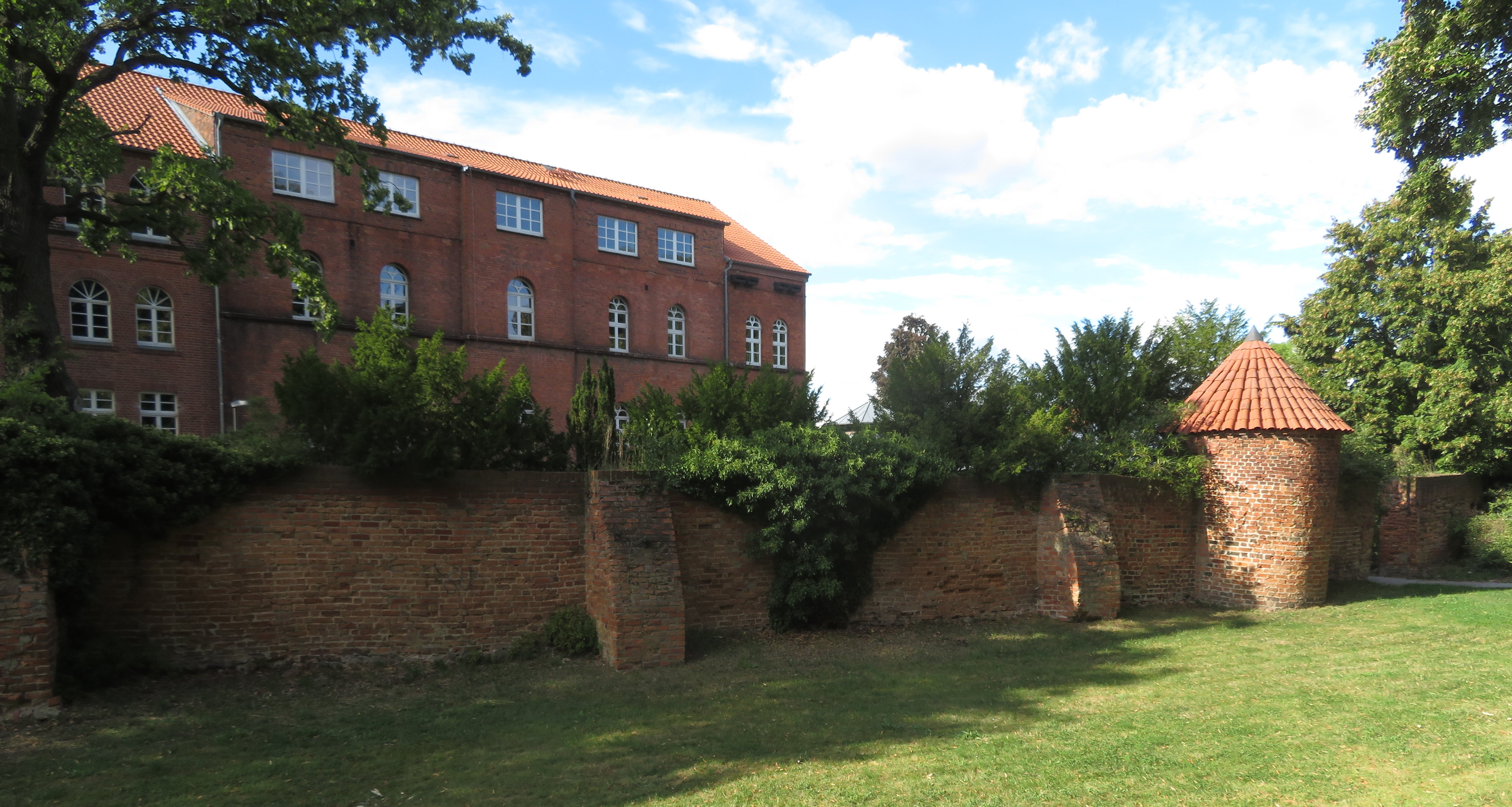
Medieval town wall

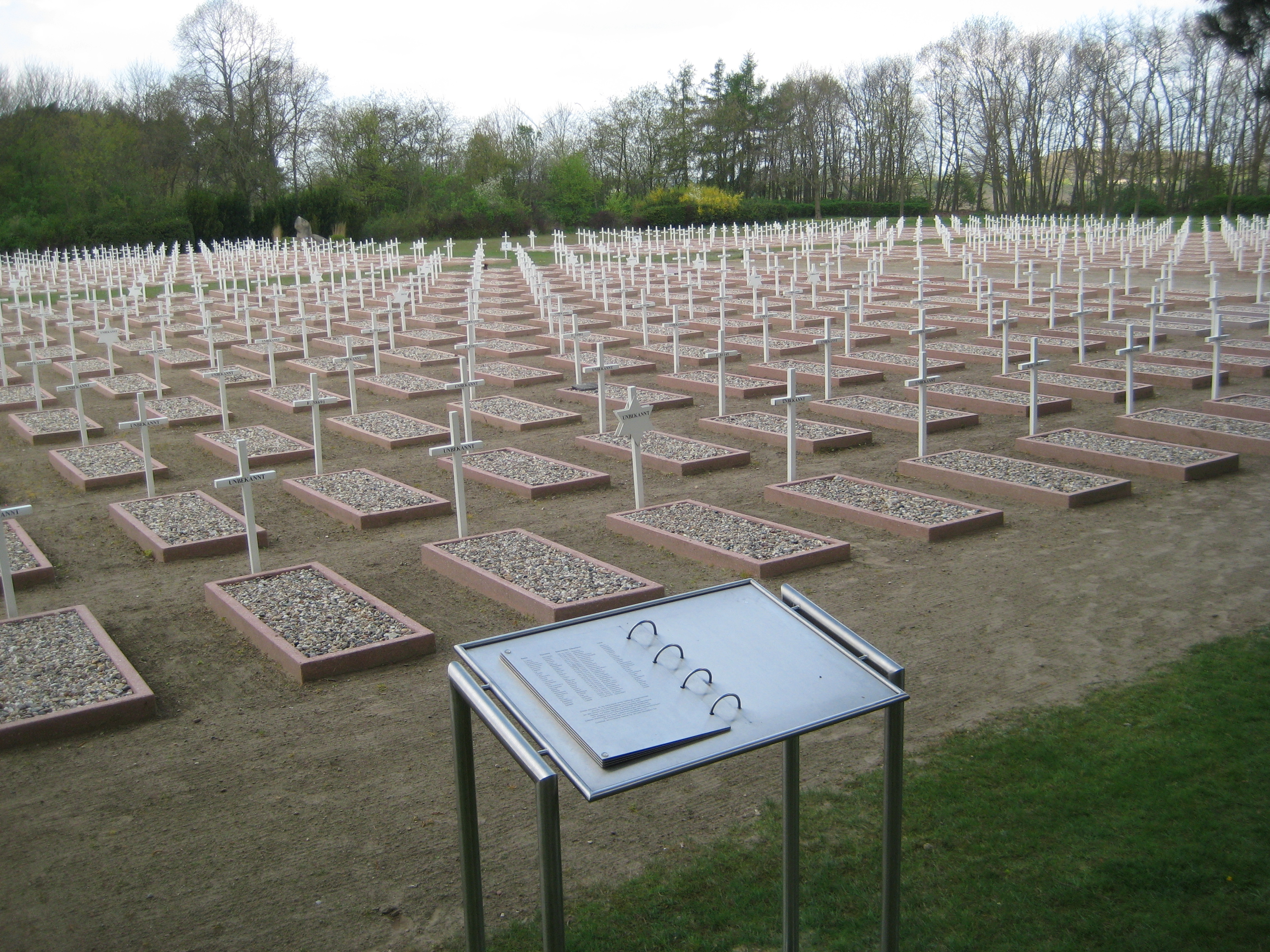
Gardelegen Military Cemetery

== Twin towns – sister cities ==
Gardelegen is twinned with:

- Darłowo, Poland
- Gifhorn, Germany
- Waltrop, Germany

== Notable people ==
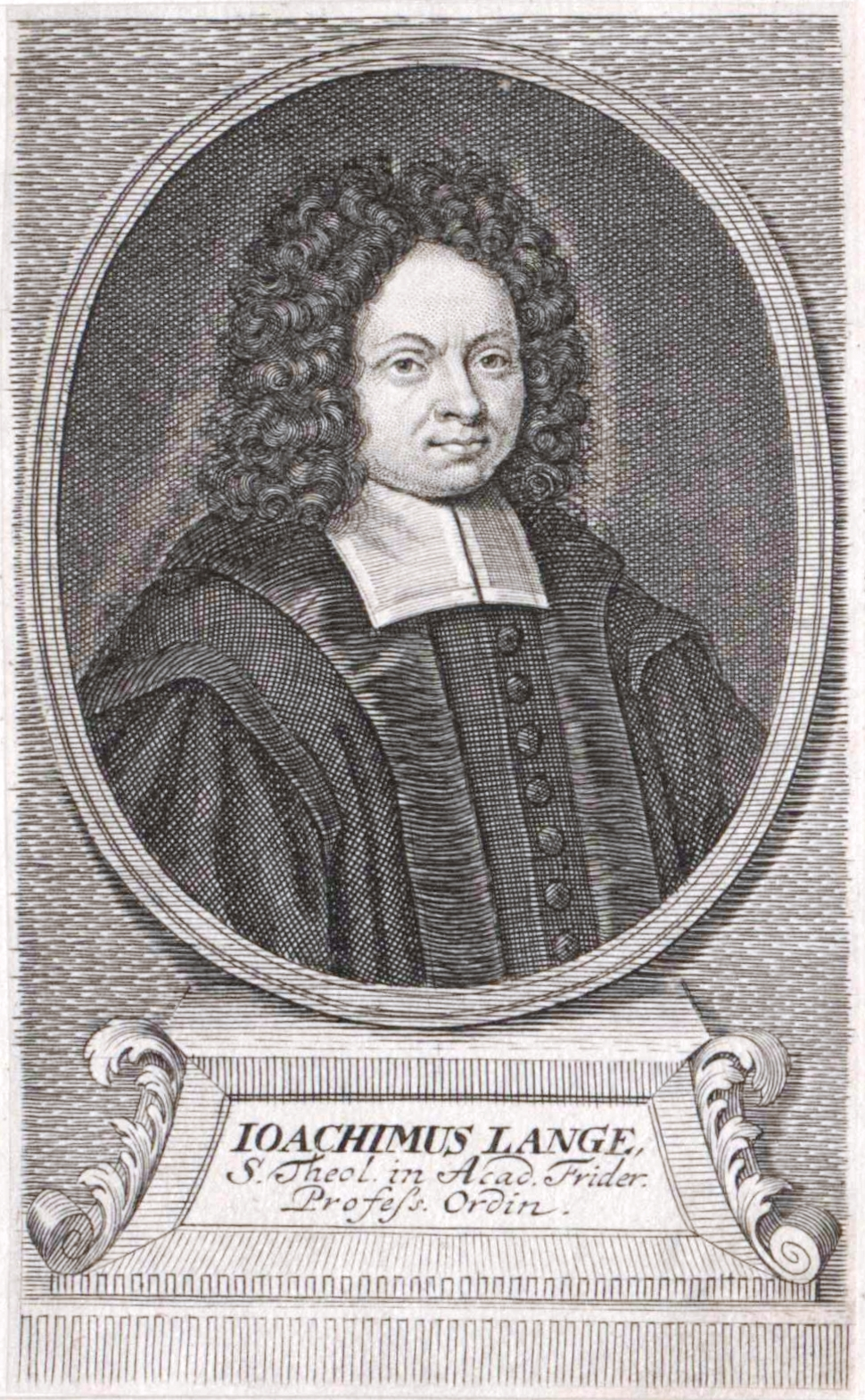
Joachim Lange around 1750

- Christian Francken (1550–1611), Jesuit and Unitarian theologian
- Joachim Lange (1670–1744), theologian
- Johann Wilhelm Weinmann (1683–1741), chemist and botanist
- Christoph August Tiedge (1752–1841), poet
- Otto Reutter (1870–1931), comedian, singer and actor
- Werner Preuss (1884–1919), officer
- Christa Stubnick (1933–2021), sprinter
- Raymond Hecht (born 1968), javelin thrower

=== Associated with the town ===
- Richard Sonnenfeldt (1923–2009), American engineer and author, grew up in Gardelegen. He was the chief U.S. interpreter at the Nuremberg Trial.
- Helmut Sonnenfeldt (1926–2012), American government official, grew up in Gardelegen. He was closely associated with Henry Kissinger.
