= Altmarkkreis Salzwedel =

- District
- Flag Coat of arms
- Coordinates: 52°41′N 11°13′E
- Country: Germany
- State: Saxony-Anhalt
- Capital: Salzwedel

Government
  - District admin.: Steve Kanitz (SPD)

Area
  - Total: 2,294.6 km^{2} (886.0 sq mi)

Population (31 December 2024)
  - Total: 79,980
  - Density: 34.86/km^{2} (90.28/sq mi)
- Time zone: UTC+01:00 (CET)
  - Summer (DST): UTC+02:00 (CEST)
- Vehicle registration: SAW, GA, KLZ
- Website: altmarkkreis-salzwedel.de

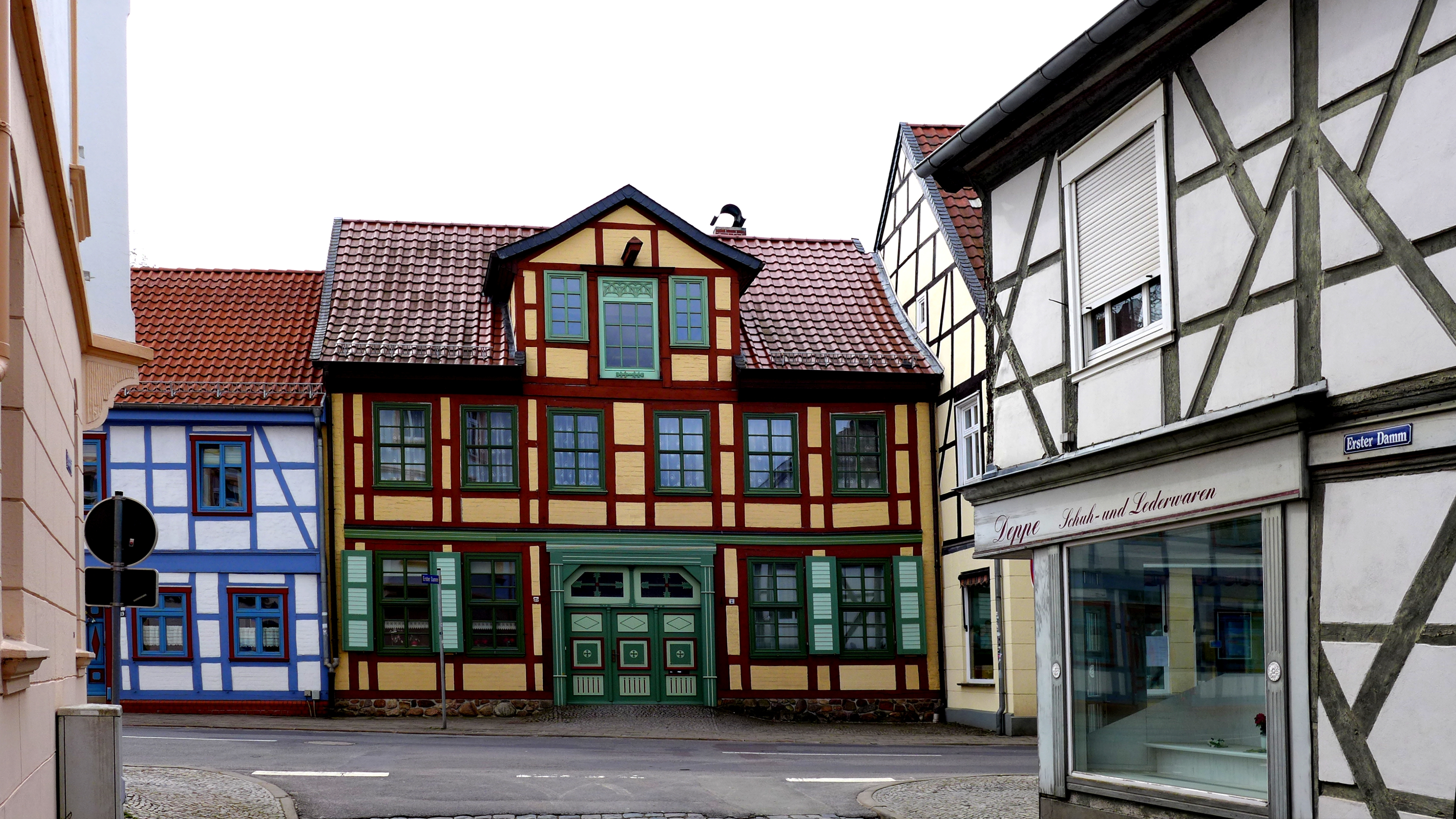
Salzwedel - Holzmarktstrasse

Altmarkkreis Salzwedel is a district in Saxony-Anhalt, Germany. It is bounded by (from the west and clockwise) the districts Gifhorn, Uelzen, Lüchow-Dannenberg in Lower Saxony, and the districts of Stendal and Börde (district).

== History ==
The Altmark is a historical region that covers the territory of this district as well as parts of the neighbouring district of Stendal. In the 10th century AD, it was the eastern border province of the Holy Roman Empire; castles were built here in order to move the borders eastwards. The Altmark was a swampy and heavily contested region for centuries. In the 12th century, many swamps were drained, and the strongholds became small towns. In the Late Middle Ages, many towns were members of the Hanseatic League. Due to the Thirty Years' War the Altmark was completely devastated in the 17th century. It never regained its importance and remains sparsely populated to date.

The district was established in 1994 by merging the former districts of Gardelegen, Klötze, Salzwedel and (partially) Osterburg.

== Geography ==
The area of the district is 2,294.6 km^{2} (886.0 sq mi). The Altmark is a plain countryside, which once was full of fens and ponds. Today it is mainly covered with forests and heaths. It is generally dry, although some swampy regions survived. The largest of those is the Drömling, a large wetland in the southwest, which is a nature park shared with the neighbouring Börde (district).

The largest lake of the district is the Arendsee (5.54 km^{2}); the town of Arendsee is named after this lake.

Along the northern and western border runs the European Green Belt, accompanied by the Eurovelo-route EV13 Iron Curtain Trail.

== Coat of arms ==
The coat of arms displays:

- The heraldic eagle of Brandenburg, which was also part of the arms of Salzwedel
- The lion of Lüneburg, since the town of Klötze belonged to the duchy of Brunswick-Lüneburg in medieval times
- The symbol of the Altmark, that was used during the 11th and 12th centuries

== Towns and municipalities ==
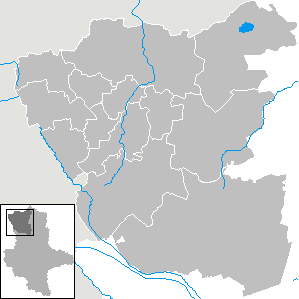
Clickable map of towns and municipalities in the district

The district Altmarkkreis Salzwedel consists of the following subdivisions:

Free towns
1. Arendsee
2. Gardelegen
3. Kalbe
4. Klötze
5. Salzwedel
Verbandsgemeinde

Beetzendorf-Diesdorf

1. Apenburg-Winterfeld
2. Beetzendorf^{1}
3. Dähre
4. Diesdorf
5. Jübar
6. Kuhfelde
7. Rohrberg
8. Wallstawe
