= Arendsee-Kalbe =

Coordinates: 52°45′N 11°27′E

Arendsee-Kalbe was a Verwaltungsgemeinschaft ("collective municipality") in the Altmarkkreis Salzwedel (district), in Saxony-Anhalt, Germany. It was situated east of Salzwedel, and north of Gardelegen. The seat of the Verwaltungsgemeinschaft was in Arendsee. It was disbanded on 1 January 2010.

The Verwaltungsgemeinschaft Arendsee-Kalbe consisted of the following municipalities:

1. Altmersleben
2. Arendsee
3. Brunau
4. Engersen
5. Güssefeld
6. Höwisch
7. Jeetze
8. Kahrstedt
9. Kakerbeck
10. Kalbe
11. Kläden
12. Kleinau
13. Leppin
14. Neuendorf am Damm
15. Neulingen
16. Packebusch
17. Sanne-Kerkuhn
18. Schrampe
19. Thielbeer
20. Vienau
21. Wernstedt
22. Winkelstedt
23. Ziemendorf
