= Salzwedel-Land =

Verwaltungsgemeinschaft in Altmarkkreis Salzwedel, Germany

Coordinates: 52°49′N 11°10′E

Salzwedel-Land was a Verwaltungsgemeinschaft ("collective municipality") in the Altmarkkreis Salzwedel (district), in Saxony-Anhalt, Germany. It was situated around Salzwedel, which was the seat of the Verwaltungsgemeinschaft, but not part of it. It was disbanded on 1 January 2011.

The Verwaltungsgemeinschaft Salzwedel-Land consisted of the following municipalities:

1. Badel
2. Fleetmark
3. Jeggeleben
4. Kuhfelde
5. Mechau
6. Rademin
7. Steinitz
8. Vissum
9. Wieblitz-Eversdorf
10. Zethlingen
