= Packebusch =

- Stadtteil of Kalbe
- Interactive map of Packebusch
- Location within Germany Location within Saxony-Anhalt
- Coordinates: 52°45′24″N 11°30′12″E
- Country: Germany
- State: Saxony-Anhalt
- District: Altmarkkreis Salzwedel
- Town: Kalbe

Area
  - Total: 13.86 km^{2} (5.35 sq mi)
- Elevation: 27 m (89 ft)

Population (2018-12-31)
  - Total: 251
  - Density: 18.1/km^{2} (46.9/sq mi)
- Time zone: UTC+01:00 (CET)
  - Summer (DST): UTC+02:00 (CEST)
- Postal codes: 39624
- Dialling codes: 039030
- Vehicle registration: SAW

Packebusch is a village and a former municipality in the district Altmarkkreis Salzwedel, in Saxony-Anhalt, Germany. Since 1 January 2010, it is part of the town Kalbe.

== Geography ==
Packebusch is an angerdorf alongside a road, with a church located on the central green. It resides in the center of Altmark on the edge of the conservation area Kalbescher Werder bei Vienau, about 20 km (12.4 mi.) south-east of the district capital Salzwedel.

The communities of Packebusch and Hagenau are part of the village.

== History ==
Packebusch is first mentioned in 1324 as Pokebusch, when Hans and Heinecke of the house Kröcher sold the Kalbe castle and the accompanying villages to Albrecht of the House of Alvensleben. Further mentions are recorded in 1464 as de kerke to Pakebusch, in 1473 as pakebusch, in 1541 as Backepusch, and in 1687 as Packebusch.

=== Etymology ===
Franz Mertens translated an older form of the name, backebusch, into Hochdeutsch Buchenbusch (beech bush). Beech woodland once used to encompass three sides of the village.

=== Mergers ===
On 25 July 1952 Packebusch was transferred from the district of Salzwedel to the now defunct authority of Kries Kalbe (Milde). On 1 July 1994 they were placed into the district of Altmarkkreis Salzwedel.

By the end of 2009 Packebusch, along with Hagengau (incorporated on 1 August 1973) formed an independent municipality. The municipality was a member of the administration partnership Arendsee-Kalbe and their last mayor was Otto Wienecke (* 1959).

As a result of a Gebietsänderungsvereinbarung (an agreement to change territories) the municipal councils of Kalbe (Milde) (on 25 June 2009), Brunau (12 May 2009), Engerson (2 June 2009), Jeetze (3 June 2009), Kakerbeck (25 June 2009), Packebusch (4 June 2009), and Vienau (14 May 2009) agreed to dissolve their municipalities and become entwined with the town of Kalbe (Milde). The application was accepted by the commune oversight committee and came into force on 1 January 2010.

Following the application becoming law, the independent community of Packebusch along with its constituent communities became a part of the new town of Kalbe. In the new municipality and current locality of Packbusch, a council was formed with seven members including the local mayor.

=== Population Development ===
Year	Population	Year	Population	Year	Population	Year	Population	Year	Population	Year	Population
1734	246	1818	181	1892	492	1925	579	1993	475	2017	246
1774	199	1840	318	1895	548	1939	526	2006	395	2018	251
1789	174	1864	443	1900	543	1946	811	2008	380		
1798	264	1871	449	1905	580	1971	517	2015	255		
1801	202	1885	488	1910	602	1981	543	2016	252		

== Religion ==
The evangelical congregation and parish of Packebusch belong to the parish area of Fleetmark-Jeetze, which itself comes under the church district of Salzwedel in Propstsprengel Stendal-Magdeburg, park of the Evangelical Church in Central Germany. In 1903, the communities of Packebusch, Hagenau, and Boock belonged to the congregation.

== Culture and Sights ==
=== Buildings ===
- The protestant church of Packebusch is a stately, late-romanesque fieldstone hall church with a west cross tower from 1900. According to the plans of the district architect Pflughaupt in 1865, in the course of an extensive reconstruction of the church the square choir was demolished, the nave was extended to the east, the entrance was moved from the south to the west side, a polygonal apse was built in, the eaves were raised, a round-arched frieze was added, and a large round-arched window was inserted. In 1972 the church was renovated.
- There are also half-timbered houses in the typical style of the Altmark and old head lime trees in the Dorfstraße. As remnants from the time of clay and loam mining, the remaining holes are now used as a biotope. Around a bathing pond there is a local recreation area with a campground.

=== Memorials ===
- A burial place in the local cemetery exists for a named Polish man, who was deported to Germany during the Second World War and became a victim of forced labour.
- In Packebusch there is a monument in front of the church for the fallen of the First and Second World War.

== Economy and Infrastructure ==
=== Official Institutions ===
- Village community centre of Packebusch

=== Transport ===
The railway station Brunau-Packebusch, located southwest of the village, is on the Stendal-Uelzen railway line. The federal highway 190 is located about 15 kilometers away near Arendsee.

== Notable people ==
- Bernd Sennecke (* 7. Februar 1950), Politician (CDU) and member of the state government for Saxony-Anhalt
- Friedrich-Wilhelm Ulrich (* 20. Oktober 1953), Rower, Olympic Champion in 1976 and 1980 with Steuermann
- Emil Schnell (* 10. November 1953), last Minister for Post and Telecommunications of the GDR and MdB
- Hans-Jörg Krause (* 28. Januar 1954), Politician (Die Linke) and member of the state government for Saxony-Anhalt
