= Salzwedel (disambiguation) =

Salzwedel is a town in Saxony-Anhalt, Germany. It may also refer to:

Places in Germany

- Salzwedel station in Salzwedel
- Salzwedel–Dannenberg railway, a defunct line between Salzwedel and Dannenberg
- Salzwedel Dumme, tributary of the River Jeetzel in Saxony-Anhalt, Germany
- Salzwedel-Land, defunct "collective municipality" in Saxony-Anhalt, Germany
- Altmarkkreis Salzwedel, district in Saxony-Anhalt, Germany

Surname

- Conrad II of Salzwedel (died 1241), German nobleman
- Dave Salzwedel (born 1968), American football player
- Heiko Salzwedel (1957–2021), German cycling coach
- Jack Salzwedel, chairman and CEO of American Family Insurance
- Lutgard of Salzwedel (1110–1152), Danish Queen consort
- Senno Salzwedel (born 1959), German weightlifter
