= Badel =

Badel may refer to:

- Badel, Germany, a village in Germany
- Badel, Somalia, a village in Somalia
- Alan Badel, an English actor
- Sarah Badel, an English actress
- RK Badel 1862 Zagreb, an old name for the Croatian handball club RK Zagreb
- Badel 1862, a Croatian beverage producer
- Alternative spelling of Bedel in Bedel Pass
