= Arendsee (lake) =

Lake in Germany

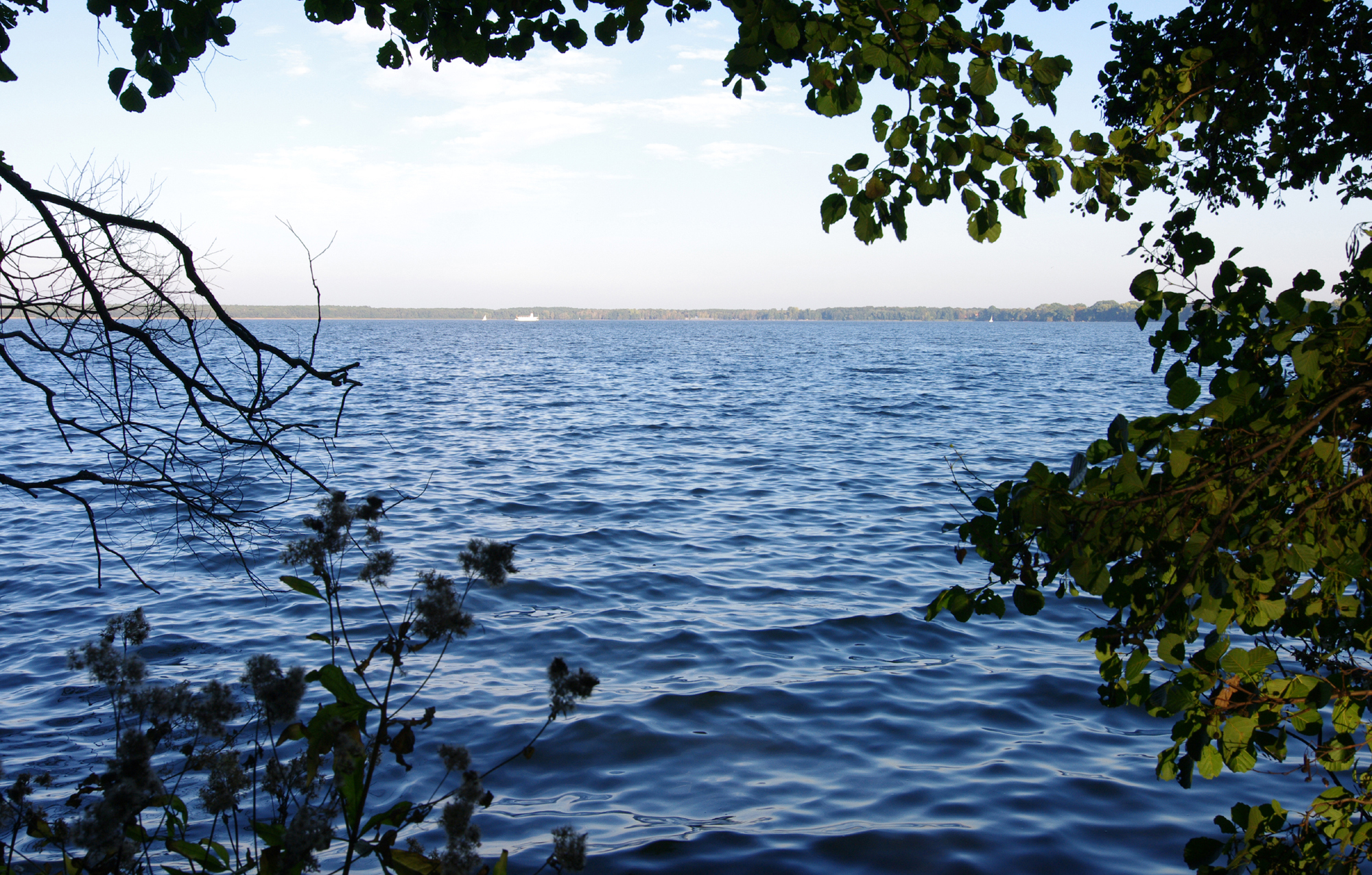

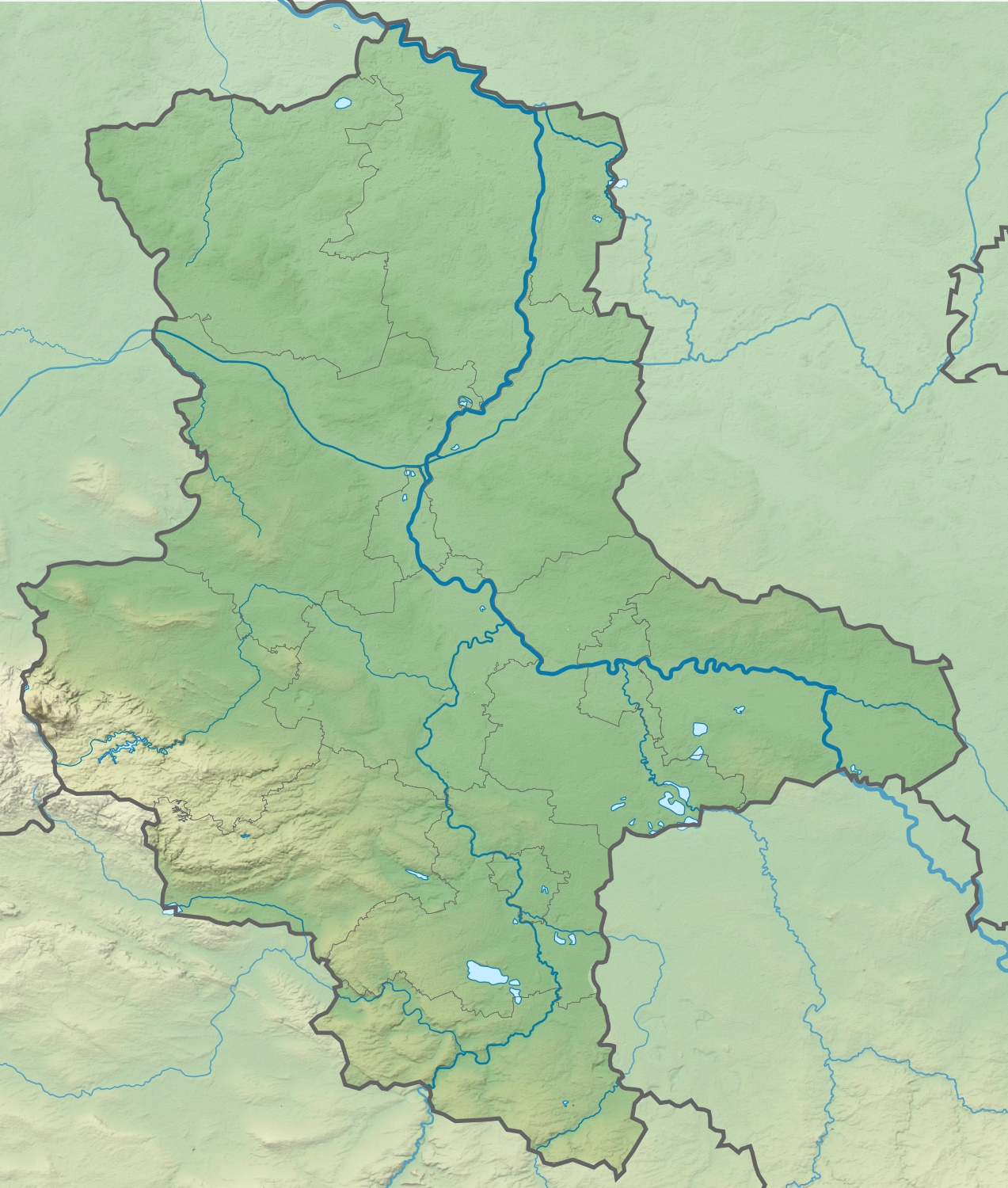
- Location within Saxony-Anhalt Location within Germany
- Location: Saxony-Anhalt
- Coordinates: 52°53′21″N 11°28′27″E
- Basin countries: Germany
- Surface area: 5.14 km^{2} (1.98 sq mi)
- Average depth: 29 m (95 ft)
- Max. depth: 50 m (160 ft)
- Residence time: 100 years
- Surface elevation: 23.3 m (76 ft)
- Settlements: Arendsee, Schrampe

The Lake Arend (German: Arendsee, pronounced [ˈaːʁɛntˌzeː]) is a natural lake in the Altmark region, northern Saxony-Anhalt, Germany. It is 23.3 m above sea level, and its area is 5.14 km^{2}, its depth nearly 50 m. It is the largest and deepest natural lake in Saxony-Anhalt.

The lake lies on top of a salt dome and developed by repeated caving-in events that continued into historical time; at the end of the 19th century it was believed to have been created by an earthquake in 815 AD. Hydrologically, the lake is more or less isolated with only a small artificial outflow connecting with the Elbe river via the river Jeetzel. The water body (0.147 bill. m^{3}) only changes every 100 years. The town Arendsee and the municipality Schrampe are situated on its shores.
