= Johannes Praetorius (historian) =

German writer and historian

Johannes Praetorius (latinization of Hans Schultze, also called Praetorius Zeitlingensis to differentiate him from others with the same pen name; October 22, 1630 – October 25, 1680) was a German writer and historian.

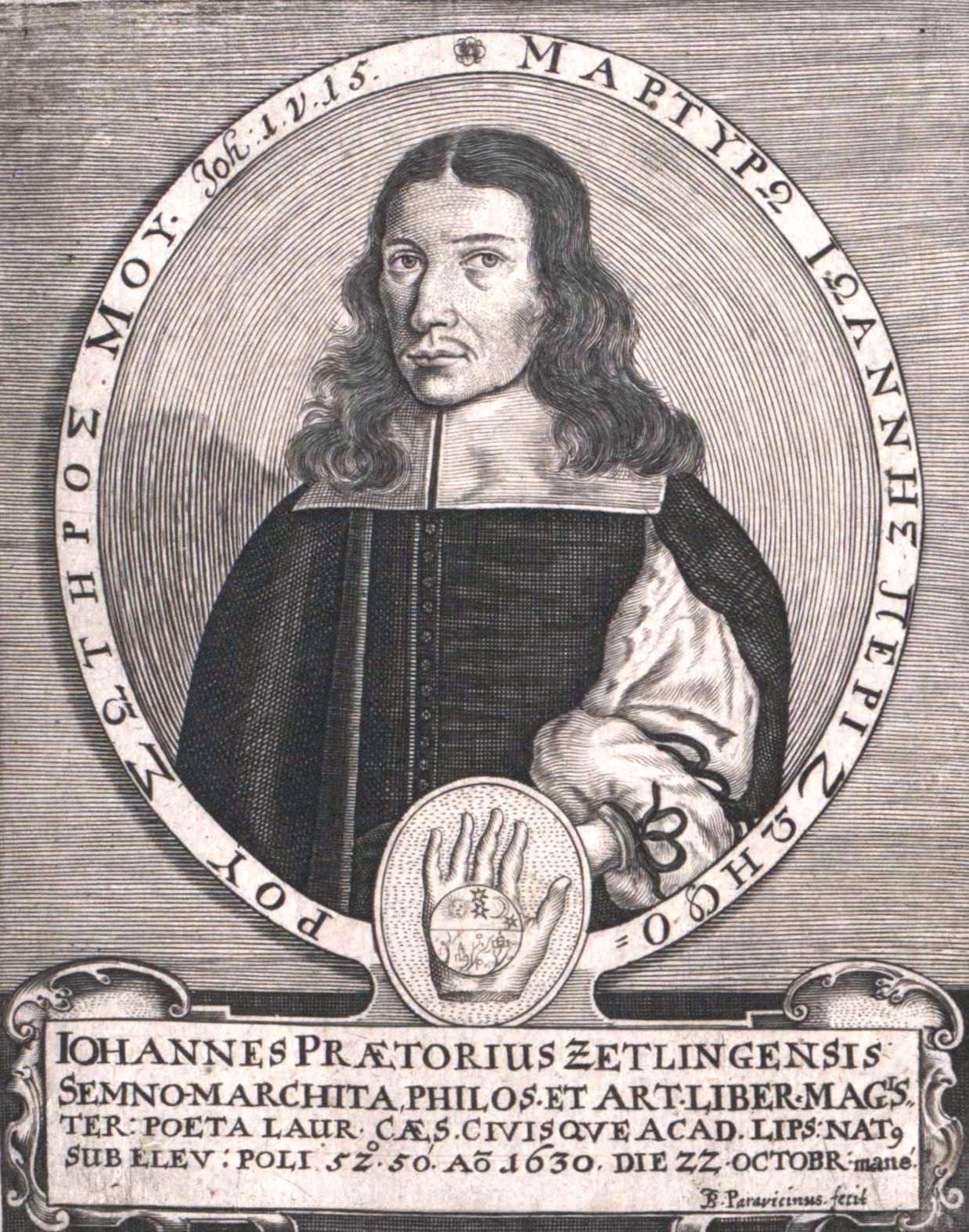
Johann Praetorius 1630

Born in Zethlingen, Brandenburg, Praetorius attended school in Salzwedel and at the Gymnasium in Halle (Saale), then enrolled at the University of Leipzig in Saxony, where he studied the natural sciences and obtained the Magister degree in 1653. He remained affiliated with the university until his death, studying texts at the Paulinum.

Praetorius occasionally gave lectures, but spent the bulk of his time writing and compiling literary works, including compendia of fairy tales and legends. He is well known for collecting folk tales of the Rübezahl.

== Works ==
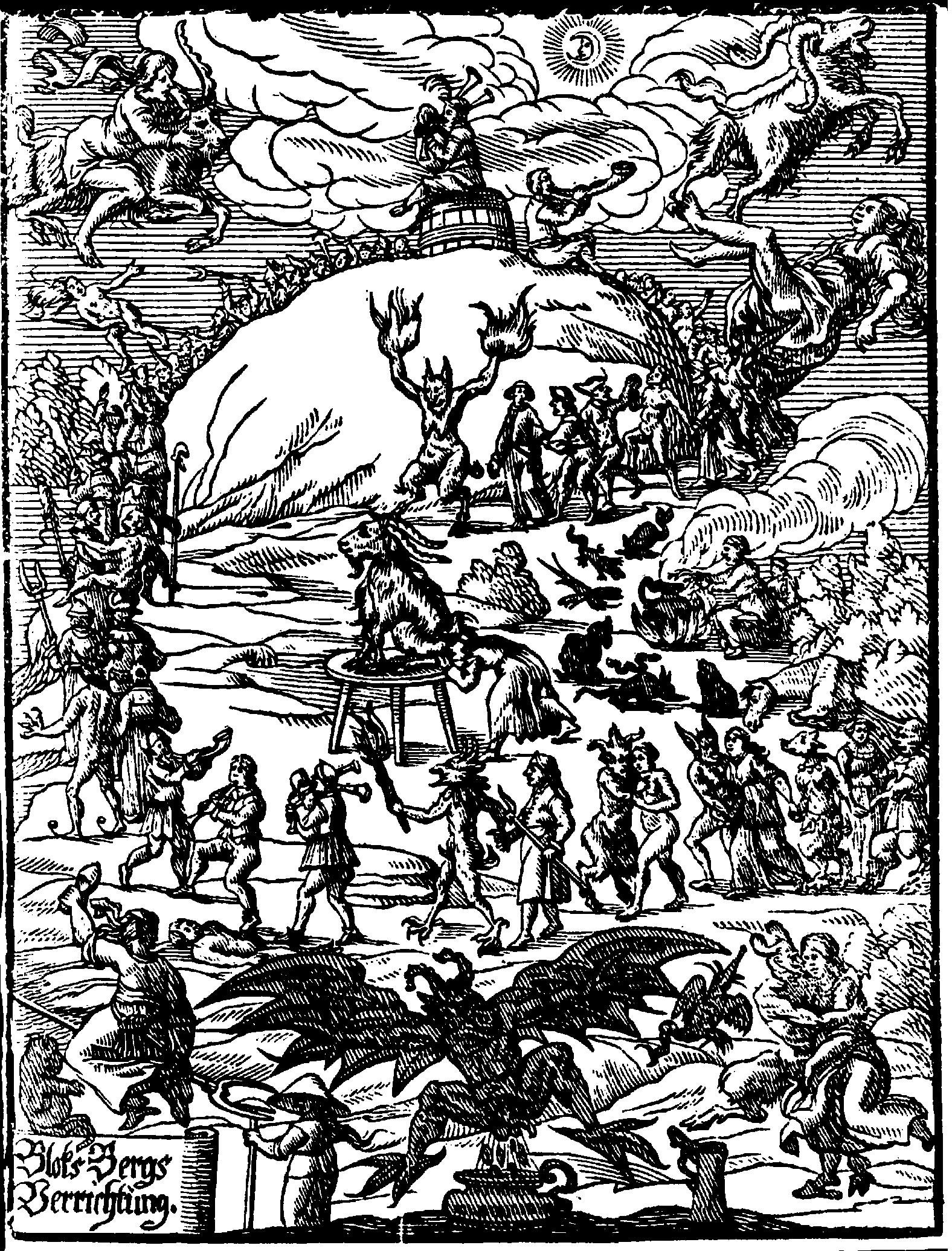
Witches' Sabbath – Johannes Praetorius: Blockes-Berges Verrichtung, Leipzig, 1668.

- Daemonologia Rubinzalii … Ein ausführlicher Bericht von … dem Rübezahl. Leipzig 1662.
- Catastrophe Muhammetica: Oder das Endliche Valet, und Schändliche Nativität des gantzen und nunmehr vergänglichen Türckischen Reichs: aus ziemlich vielen so wohl geistlichen Prophezeyungen als weltlichen Weissagungen ... an den Tag gegeben. Leipzig 1664. (Digital copy)
- Iudiciolum Asteriae oder Der mittägliche Strauss-Stern, so sich im Außgange des 1664. Jahrs nach Christi Geburt, im Monat Decemb. am 3. 4. 5. 12. und 18. gegen Süden früe Morgens, erschrecklich hat sehen lassen … 1664 (Digital copy).
- Anthropodemus Plutonicus, das ist, Eine Neue Weltbeschreibung. Magdeburg 1666.
- Storchs und Schwalben Winter-Qvartier. Frankfurt am Main, Leipzig 1676.
- Blockes-Berges Verrichtung oder ausführlicher geographischer Bericht von den hohen trefflich alt- und berühmten Blockes-Berge: ingleichen von der Hexenfahrt und Zauber-Sabbathe, so auff solchen Berge die Unholden aus gantz Teutschland Jährlich den 1. Maij in Sanct-Walpurgis-Nachte anstellen sollen; Aus vielen Autoribus abgefasset und mit schönen Raritäten angeschmücket sampt zugehörigen Figuren; Nebenst einen Appendice vom Blockes-Berge wie auch des Alten Reinsteins und der Baumans Höle am Hartz. Scheibe, Leipzig; Arnst, Frankfurt am Main 1668.

== Literature ==
- Gerhard Dünnhaupt: Chronogramme und Kryptonyme: Geheime Schlüssel zur Datierung und Autorschaft der Werke des Polyhistors Johannes Praetorius. In: Philobiblon. 21, 1977, S. 130–135.
- Gerhard Dünnhaupt: Johann Praetorius (1630-1680). In: Personalbibliographien zu den Drucken des Barock. Vol. 5. Hiersemann, Stuttgart 1991, ISBN 3-7772-9133-1, S. 3145–3193. (List of works and literature)
- Ferdinand van Ingen: Das Geschäft mit dem Berggeist. In: Chloe. 7, 1988, S. 361–380.
- Stefan Jordan (2001). "Praetorius, Johannes". Neue Deutsche Biographie (in German). Vol. 20. Berlin: Duncker & Humblot. pp. 667–668. (full text online).
- Gerhild Scholz Williams: Ways of Knowing in Early Modern Germany. Johannes Praetorius as a Witness to his Time. Ashgate, Burlington VT 2006.
- Friedrich Zarncke (1888). "Praetorius, Johannes (Dichter)" . Allgemeine Deutsche Biographie (in German). Vol. 26. Leipzig: Duncker & Humblot. pp. 520–529.
