= Salzwedel station =

Railway station in Salzwedel, Germany

Salzwedel
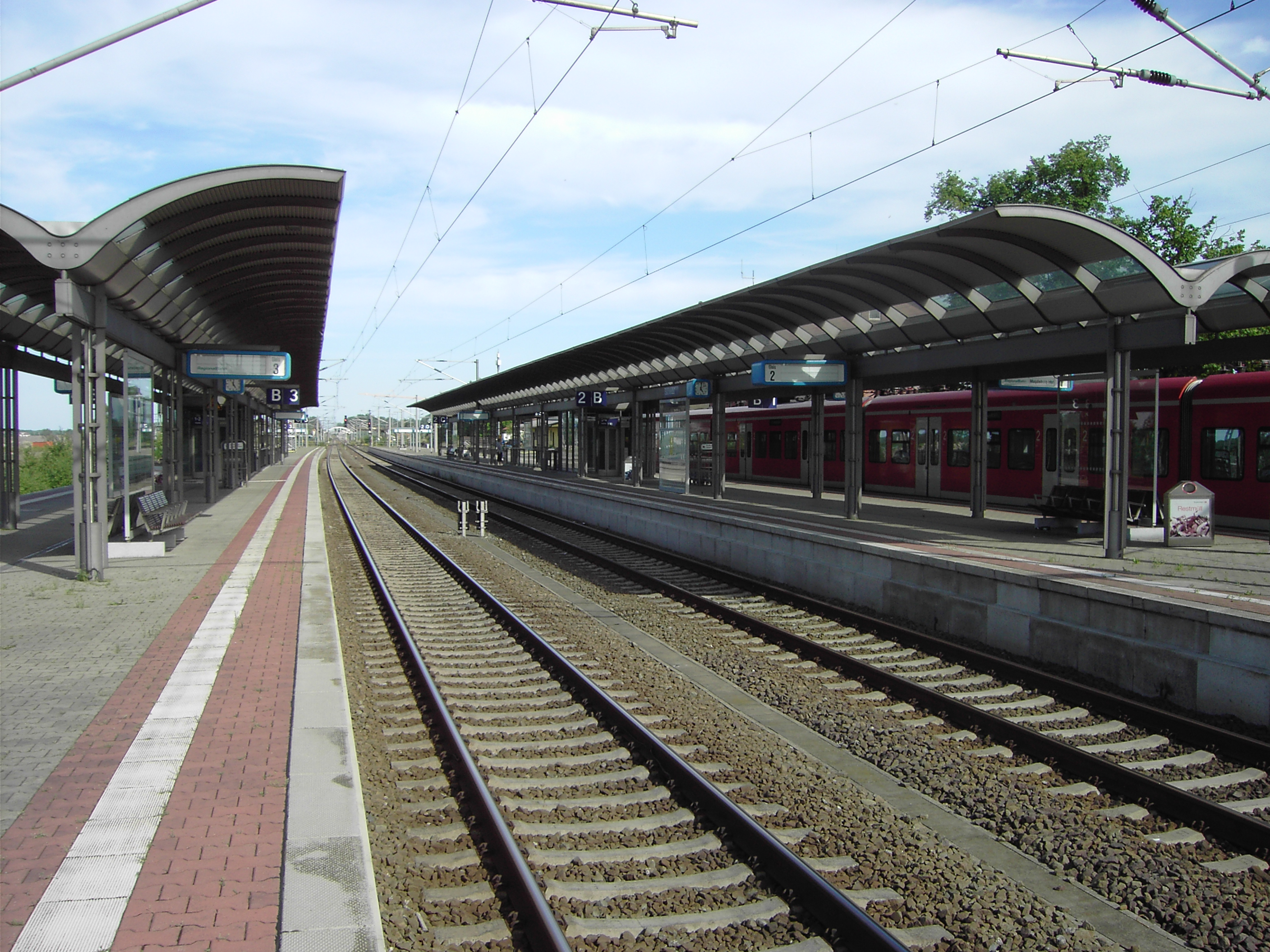
- View over the platforms

General information
- Location: Bahnhofstr. 7, Salzwedel, Saxony-Anhalt; Germany
- Coordinates: 52°51′29″N 11°9′42″E
- Owner: DB Netz
- Operator: DB Station&Service
- Lines: Stendal–Uelzen railway (KBS 305)
- Platforms: 4

Construction
- Accessible: Yes

Other information
- Station code: 5487
- DS100 code: LSW
- IBNR: 8010310
- Category: 4
- Website: www.bahnhof.de

History
- Opened: 1870

Services
Preceding station	DB Fernverkehr	Following station
Uelzen towards Hamburg-Altona	IC 57	Stendal Hbf towards Magdeburg Hbf
Preceding station	DB Regio Südost	Following station
Schnega towards Uelzen	RE 20	Hohenwulsch towards Magdeburg Hbf
Location
- Location within Saxony-Anhalt

Salzwedel station is the station of the district town of Salzwedel in Altmark in the German state of Saxony-Anhalt. Until 2004, it was a railway junction, but as a result of the closure of nearly all branch lines it has lost most of its importance. Only one railway line still runs through Salzwedel.

== History ==
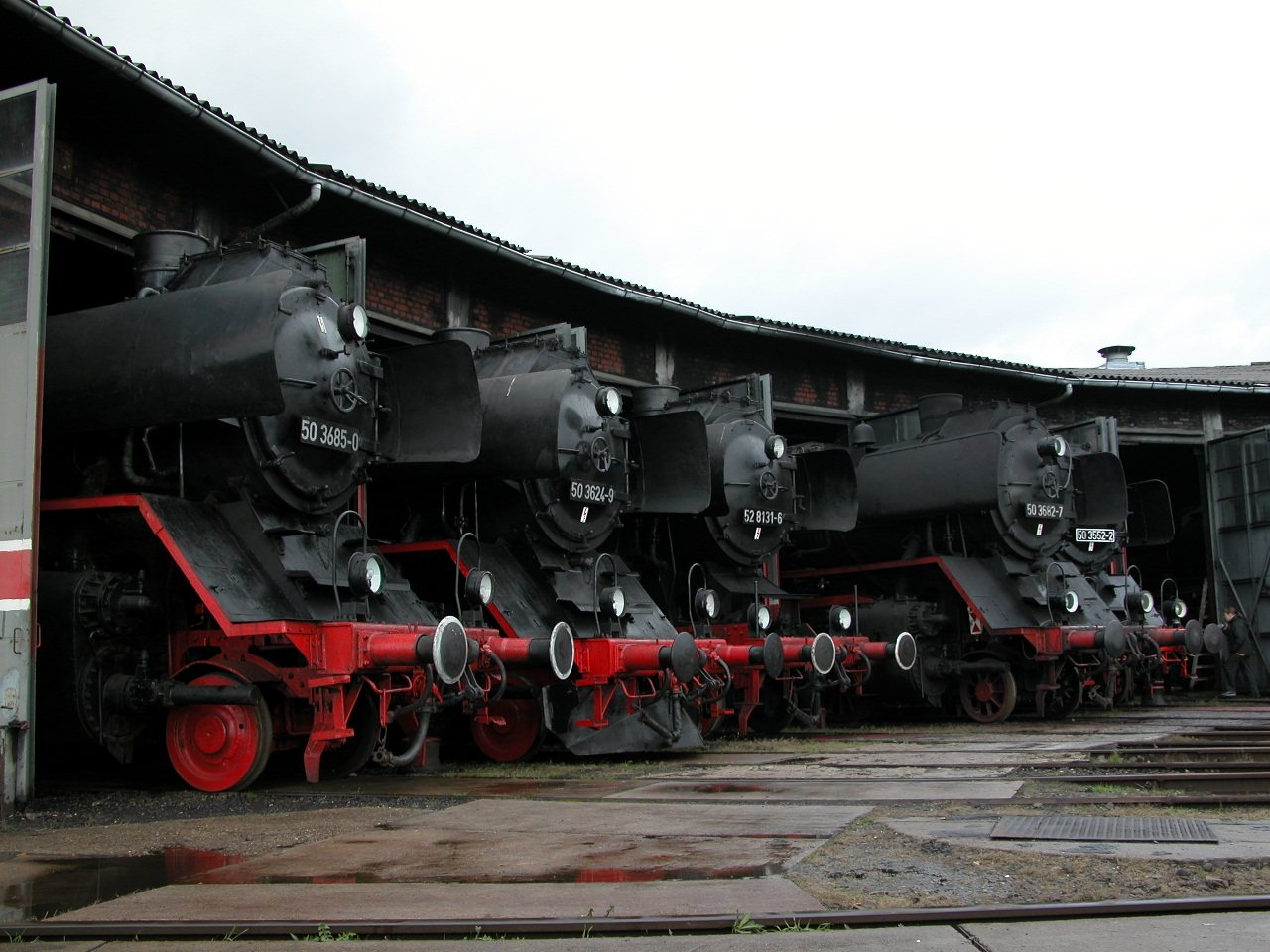
The former locomotive depot now houses a railway museum

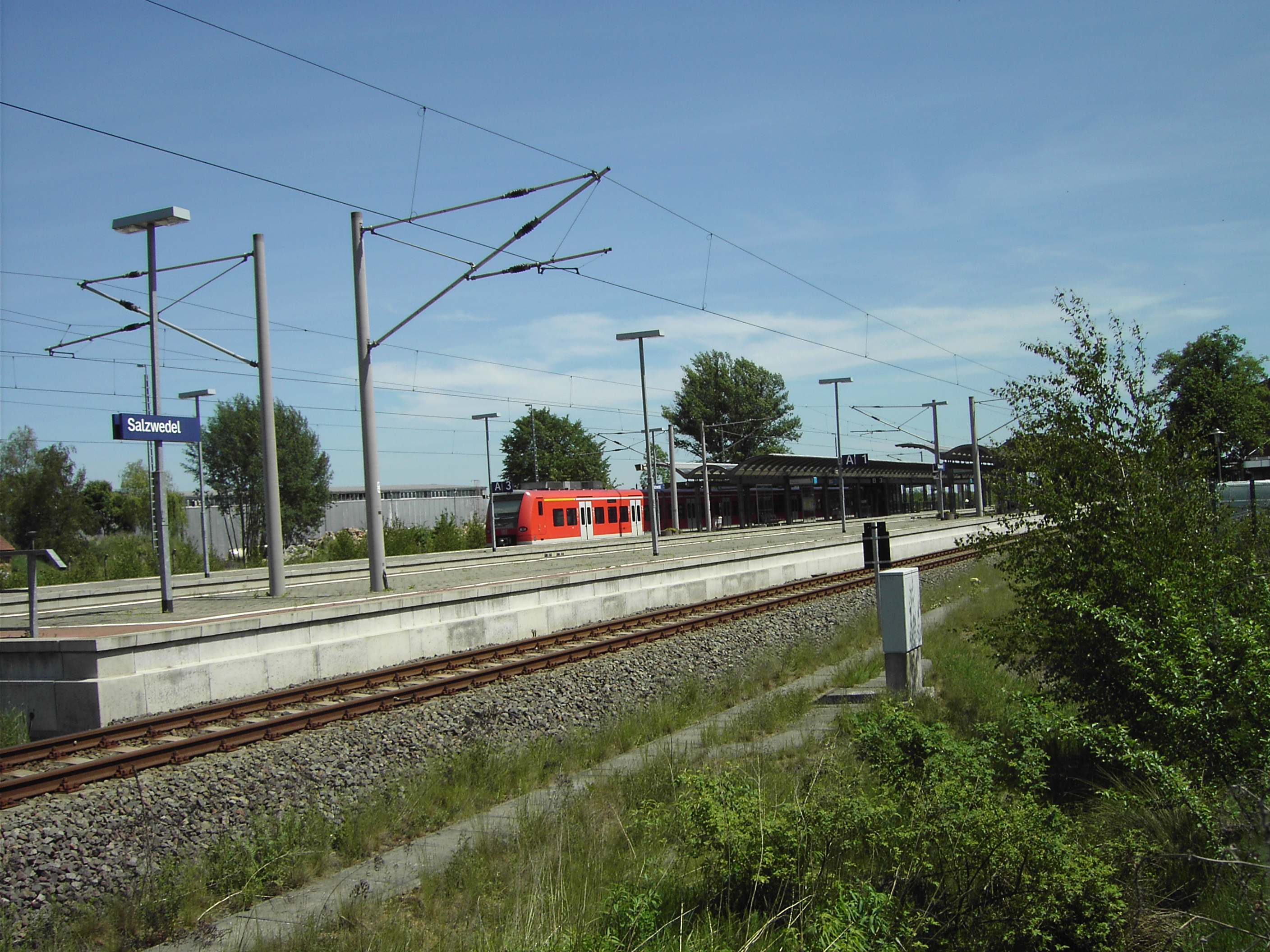
The platforms of Salzwedel station

Salzwedel station was built in 1870 during the construction of the Stendal–Uelzen railway (part of the America Line from Berlin to Bremen and Bremerhaven) by the Magdeburg-Halberstadt Railway Company. Railways formerly ran in seven directions from Salzwedel station or Salzwedel Neustadt station (which lay to the immediate east), as the table below shows. A locomotive depot (Bahnbetriebswerk) was built directly next to it in order to service these routes. During the Second World War, the station area was destroyed in an air raid on 22 February 1945, which caused about 300 deaths. Of the seven lines, only the Stendal–Uelzen railway remain. During the division of Germany the line was cut at the border, but continuous operations were restored on 19 December 1999. It has been extensively modernised since reunification and electrified so that it can be used an alternative route for Intercity-Express train from Berlin to Hamburg.

Passenger services on the last additional line connecting to the station, the Salzwedel–Wittenberg railway, were closed at the timetable change in December 2004. It had recently been upgraded. The decades-old Ferkeltaxe (“piglet taxis”) class VT2.09 railbuses were replaced by modern Desiro low-floor railcars built by Siemens from 2003. But neither they nor a specially formed citizens' initiative could save the route.

Line	Opening	Closure of passenger services
Salzwedel–Stendal	1870	
Salzwedel–Uelzen	1873	
Salzwedel–Oebisfelde	1889	2002
Salzwedel–Dannenberg	1891	1945
Salzwedel–Diesdorf	1901	1995
Salzwedel–Badel	1902	1980
Salzwedel–Wittenberge	1922	2004

== The station ==
The area around the station was reconstructed from scratch in the late 1990s. Deutsche Bahn renovated the entrance building and built two new island platforms, which can be reached by a new underpass with its entrance in an extension of the station building. The town of Salzwedel built a new bus station on the station forecourt and a large station parking area. The train station ist also a waypoint on the international cycling route Eurovelo EV13 Iron Curtain Trail that runs next to it.

== Rail services ==
Operations of regional train services were converted a few years ago to modern class 425 electric railcars. Since the timetable change in December 2006, the RE 20 service has been operated with double-deck trains.

=== Long distance trains ===
Line	Route	Frequency	Operator
IC 57	Hamburg-Altona – Hamburg – Salzwedel – Stendal – Magdeburg	One train pair	DB Fernverkehr

=== Regional trains ===
In the 2025 timetable the following service serve Salzwedel station:

Line	Route	Frequency (min)	Operator
RE 20	Magdeburg – Stendal – Salzwedel – Uelzen	60	DB Regio Südost

Until mid-December 2014 the station was also served by EuroCity "Wawel", which used to run once daily between Hamburg Altona and Wrocław Główny six days a week.

Every two-hour buses run from the bus station as the Arendsee Express to Wittenberg and as "Drömling-Express" to Oebisfelde. These services were established after the cancellation of passenger services on the Salzwedel–Wittenberg railway and the Oebisfelde–Salzwedel railway.
