= Binde, Germany =

Binde
- Stadtteil of Arendsee
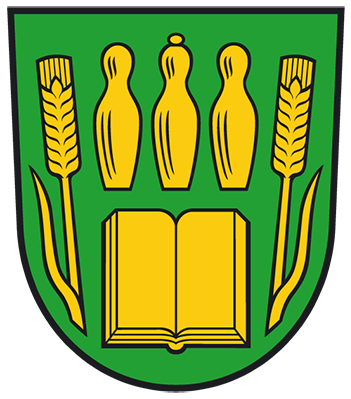
- Coat of arms
- Interactive map of Binde
- Location within Germany Location within Saxony-Anhalt
- Coordinates: 52°51′24″N 11°23′12″E
- Country: Germany
- State: Saxony-Anhalt
- District: Altmarkkreis Salzwedel
- Town: Arendsee

Area
  - Total: 15.90 km^{2} (6.14 sq mi)
- Elevation: 27 m (89 ft)

Population (2006-12-31)
  - Total: 371
  - Density: 23.3/km^{2} (60.4/sq mi)
- Time zone: UTC+01:00 (CET)
  - Summer (DST): UTC+02:00 (CEST)
- Postal codes: 29416
- Dialling codes: 039036
- Vehicle registration: SAW

Binde is a village and a former municipality in the district Altmarkkreis Salzwedel, in Saxony-Anhalt, Germany.

Since 1 January 2010, it is part of the town Arendsee.
