= D. Dornblüth & Sohn =

- Industry: Watches
- Founded: 1999
- Founders: Dieter Dornblüth; Dirk Dornblüth
- Headquarters: Kalbe, Saxony-Anhalt, Germany
- Products: Watches and timepieces
- Number of employees: 9
- Website: www.dornblueth.com

D. Dornblüth & Sohn is a manufacturer of luxury hand-made wristwatches based in Kalbe, Germany. The company generally uses older equipment for the production of the watches, and annual production is approximately 120-180 pieces.

== History ==
D. Dornblüth & Sohn was founded in 1999 by Dieter Dornblüth and his son Dirk. In 2002, the company released its first production model, based around a design Dieter Dornblüth had created 40 years earlier but had all but forgotten until Dirk presented him with a gift of a self-designed watch on his 60th birthday. The company enjoyed moderate growth over the following years, moving into a new workspace in 2003 which subsequently required further expansion in 2005 to keep up with demand. After restoring the chronometer of the Gorch Fock I in 2008, Dornblüth released a limited edition watch to commemorate the ship's 75th anniversary. In 2012 the "Quintus", based around their fifth calibre, also their first in-house movement, was released.

== See also ==
- List of German watch manufacturers
