= Kerkau =

- Stadtteil of Arendsee
- Interactive map of Kerkau
- Location within Germany Location within Saxony-Anhalt
- Coordinates: 52°47′00″N 11°26′00″E
- Country: Germany
- State: Saxony-Anhalt
- District: Altmarkkreis Salzwedel
- Town: Arendsee

Area
  - Total: 11.09 km^{2} (4.28 sq mi)
- Elevation: 29 m (95 ft)

Population (2006-12-31)
  - Total: 225
  - Density: 20.3/km^{2} (52.5/sq mi)
- Time zone: UTC+01:00 (CET)
  - Summer (DST): UTC+02:00 (CEST)
- Postal codes: 29416
- Dialling codes: 039003
- Vehicle registration: SAW

Kerkau is a village and a former municipality in the district Altmarkkreis Salzwedel, in Saxony-Anhalt, Germany.

Since 1 January 2010, it is part of the town Arendsee.
