= Kaulitz =

- Stadtteil of Arendsee
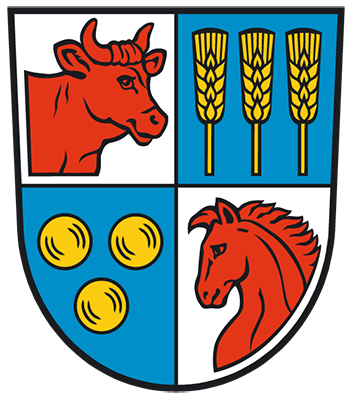
- Coat of arms
- Interactive map of Kaulitz
- Location within Germany Location within Saxony-Anhalt
- Coordinates: 52°52′48″N 11°23′48″E
- Country: Germany
- State: Saxony-Anhalt
- District: Altmarkkreis Salzwedel
- Town: Arendsee

Area
  - Total: 11.49 km^{2} (4.44 sq mi)
- Elevation: 32 m (105 ft)

Population (2006-12-31)
  - Total: 207
  - Density: 18.0/km^{2} (46.7/sq mi)
- Time zone: UTC+01:00 (CET)
  - Summer (DST): UTC+02:00 (CEST)
- Postal codes: 29416
- Dialling codes: 039036
- Vehicle registration: SAW

Kaulitz is a village and a former municipality in the district Altmarkkreis Salzwedel, in Saxony-Anhalt, Germany.

Since 1 January 2010, it is part of the town Arendsee.
