= Altmersleben =

- Stadtteil of Kalbe
- Interactive map of Altmersleben
- Location within Germany Location within Saxony-Anhalt
- Coordinates: 52°41′00″N 11°25′48″E
- Country: Germany
- State: Saxony-Anhalt
- District: Altmarkkreis Salzwedel
- Town: Kalbe

Area
  - Total: 13.34 km^{2} (5.15 sq mi)
- Elevation: 26 m (85 ft)

Population (2006)
  - Total: 294
  - Density: 22.0/km^{2} (57.1/sq mi)
- Time zone: UTC+01:00 (CET)
  - Summer (DST): UTC+02:00 (CEST)
- Postal codes: 39624
- Dialling codes: 039080
- Vehicle registration: SAW

Altmersleben is a village and a former municipality in the district Altmarkkreis Salzwedel, in Saxony-Anhalt, Germany. Since 1 January 2009, it is part of the town Kalbe. It is a linear village.
