= Kläden =

- Stadtteil of Arendsee
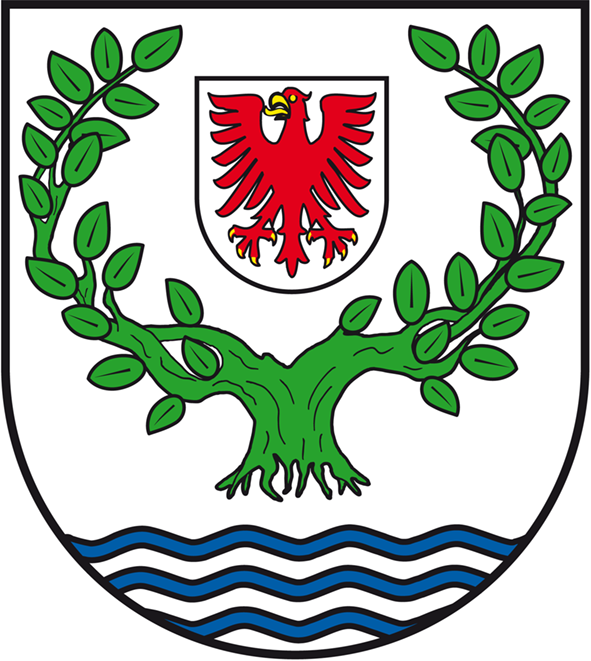
- Coat of arms
- Interactive map of Kläden
- Location within Germany Location within Saxony-Anhalt
- Coordinates: 52°52′00″N 11°26′00″E
- Country: Germany
- State: Saxony-Anhalt
- District: Altmarkkreis Salzwedel
- Town: Arendsee

Area
  - Total: 11.16 km^{2} (4.31 sq mi)
- Elevation: 29 m (95 ft)

Population (2006-12-31)
  - Total: 228
  - Density: 20.4/km^{2} (52.9/sq mi)
- Time zone: UTC+01:00 (CET)
  - Summer (DST): UTC+02:00 (CEST)
- Postal codes: 39619
- Dialling codes: 039384
- Vehicle registration: SAW

Kläden is a village and a former municipality in the district Altmarkkreis Salzwedel, in Saxony-Anhalt, Germany. Since 1 January 2010, it is part of the town Arendsee.
