= Mechau =

- Ortsteil of Arendsee
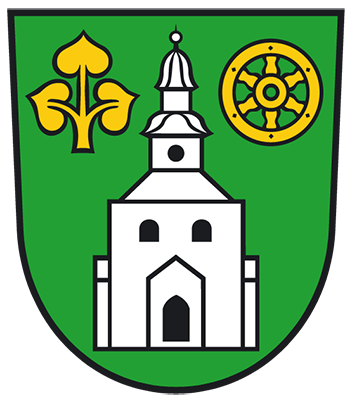
- Coat of arms
- Interactive map of Mechau
- Location within Germany Location within Saxony-Anhalt
- Coordinates: 52°52′N 11°21′E
- Country: Germany
- State: Saxony-Anhalt
- District: Altmarkkreis Salzwedel
- Town: Arendsee

Area
  - Total: 14.92 km^{2} (5.76 sq mi)
- Elevation: 24 m (79 ft)

Population (2009-12-31)
  - Total: 273
  - Density: 18.3/km^{2} (47.4/sq mi)
- Time zone: UTC+01:00 (CET)
  - Summer (DST): UTC+02:00 (CEST)
- Postal codes: 39619
- Dialling codes: 039036
- Vehicle registration: SAW

Mechau is a village and a former municipality in the district Altmarkkreis Salzwedel, in Saxony-Anhalt, Germany. Since 1 January 2011, it is part of the town Arendsee.
