= Vissum =

- Ortsteil of Arendsee
- Interactive map of Vissum
- Location within Germany Location within Saxony-Anhalt
- Coordinates: 52°49′12″N 11°21′00″E
- Country: Germany
- State: Saxony-Anhalt
- District: Altmarkkreis Salzwedel
- Town: Arendsee

Area
  - Total: 12.33 km^{2} (4.76 sq mi)
- Elevation: 29 m (95 ft)

Population (2009-12-31)
  - Total: 240
  - Density: 19/km^{2} (50/sq mi)
- Time zone: UTC+01:00 (CET)
  - Summer (DST): UTC+02:00 (CEST)
- Postal codes: 29416
- Dialling codes: 039034
- Vehicle registration: SAW

Vissum is a village and a former municipality in the district Altmarkkreis Salzwedel, in Saxony-Anhalt, Germany. Since January 2011, it is part of the town Arendsee.
