= Wernstedt =

- Stadtteil of Kalbe
- Interactive map of Wernstedt
- Location within Germany Location within Saxony-Anhalt
- Coordinates: 52°38′46″N 11°20′20″E
- Country: Germany
- State: Saxony-Anhalt
- District: Altmarkkreis Salzwedel
- Town: Kalbe

Area
  - Total: 9.41 km^{2} (3.63 sq mi)
- Elevation: 30 m (98 ft)

Population (2006-12-31)
  - Total: 218
  - Density: 23.2/km^{2} (60.0/sq mi)
- Time zone: UTC+01:00 (CET)
  - Summer (DST): UTC+02:00 (CEST)
- Postal codes: 39624
- Dialling codes: 039080
- Vehicle registration: SAW

Wernstedt is a village and a former municipality in the district Altmarkkreis Salzwedel, in Saxony-Anhalt, Germany. Since 1 January 2009, it has been a part of the town Kalbe.
