= Rademin =

- Ortsteil of Arendsee
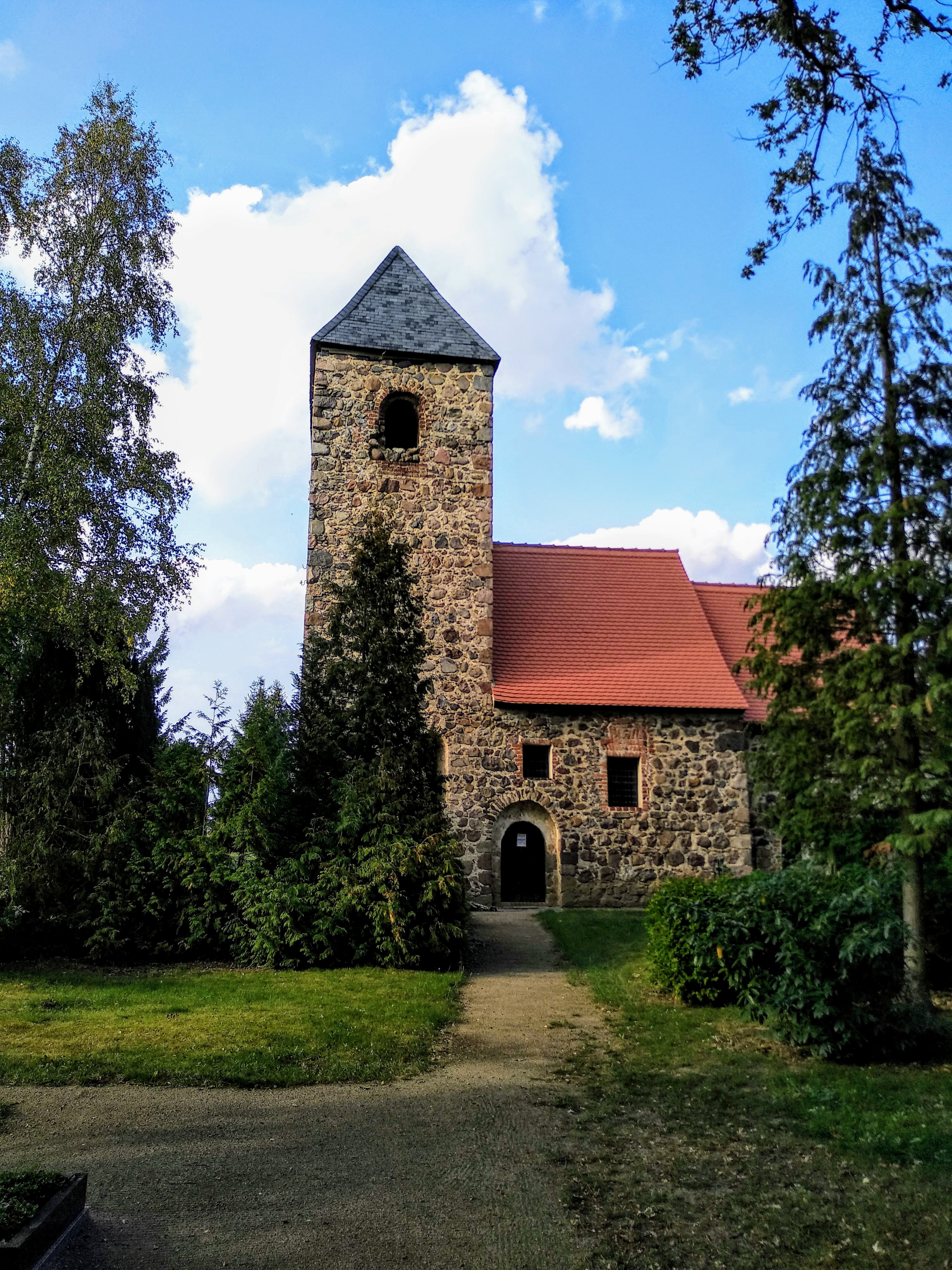
- Interactive map of Rademin
- Location within Germany Location within Saxony-Anhalt
- Coordinates: 52°47′48″N 11°20′00″E
- Country: Germany
- State: Saxony-Anhalt
- District: Altmarkkreis Salzwedel
- Town: Arendsee

Area
  - Total: 14.12 km^{2} (5.45 sq mi)
- Elevation: 35 m (115 ft)

Population (2009-12-31)
  - Total: 227
  - Density: 16.1/km^{2} (41.6/sq mi)
- Time zone: UTC+01:00 (CET)
  - Summer (DST): UTC+02:00 (CEST)
- Postal codes: 29416
- Dialling codes: 039034
- Vehicle registration: SAW

Rademin is a village and a former municipality in the district Altmarkkreis Salzwedel, in Saxony-Anhalt, Germany. Since 1 January 2011, it is part of the town Arendsee.
