= Kahrstedt =

- Stadtteil of Kalbe
- Interactive map of Kahrstedt
- Location within Germany Location within Saxony-Anhalt
- Coordinates: 52°43′00″N 11°26′00″E
- Country: Germany
- State: Saxony-Anhalt
- District: Altmarkkreis Salzwedel
- Town: Kalbe

Area
  - Total: 13.48 km^{2} (5.20 sq mi)
- Elevation: 63 m (207 ft)

Population (2006-12-31)
  - Total: 275
  - Density: 20.4/km^{2} (52.8/sq mi)
- Time zone: UTC+01:00 (CET)
  - Summer (DST): UTC+02:00 (CEST)
- Postal codes: 39624
- Dialling codes: 039030
- Vehicle registration: SAW

Kahrstedt is a village and a former municipality in the district Altmarkkreis Salzwedel, in Saxony-Anhalt, Germany. Since 1 January 2009, it is part of the town Kalbe.
