= Güssefeld =

- District of Kalbe, Saxony-Anhalt
- Interactive map of Güssefeld
- Location within Germany Location within Saxony-Anhalt
- Coordinates: 52°43′00″N 11°22′00″E
- Country: Germany
- State: Saxony-Anhalt
- District: Altmarkkreis Salzwedel
- Town: Kalbe, Saxony-Anhalt

Area
  - Total: 11.11 km^{2} (4.29 sq mi)
- Elevation: 53 m (174 ft)

Population (2006-12-31)
  - Total: 185
  - Density: 16.7/km^{2} (43.1/sq mi)
- Time zone: UTC+01:00 (CET)
  - Summer (DST): UTC+02:00 (CEST)
- Postal codes: 39624
- Dialling codes: 039009
- Vehicle registration: SAW

Güssefeld is a village and a former municipality in the district Altmarkkreis Salzwedel, in Saxony-Anhalt, Germany. Since 1 January 2009, it has been part of the town of Kalbe.
