= Badel, Somalia =

Badel is a small village in Somalia. In 2007, it was the target of an attack on al-Qaeda by American forces.
