= Neulingen, Saxony-Anhalt =

Neulingen
- Stadtteil of Arendsee
- Interactive map of Neulingen
- Location within Germany Location within Saxony-Anhalt
- Coordinates: 52°52′00″N 11°34′12″E
- Country: Germany
- State: Saxony-Anhalt
- District: Altmarkkreis Salzwedel
- Town: Arendsee

Area
  - Total: 9.93 km^{2} (3.83 sq mi)
- Elevation: 30 m (98 ft)

Population (2006-12-31)
  - Total: 86
  - Density: 8.7/km^{2} (22/sq mi)
- Time zone: UTC+01:00 (CET)
  - Summer (DST): UTC+02:00 (CEST)
- Postal codes: 39615
- Dialling codes: 039384
- Vehicle registration: SAW

Neulingen (German pronunciation: [ˈnɔʏlɪŋən]) is a village and a former municipality in the district Altmarkkreis Salzwedel, in Saxony-Anhalt, Germany.

Since 1 January 2010, it is part of the town Arendsee.
