= Fleetmark =

- Ortsteil of Arendsee
- Interactive map of Fleetmark
- Location within Germany Location within Saxony-Anhalt
- Coordinates: 52°47′48″N 11°23′12″E
- Country: Germany
- State: Saxony-Anhalt
- District: Altmarkkreis Salzwedel
- Town: Arendsee

Area
  - Total: 29.04 km^{2} (11.21 sq mi)
- Elevation: 34 m (112 ft)

Population (2009-12-31)
  - Total: 812
  - Density: 28.0/km^{2} (72.4/sq mi)
- Time zone: UTC+01:00 (CET)
  - Summer (DST): UTC+02:00 (CEST)
- Postal codes: 29416
- Dialling codes: 039034
- Vehicle registration: SAW

Fleetmark is a village and a former municipality in the district Altmarkkreis Salzwedel, in Saxony-Anhalt, Germany. Since 1 January 2011, it is part of the town Arendsee.
