= Winkelstedt =

- Stadtteil of Kalbe
- Interactive map of Winkelstedt
- Location within Germany Location within Saxony-Anhalt
- Coordinates: 52°40′38″N 11°19′06″E
- Country: Germany
- State: Saxony-Anhalt
- District: Altmarkkreis Salzwedel
- Town: Kalbe

Area
  - Total: 20.91 km^{2} (8.07 sq mi)
- Elevation: 31 m (102 ft)

Population (2006-12-31)
  - Total: 320
  - Density: 15/km^{2} (40/sq mi)
- Time zone: UTC+01:00 (CET)
  - Summer (DST): UTC+02:00 (CEST)
- Postal codes: 39624
- Dialling codes: 039081
- Vehicle registration: SAW

Winkelstedt is a village and a former municipality in the district Altmarkkreis Salzwedel, in Saxony-Anhalt, Germany. Since 1 January 2009, it is part of the town Kalbe.
