= Jeggeleben =

- Ortsteil of Kalbe
- Interactive map of Jeggeleben
- Location within Germany Location within Saxony-Anhalt
- Coordinates: 52°45′36″N 11°18′00″E
- Country: Germany
- State: Saxony-Anhalt
- District: Altmarkkreis Salzwedel
- Town: Kalbe

Area
  - Total: 19.59 km^{2} (7.56 sq mi)
- Elevation: 59 m (194 ft)

Population (2009-12-31)
  - Total: 417
  - Density: 21.3/km^{2} (55.1/sq mi)
- Time zone: UTC+01:00 (CET)
  - Summer (DST): UTC+02:00 (CEST)
- Postal codes: 29416
- Dialling codes: 039009
- Vehicle registration: SAW

Jeggeleben is a village and a former municipality in the district Altmarkkreis Salzwedel, in Saxony-Anhalt, Germany. Since 1 January 2011, it is part of the town Kalbe.
