= Kalbe, Saxony-Anhalt =

Kalbe
- Town
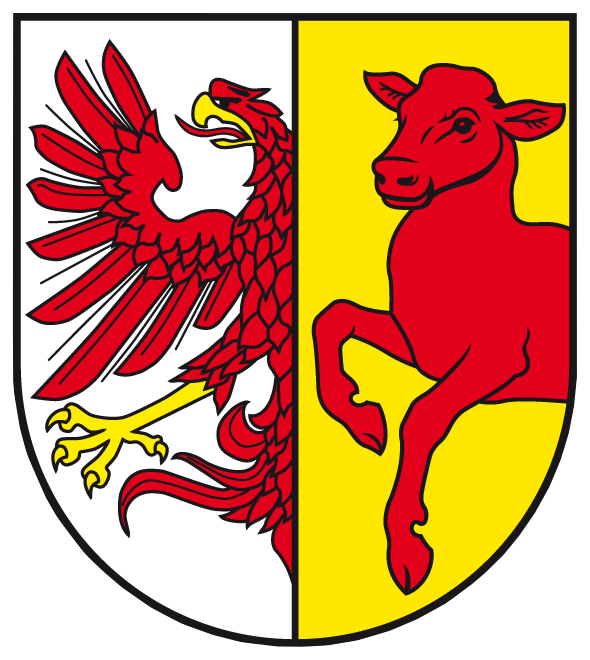
- Coat of arms

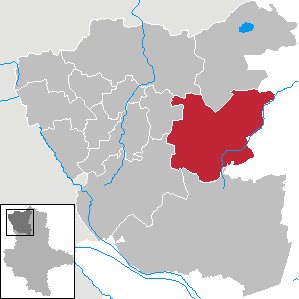
- Location of Kalbe within Altmarkkreis Salzwedel district
- Interactive map of Kalbe
- Location within Germany Location within Saxony-Anhalt
- Coordinates: 52°38′00″N 11°24′00″E
- Country: Germany
- State: Saxony-Anhalt
- District: Altmarkkreis Salzwedel

Government
  - Mayor (2023–30): Andreas Pietsch

Area
  - Total: 272.51 km^{2} (105.22 sq mi)
- Elevation: 29 m (95 ft)

Population (2025-12-31)
  - Total: 6,922
  - Density: 25.40/km^{2} (65.79/sq mi)
- Time zone: UTC+01:00 (CET)
  - Summer (DST): UTC+02:00 (CEST)
- Postal codes: 39624, 39638
- Dialling codes: 039080, 039009, 039030, 039081, 039085
- Vehicle registration: SAW
- Website: stadt-kalbe-milde.de

Kalbe (German pronunciation: [ˈkalbə]) is a town in the Altmarkkreis Salzwedel (district), in Saxony-Anhalt, Germany. It is situated approximately 15 km north of Gardelegen, on the river Milde. To avoid confusion with Calbe, it is also called Kalbe an der Milde.

Kalbe an der Milde was the location of the World War II German Naval VLF Goliath transmitter complex. Kalbe is home to D. Dornblüth & Sohn, a small luxury watch maker.

== Geography ==
The town Kalbe consists of the following Ortschaften or municipal divisions:

- Altmersleben
- Badel
- Brunau
- Engersen
- Güssefeld
- Jeetze
- Jeggeleben
- Kahrstedt
- Kakerbeck
- Kalbe (Milde)
- Neuendorf am Damm
- Packebusch
- Vienau
- Wernstedt
- Winkelstedt
- Zethlingen

== History ==
The oldest document in which Kalbe was mentioned dates from 1012 or 1018. The place was called Calwa. It was surrounded by the marshy terrain of river Milde and its tributaries but it was not protected by a wall or a moat like other towns. The only entrances to the town were two small gates with guardhouses but the year of construction is unknown. Salzwedelsches Tor (Salzwedel Gate) was the northern and Gardelegensches Tor (Gardelegen Gate) was the southern gate. There is no record of when Kalbe was granted town rights. In a document dating from 1324, however, Kalbe was mentioned as town Stadt to Calve. In 1541 Kalbe had about 1100 inhabitants. During the Thirty Years' War Kalbe suffered heavy damage and was plundered several times, especially between 1626 and 1632, and many inhabitants died from plague. In 1670, several decades after the end of the war, Kalbe had only 80 inhabitants. In the 19th century cultivation of hops and tobacco were important economic factors, and in 1900 Kalbe had 1,856 inhabitants

From 1945 to 1990 Kalbe was a part of the German Democratic Republic. After the reunification of Germany in 1990, the town faced economic difficulties. The railway line inaugurated in 1899 was shut down in 2001. In 2009 and 2011 more than 30 villages were incorporated into Kalbe and the number of inhabitants rose from 2 600 to more than 7 000.

== Sights ==
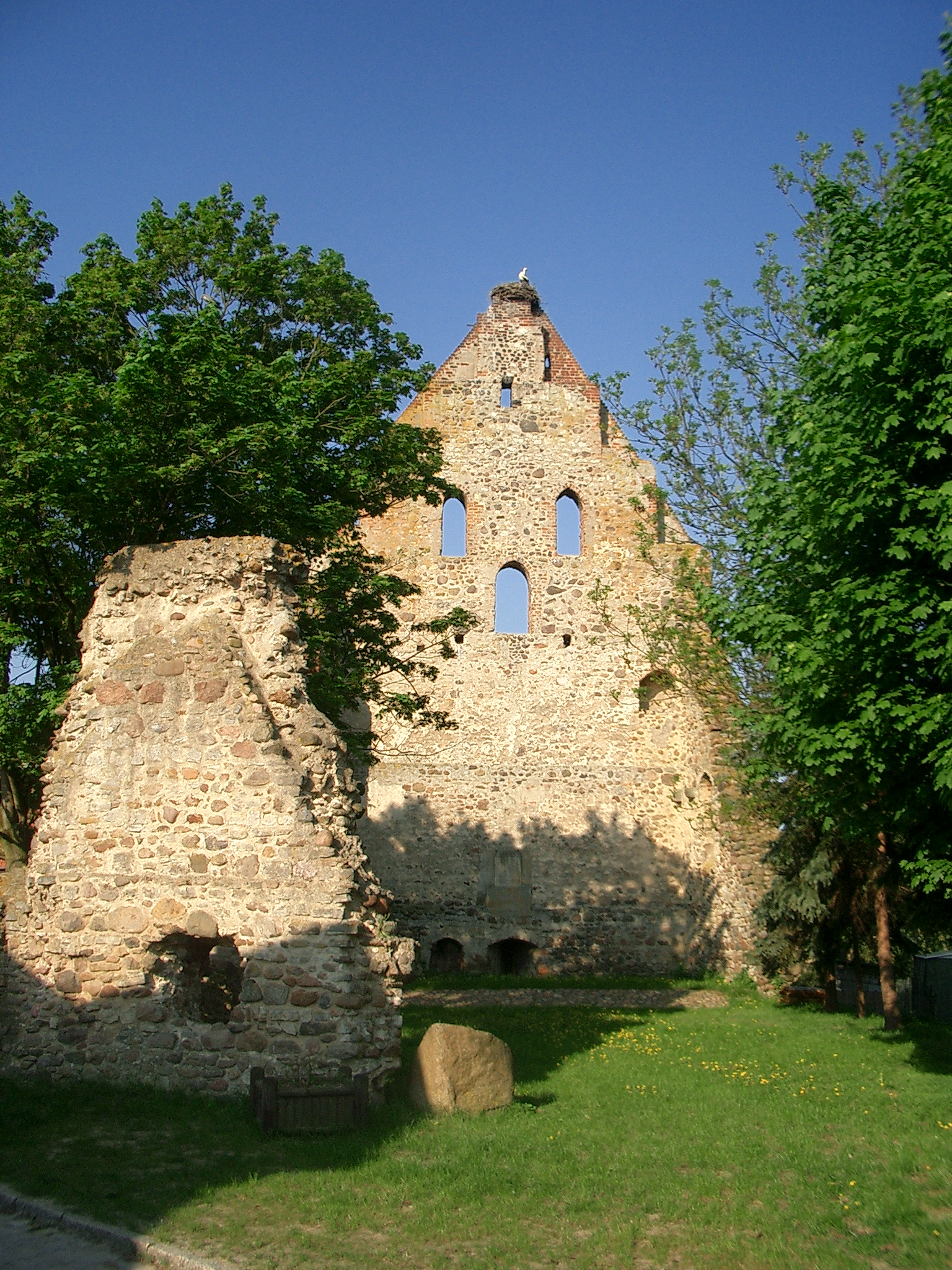
Ruins of Burg Kalbe

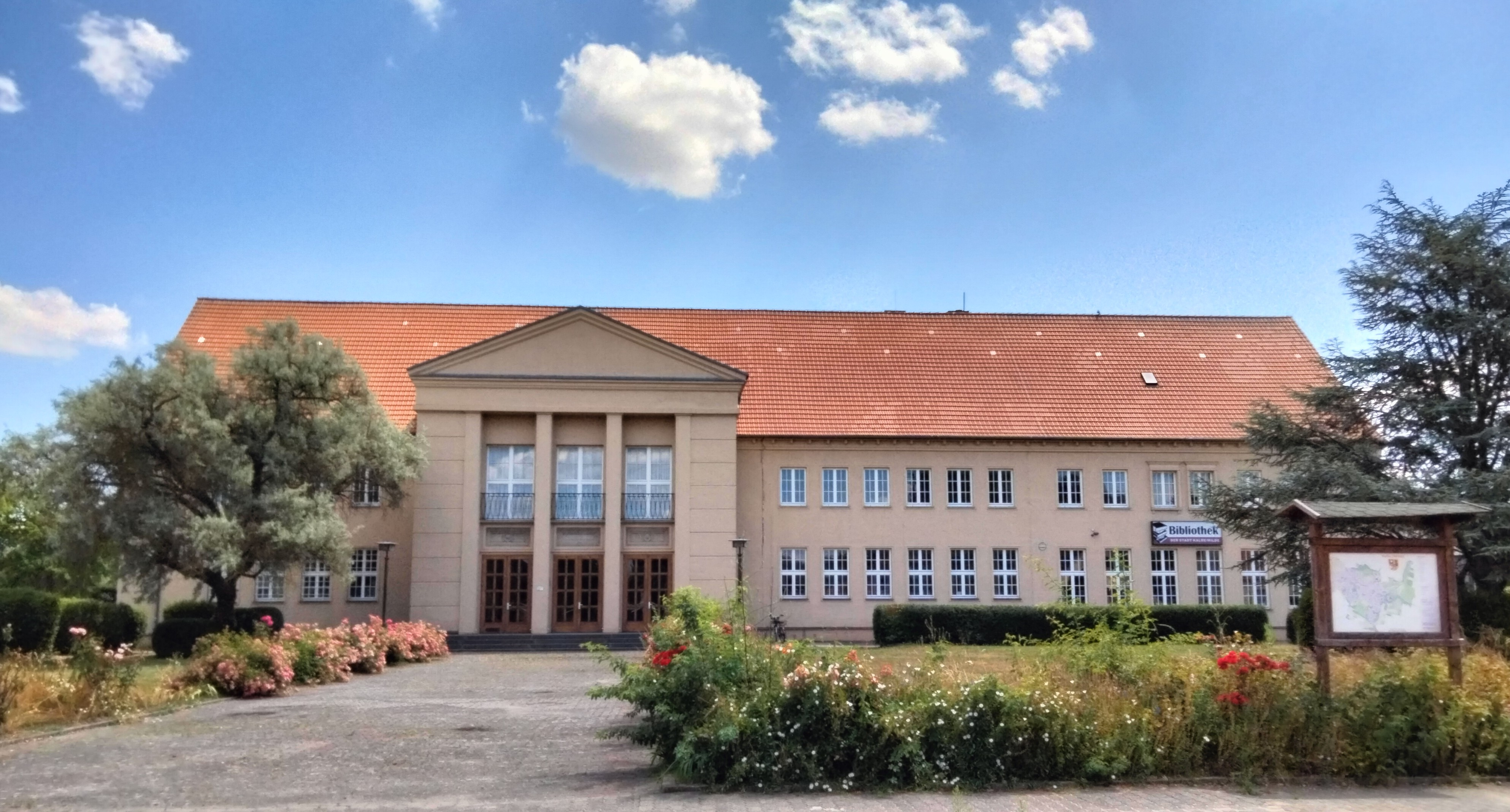
Cultural Centre

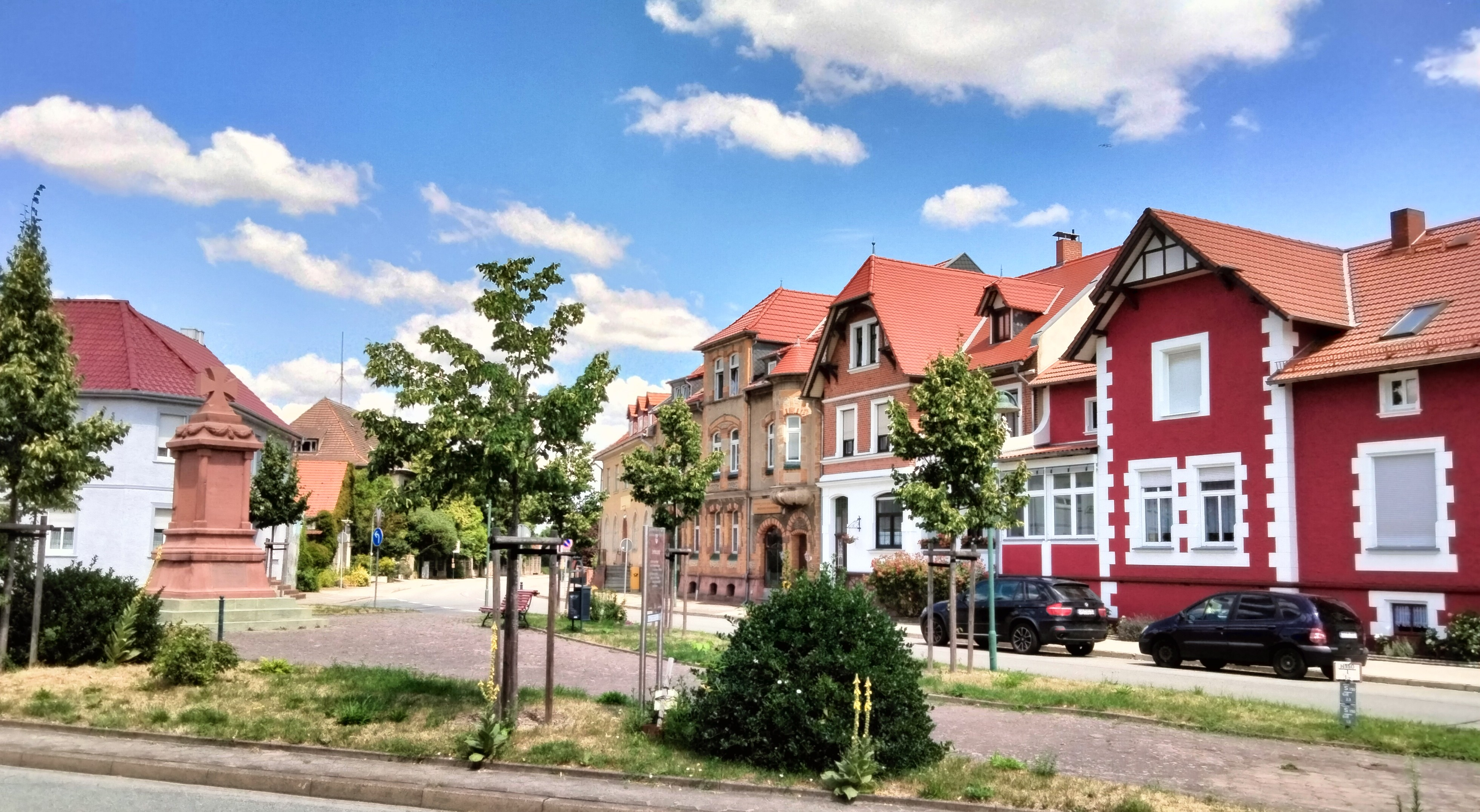
Denkmalsplatz

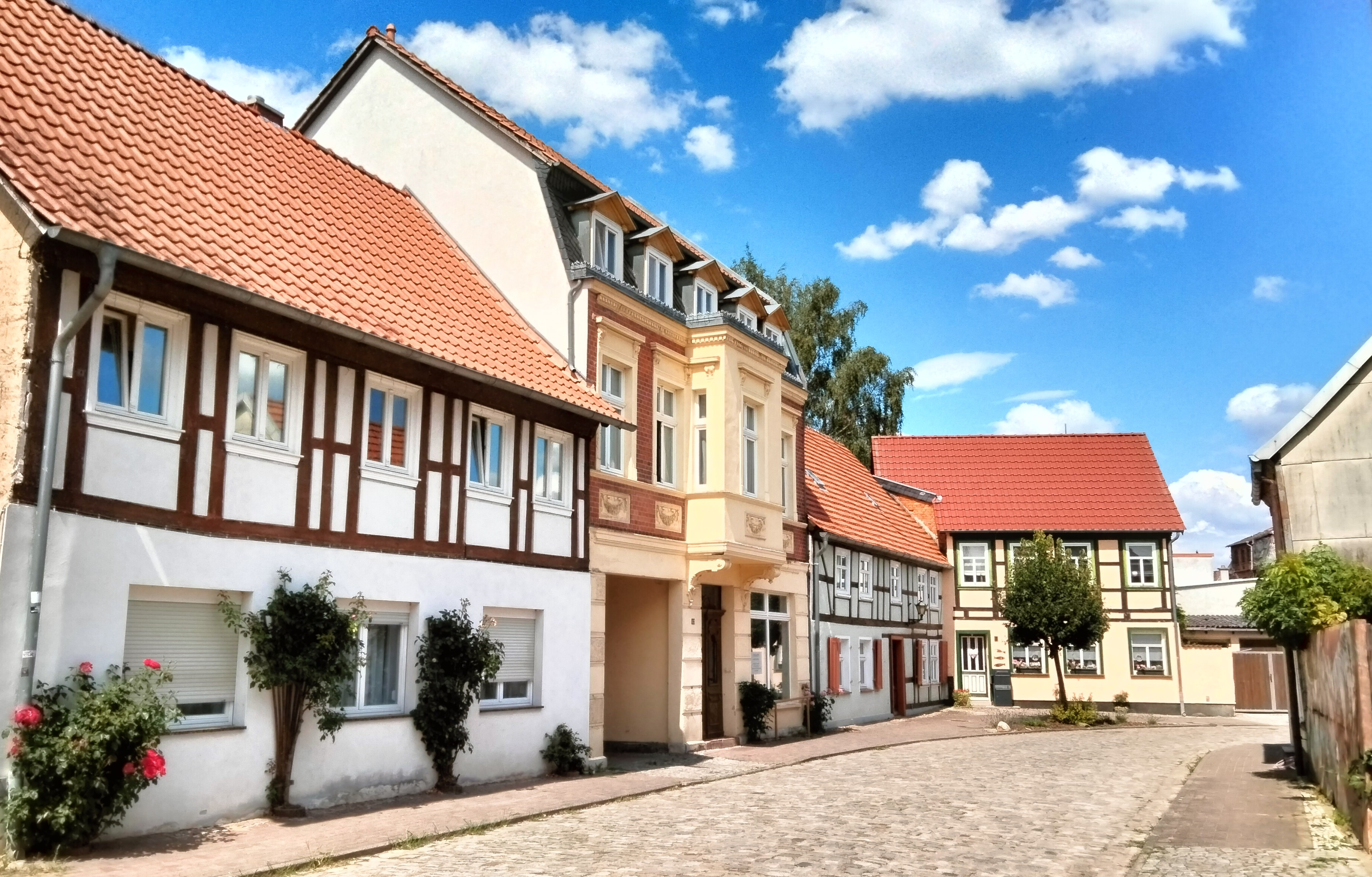
Half-timbered houses in Gerichtsstraße, old centre

The castle Burg Kalbe was built on an island in the marshy terrain on river Milde in the 10th century and destroyed in the Thirty Years' War. The oldest document in which the castle was mentioned dates from 1196. The ruins of the palas and the chapel can be visited. The guardhouse was rebuilt and is used as a museum.

The Kulturhaus (Cultural Centre), inaugurated in 1956 and enlarged in 1958 and in 1977 represents the style of Socialist realism. It was declared a building of cultural heritage. Today it houses the municipal library.

Saint Nicolai, a protestant church, was built between 1150 and 1170 and renovated in 1573, 1878, 1965 and 2020. Close to the church which was built in the middle of the old town centre various half-timbered houses can be visited. The place in front of the church might have been used as a market place in former times but unlike other towns Kalbe did not have an official market place with a town hall. The adjoining street called Marktstraße (Market Street) might have been used as an oblong street market instead.

The old town centre is surrounded by river Milde with many small bridges. Kalbe is known as "Town of 100 Bridges". Today Denkmalsplatz (Monument Place) with several buildings dating from Gründerzeit is considered to be the centre of Kalbe.
