= Thielbeer =

- Stadtteil of Arendsee
- Interactive map of Thielbeer
- Location within Germany Location within Saxony-Anhalt
- Coordinates: 52°51′00″N 11°29′00″E
- Country: Germany
- State: Saxony-Anhalt
- District: Altmarkkreis Salzwedel
- Town: Arendsee

Area
  - Total: 11.19 km^{2} (4.32 sq mi)
- Elevation: 31 m (102 ft)

Population (2008-12-31)
  - Total: 165
  - Density: 14.7/km^{2} (38.2/sq mi)
- Time zone: UTC+01:00 (CET)
  - Summer (DST): UTC+02:00 (CEST)
- Postal codes: 39619
- Dialling codes: 039384
- Vehicle registration: SAW

Thielbeer is a village and a former municipality in the district Altmarkkreis Salzwedel, in Saxony-Anhalt, Germany.

Since 1 January 2010, it is part of the town Arendsee.
