= Kleinau =

- Stadtteil of Arendsee
- Interactive map of Kleinau
- Location within Germany Location within Saxony-Anhalt
- Coordinates: 52°48′00″N 11°31′00″E
- Country: Germany
- State: Saxony-Anhalt
- District: Altmarkkreis Salzwedel
- Town: Arendsee

Area
  - Total: 21.41 km^{2} (8.27 sq mi)
- Elevation: 26 m (85 ft)

Population (2006-12-31)
  - Total: 610
  - Density: 28/km^{2} (74/sq mi)
- Time zone: UTC+01:00 (CET)
  - Summer (DST): UTC+02:00 (CEST)
- Postal codes: 39606
- Dialling codes: 039003
- Vehicle registration: SAW

Kleinau is a village and a former municipality in the district Altmarkkreis Salzwedel, in Saxony-Anhalt, Germany.

Since 1 January 2010, it is part of the town Arendsee.
