= Zethlingen =

- Ortsteil of Kalbe
- Interactive map of Zethlingen
- Location within Germany Location within Saxony-Anhalt
- Coordinates: 52°42′12″N 11°17′36″E
- Country: Germany
- State: Saxony-Anhalt
- District: Altmarkkreis Salzwedel
- Town: Kalbe

Area
  - Total: 16.72 km^{2} (6.46 sq mi)
- Elevation: 36 m (118 ft)

Population (2009-12-31)
  - Total: 307
  - Density: 18.4/km^{2} (47.6/sq mi)
- Time zone: UTC+01:00 (CET)
  - Summer (DST): UTC+02:00 (CEST)
- Postal codes: 39624
- Dialling codes: 039009
- Vehicle registration: SAW
- Website: www.vg-salzwedel-land.de

Zethlingen is a village and a former municipality in the district Altmarkkreis Salzwedel, in Saxony-Anhalt, Germany. Since 1 January 2011, it is part of the town Kalbe.
