= Engersen =

- Stadtteil of Kalbe
- Interactive map of Engersen
- Location within Germany Location within Saxony-Anhalt
- Coordinates: 52°37′00″N 11°20′36″E
- Country: Germany
- State: Saxony-Anhalt
- District: Altmarkkreis Salzwedel
- Town: Kalbe

Area
  - Total: 16.60 km^{2} (6.41 sq mi)
- Elevation: 37 m (121 ft)

Population (2006-12-31)
  - Total: 548
  - Density: 33.0/km^{2} (85.5/sq mi)
- Time zone: UTC+01:00 (CET)
  - Summer (DST): UTC+02:00 (CEST)
- Postal codes: 39638
- Dialling codes: 039085
- Vehicle registration: SAW

Engersen is a village and a former municipality in the district Altmarkkreis Salzwedel, in Saxony-Anhalt, Germany.

Since 1 January 2010, it is part of the town Kalbe.
