= Badel, Germany =

Badel
- Ortsteil of Kalbe
- Interactive map of Badel
- Location within Germany Location within Saxony-Anhalt
- Coordinates: 52°44′00″N 11°19′00″E
- Country: Germany
- State: Saxony-Anhalt
- District: Altmarkkreis Salzwedel
- Town: Kalbe

Area
  - Total: 13.29 km^{2} (5.13 sq mi)
- Elevation: 42 m (138 ft)

Population (2009-12-31)
  - Total: 427
  - Density: 32.1/km^{2} (83.2/sq mi)
- Time zone: UTC+01:00 (CET)
  - Summer (DST): UTC+02:00 (CEST)
- Postal codes: 39624
- Dialling codes: 039009
- Vehicle registration: SAW

Badel is a village and a former municipality in the district Altmarkkreis Salzwedel, in Saxony-Anhalt, Germany. Since 1 January 2011, it is part of the town Kalbe.
