= Schrampe =

- Stadtteil of Arendsee
- Interactive map of Schrampe
- Location within Germany Location within Saxony-Anhalt
- Coordinates: 52°53′36″N 11°26′36″E
- Country: Germany
- State: Saxony-Anhalt
- District: Altmarkkreis Salzwedel
- Town: Arendsee

Area
  - Total: 13.17 km^{2} (5.08 sq mi)
- Elevation: 22 m (72 ft)

Population (2006-12-31)
  - Total: 313
  - Density: 23.8/km^{2} (61.6/sq mi)
- Time zone: UTC+01:00 (CET)
  - Summer (DST): UTC+02:00 (CEST)
- Postal codes: 39619
- Dialling codes: 039384
- Vehicle registration: SAW

Schrampe is a village and a former municipality in the district Altmarkkreis Salzwedel, in Saxony-Anhalt, Germany. Since 1 January 2010, it is part of the town Arendsee.
