= Jeetze =

- Stadtteil of Kalbe
- Interactive map of Jeetze
- Location within Germany Location within Saxony-Anhalt
- Coordinates: 52°44′36″N 11°25′12″E
- Country: Germany
- State: Saxony-Anhalt
- District: Altmarkkreis Salzwedel
- Town: Kalbe

Area
  - Total: 13.31 km^{2} (5.14 sq mi)
- Elevation: 30 m (98 ft)

Population (2006-12-31)
  - Total: 389
  - Density: 29.2/km^{2} (75.7/sq mi)
- Time zone: UTC+01:00 (CET)
  - Summer (DST): UTC+02:00 (CEST)
- Postal codes: 39624
- Dialling codes: 039030
- Vehicle registration: SAW

Jeetze (German pronunciation: [ˈjeːt͡sə]) is a village and a former municipality in the district Altmarkkreis Salzwedel, in Saxony-Anhalt, Germany.

Since 1 January 2010, it is part of the town Kalbe.
