= Salzwedel–Dannenberg railway =

Former railway line in Germany

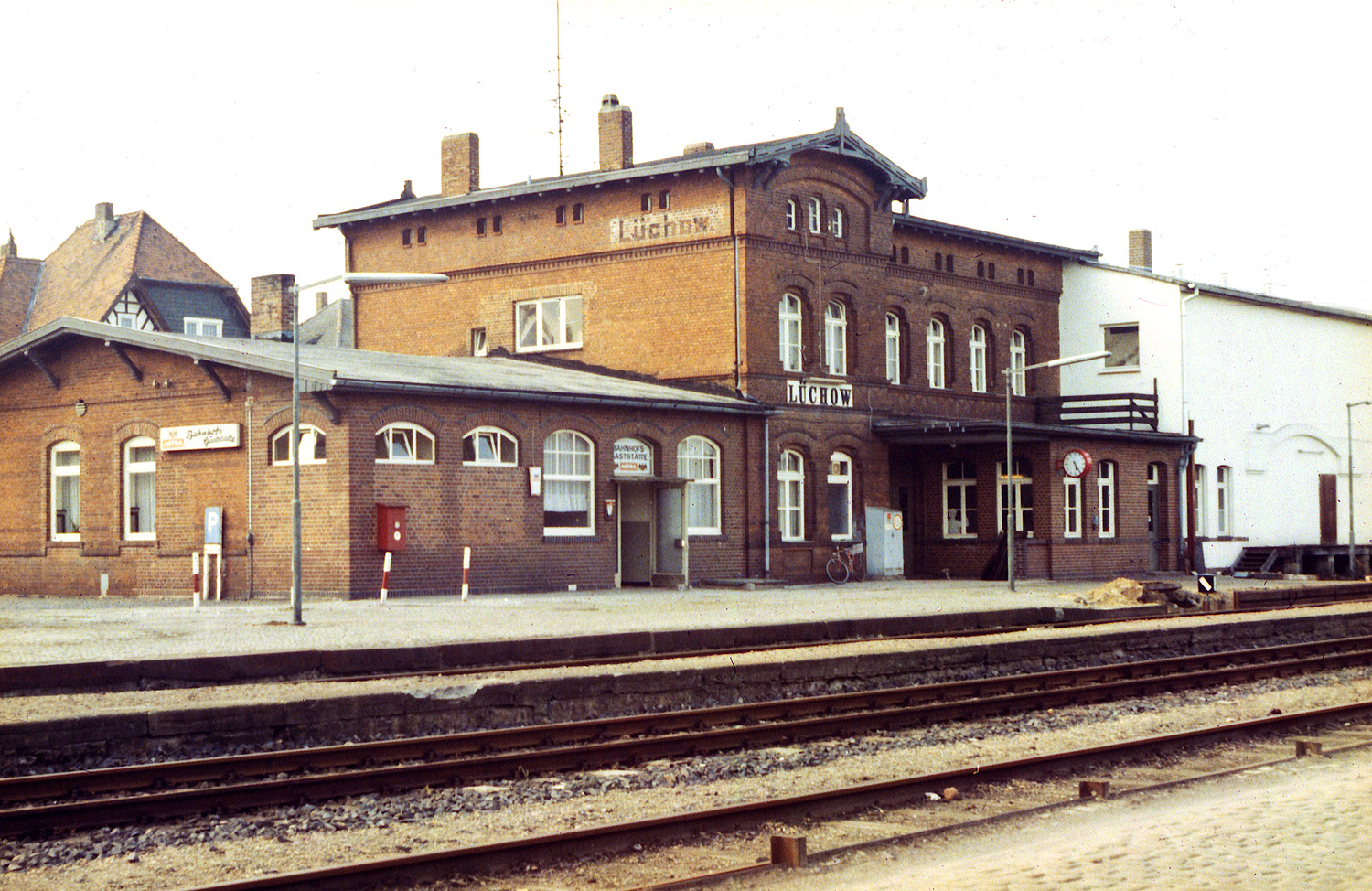
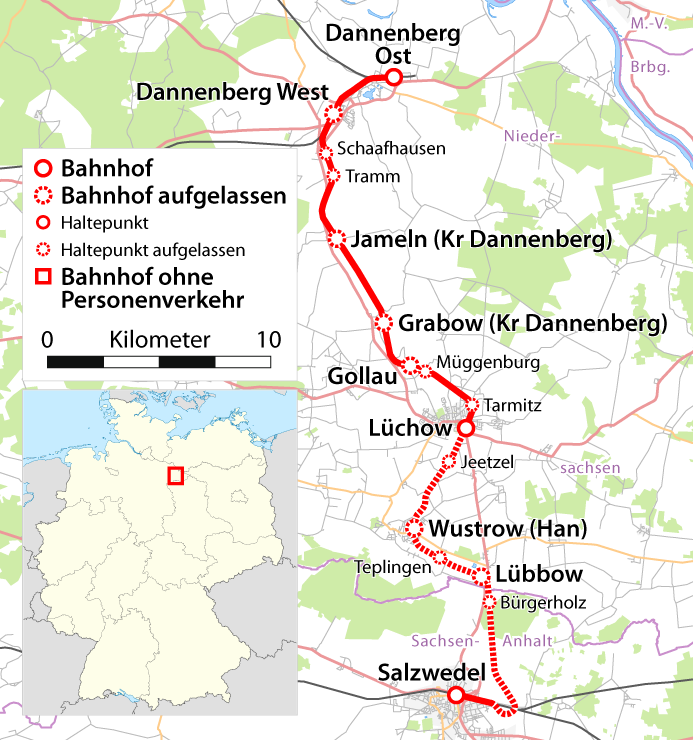
- Lüchow station in 1983

Overview
- Line number: 6905

Service
- Route number: 117a (1914); 117b (1925); 117c (1930); 187d (1937); 186f (1939); 209d (1941); 109h (1950-1970); 152 (1971-1975); 113 (since 2005)

Technical
- Line length: 36.2 km (22.5 mi)
- Track gauge: 1,435 mm (4 ft 8 1/2 in)

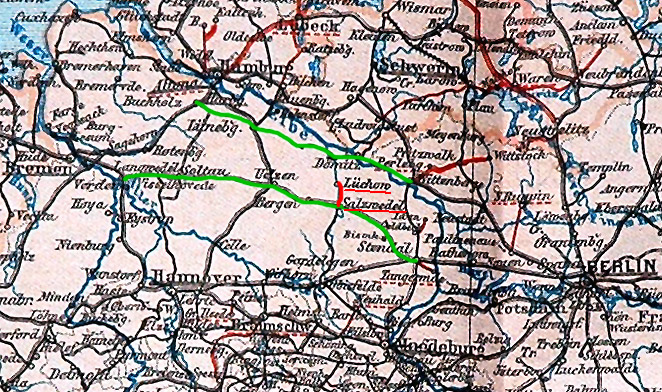
Lüchow lay between the Wittenberge–Buchholz (above) and Stendal–Langwedel lines and was linked to a stub line in 1891

The Salzwedel–Dannenberg railway was a branch line between Salzwedel in the north of Saxony-Anhalt and Dannenberg in eastern Lower Saxony in Germany. It was built in 1891 by the Prussian state railways, initially as a stub line from Salzwedel to Lüchow and extended in 1911 to Dannenberg. Shortly before the end of the Second World War the line between Salzwedel in the Soviet Zone and Lübbow in the British Zone was cut. Passenger services ceased in 1975, goods trains continued tor run until the end of 1997. The section still being worked between Lüchow and the station at Dannenberg Ost has been owned since 2001 by the Deutsche Regionaleisenbahn (DRE) and is called the Jeetzel Valley Railway (Jeetzeltalbahn).

== Lüchow-Salzwedel (1891) ==
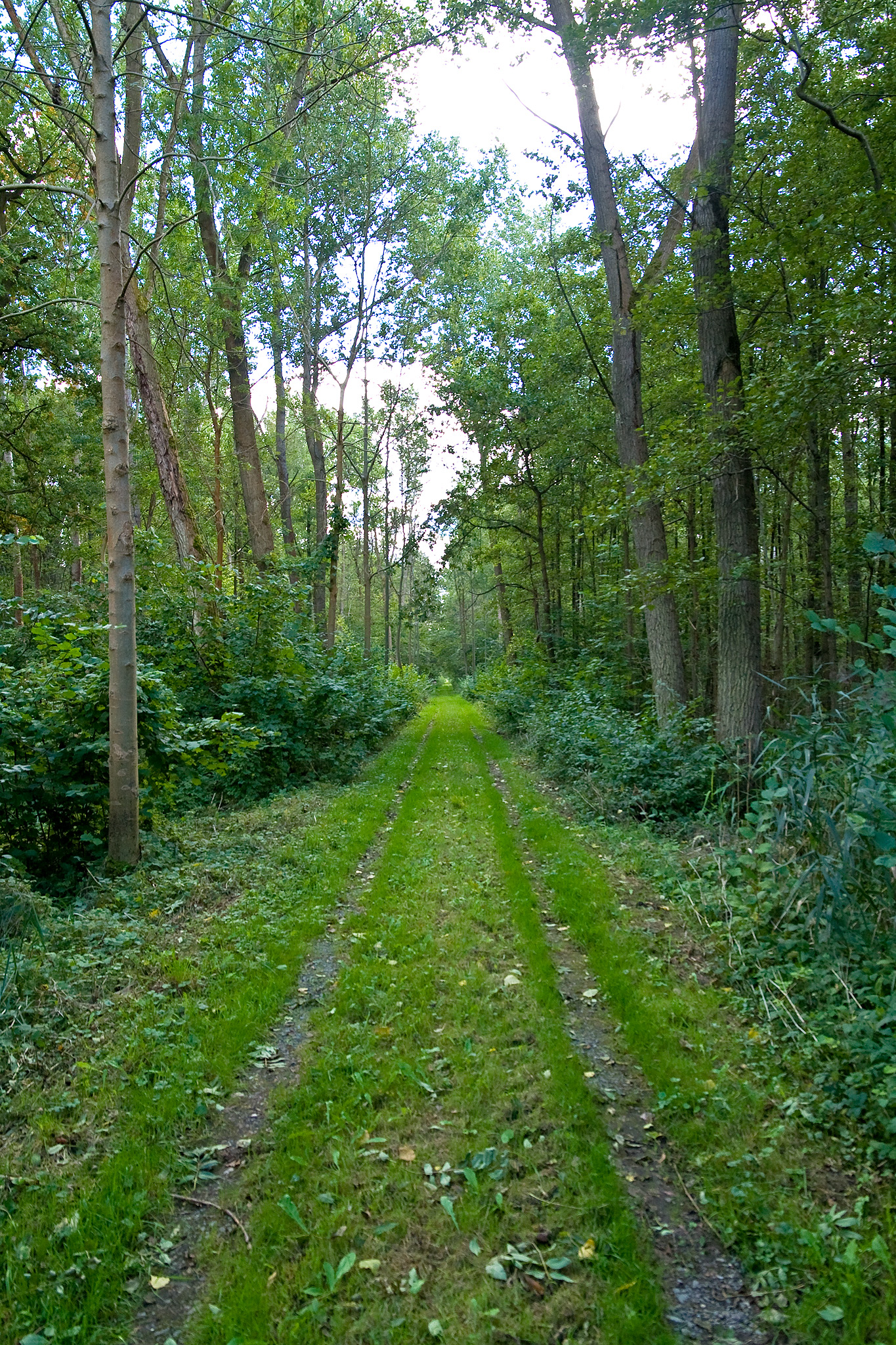
Footpath on the old railway embankment in the forest near Hoyersburg.

In the 1860s two railways were planned that would enable a direct connection between Berlin and Bremen. In both cases, a route via Lüchow was under discussion. The branch line Wittenberge-Buchenholz was built via Dannenberg, however, and then the Stendal-Langwedel line via Salzwedel. After the opening of this route in April 1873 Lüchow therefore asked to build a branch line to Salzwedel. It was 18 years before construction began on this spur track. The line from Oebisfelde to Salzwedel was the first to be built and was opened by the Prussian state railways in 1889. The construction of the branch to Lüchow began in 1891. Work over the open country progressed rapidly. Only between the subsequent halt of Bürgerholz and Lübbow did marshy terrain have to be crossed. In early March, the track to Wustrow was completed and by 22 April 1891 it had reached Lüchow. It was taken over by the state police on 28 September 1891 and opened on 1 October. The station at Lübbow could not be used immediately, because the community refused to supply the paving stones and the embankment for the link road to the station. The decision was first taken in 1892, so that the first train did not call at Lübbow until 1 May 1892, eight months after the opening of the line.

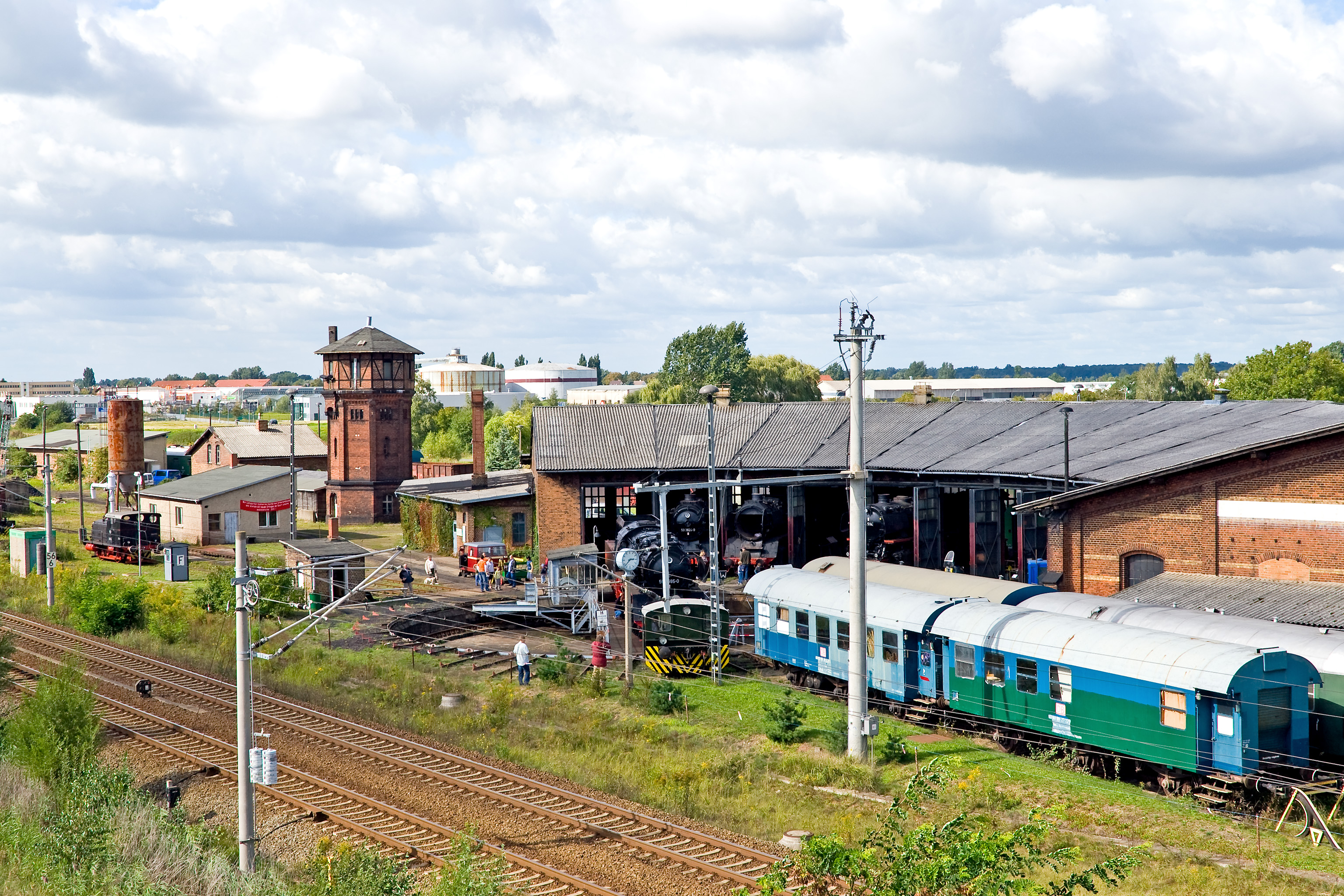
Salzwedel shed. In front, the America Line tracks.

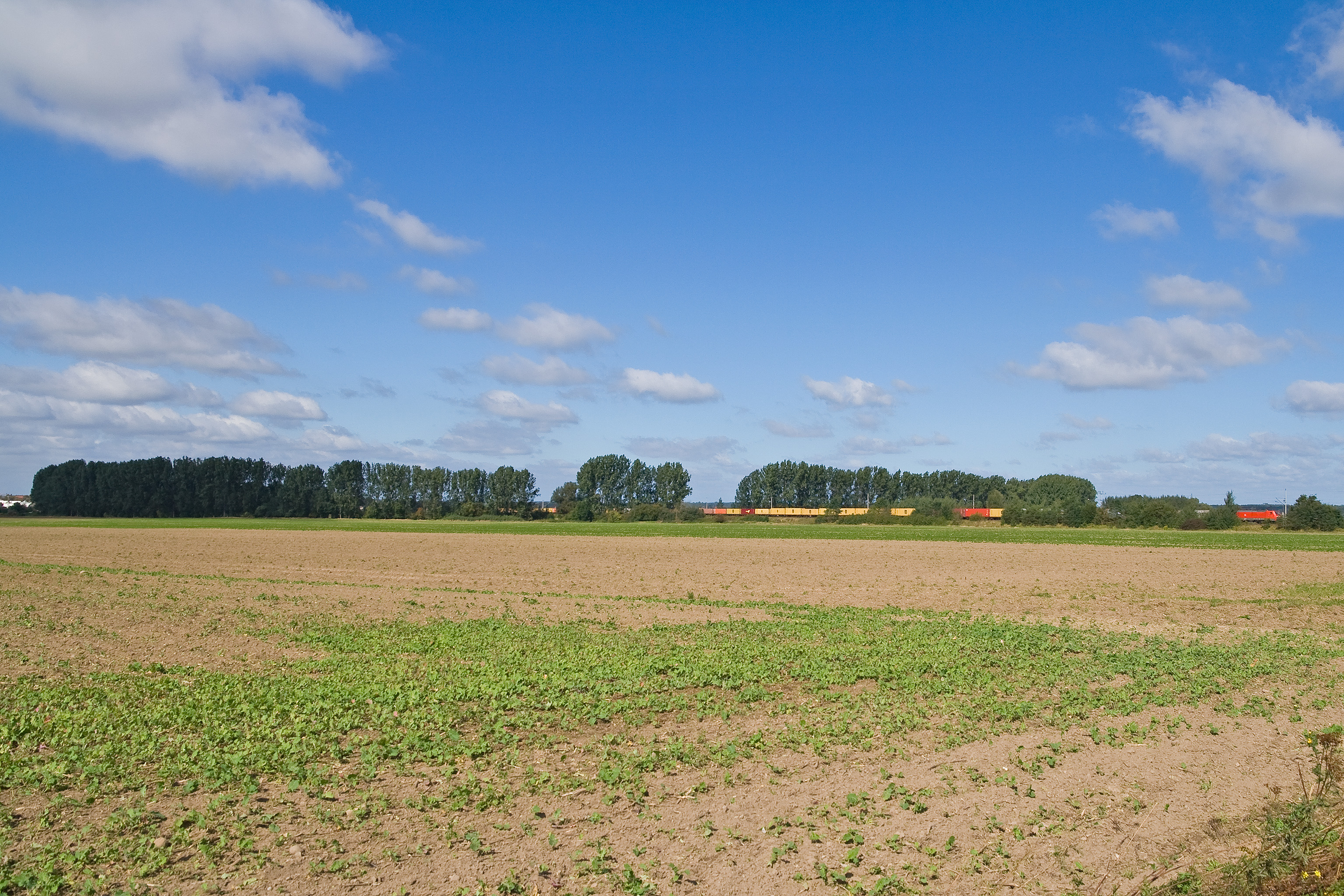
The row of trees marks the dismantled Salzwedel–Lübbow section below the America Line, which is being worked by a goods train to Stendal.

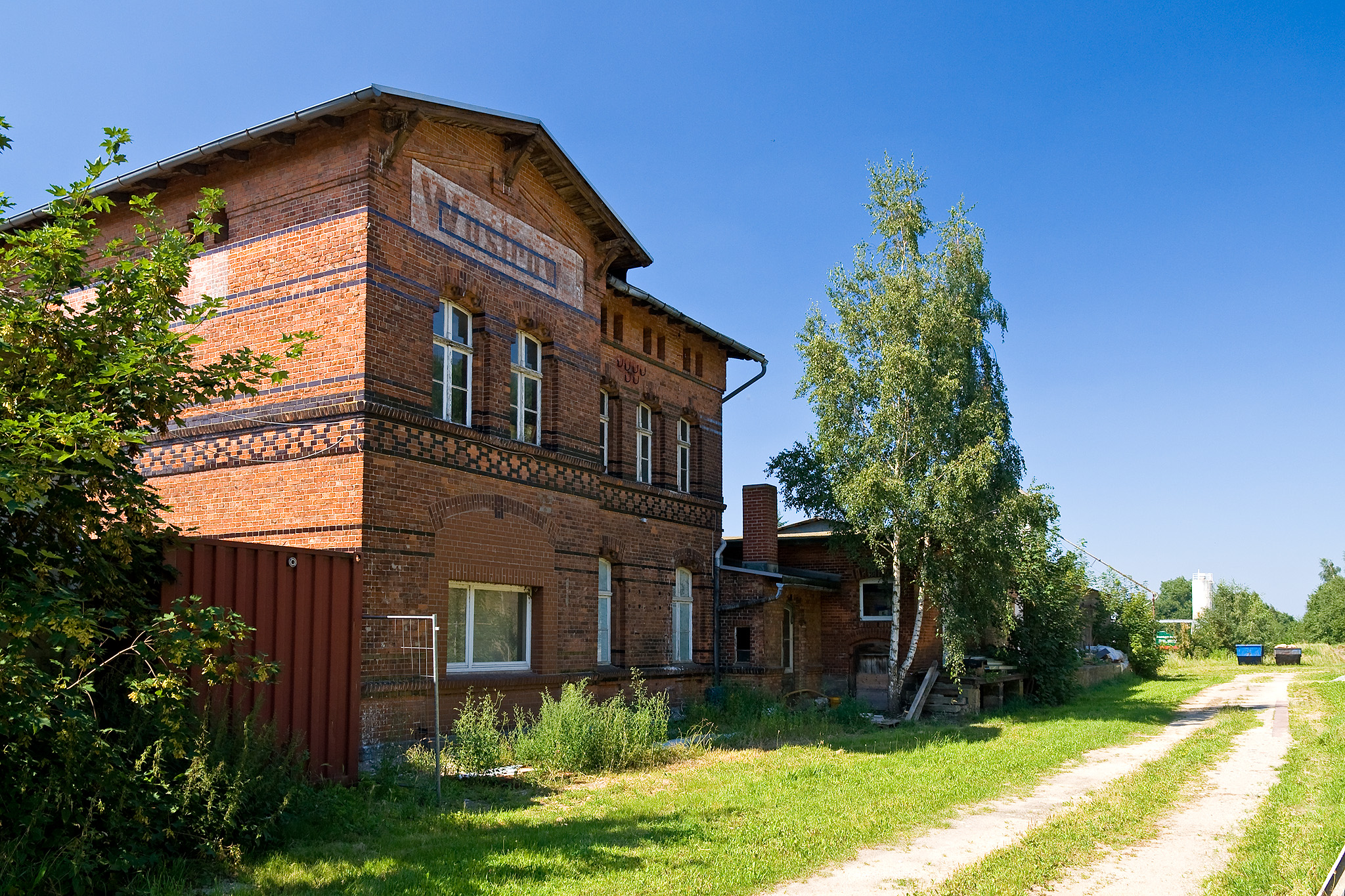
The old station building in Wustrow. The tracks end behind the blue containers by the silo.

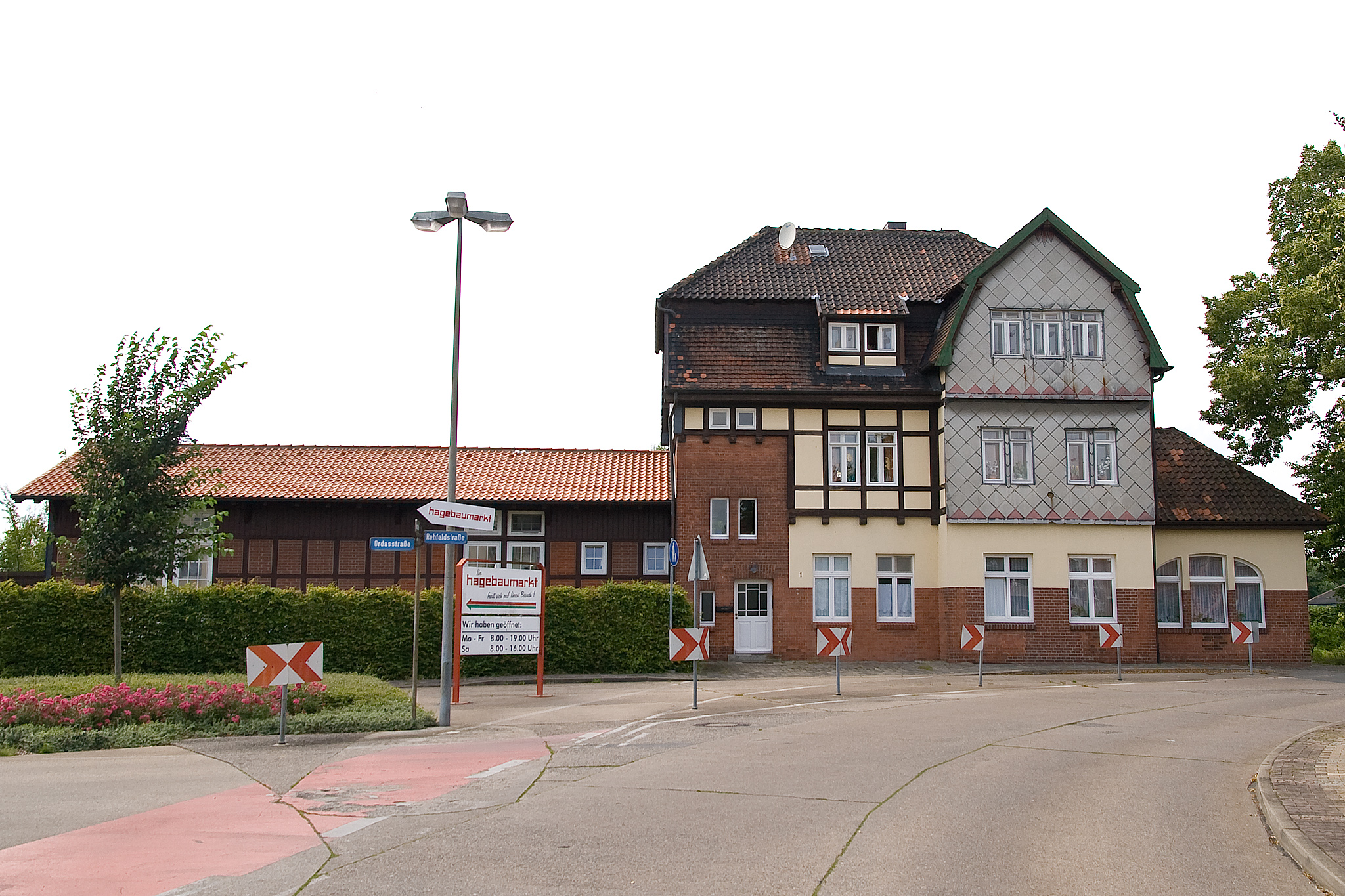
The old station at Dannenberg West; now a house.

== Sources ==
- Ulrich Bornmüller, Dr. Rolf Meyer (Red.): Eisenbahnzeit im Wendland: Beiträge zur Eisenbahngeschichte des Landkreises Lüchow-Dannenberg. Hartmut Geller, Museumsverein Wustrow e.V., 1990, ISBN 3-925861-06-8
