= Kakerbeck =

- Stadtteil of Kalbe
- Interactive map of Kakerbeck
- Location within Germany Location within Saxony-Anhalt
- Coordinates: 52°40′00″N 11°17′00″E
- Country: Germany
- State: Saxony-Anhalt
- District: Altmarkkreis Salzwedel
- Town: Kalbe

Area
  - Total: 26.83 km^{2} (10.36 sq mi)
- Elevation: 52 m (171 ft)

Population (2006-12-31)
  - Total: 921
  - Density: 34.3/km^{2} (88.9/sq mi)
- Time zone: UTC+01:00 (CET)
  - Summer (DST): UTC+02:00 (CEST)
- Postal codes: 39624
- Dialling codes: 039081
- Vehicle registration: SAW

Kakerbeck is a village and a former municipality in the district Altmarkkreis Salzwedel, in Saxony-Anhalt, Germany.

Since 1 January 2010, it is part of the town Kalbe.
