= Brunau =

- Stadtteil of Kalbe
- Interactive map of Brunau
- Location within Germany Location within Saxony-Anhalt
- Coordinates: 52°45′00″N 11°28′00″E
- Country: Germany
- State: Saxony-Anhalt
- District: Altmarkkreis Salzwedel
- Town: Kalbe

Area
  - Total: 16.05 km^{2} (6.20 sq mi)
- Elevation: 37 m (121 ft)

Population (2006-12-31)
  - Total: 638
  - Density: 39.8/km^{2} (103/sq mi)
- Time zone: UTC+01:00 (CET)
  - Summer (DST): UTC+02:00 (CEST)
- Postal codes: 39624
- Dialling codes: 039030
- Vehicle registration: SAW

Brunau (German pronunciation: [ˈbʁuːnaʊ]) is a village and a former municipality in the district Altmarkkreis Salzwedel, in Saxony-Anhalt, Germany.

Since 1 January 2010, it is part of the town Kalbe.
