= Arendsee =

- Town
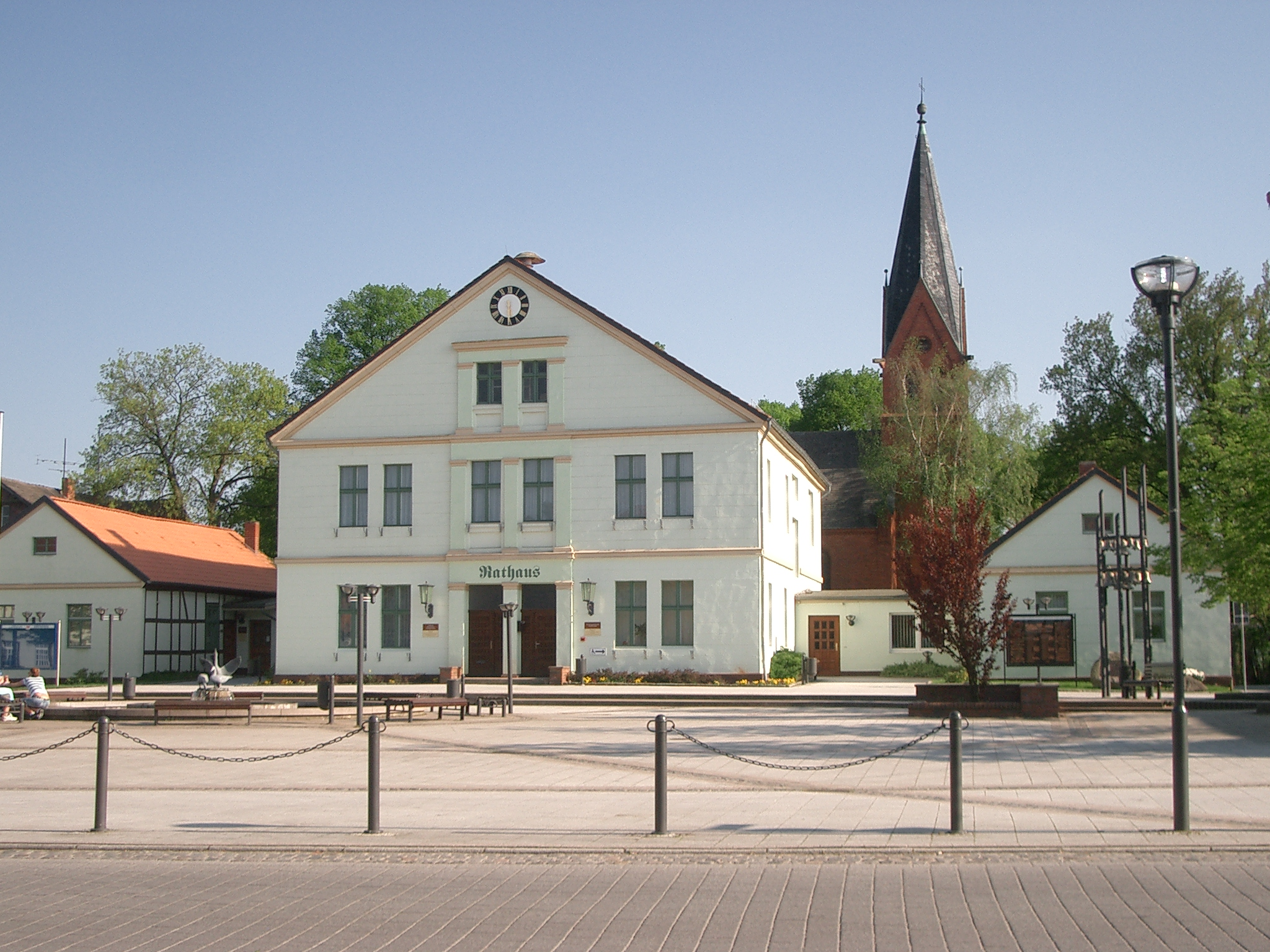
- Town hall

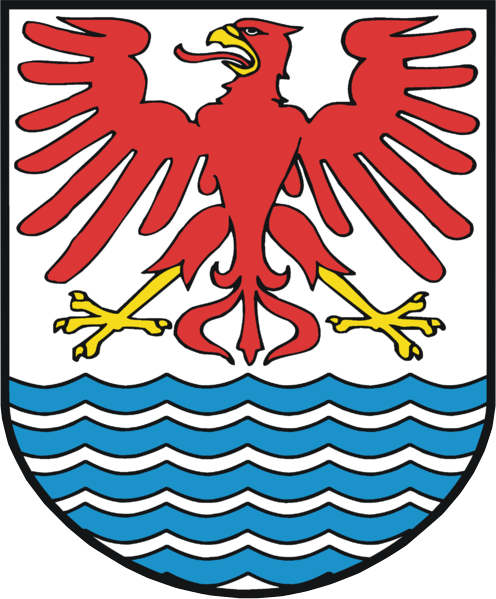
- Coat of arms

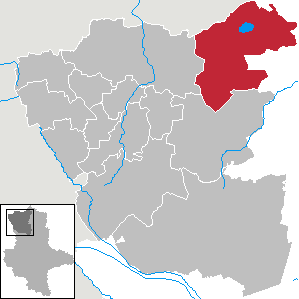
- Location of Arendsee within Altmarkkreis Salzwedel district
- Interactive map of Arendsee
- Location within Germany Location within Saxony-Anhalt
- Coordinates: 52°52′36″N 11°29′12″E
- Country: Germany
- State: Saxony-Anhalt
- District: Altmarkkreis Salzwedel

Government
  - Mayor (2023–30): Norman Klebe (CDU)

Area
  - Total: 269.68 km^{2} (104.12 sq mi)
- Elevation: 25 m (82 ft)

Population (2025-12-31)
  - Total: 6,188
  - Density: 22.95/km^{2} (59.43/sq mi)
- Time zone: UTC+01:00 (CET)
  - Summer (DST): UTC+02:00 (CEST)
- Postal codes: 39619
- Dialling codes: 039003, 039034, 039036, 039384
- Vehicle registration: SAW, GA, KLZ
- Website: www.stadt-arendsee.eu

Arendsee (German pronunciation: [ˈaːʁɛntˌzeː]) is a town in the Altmarkkreis Salzwedel, Saxony-Anhalt, Germany. It is named after the lake Arendsee, located north of the town.

== Geography ==
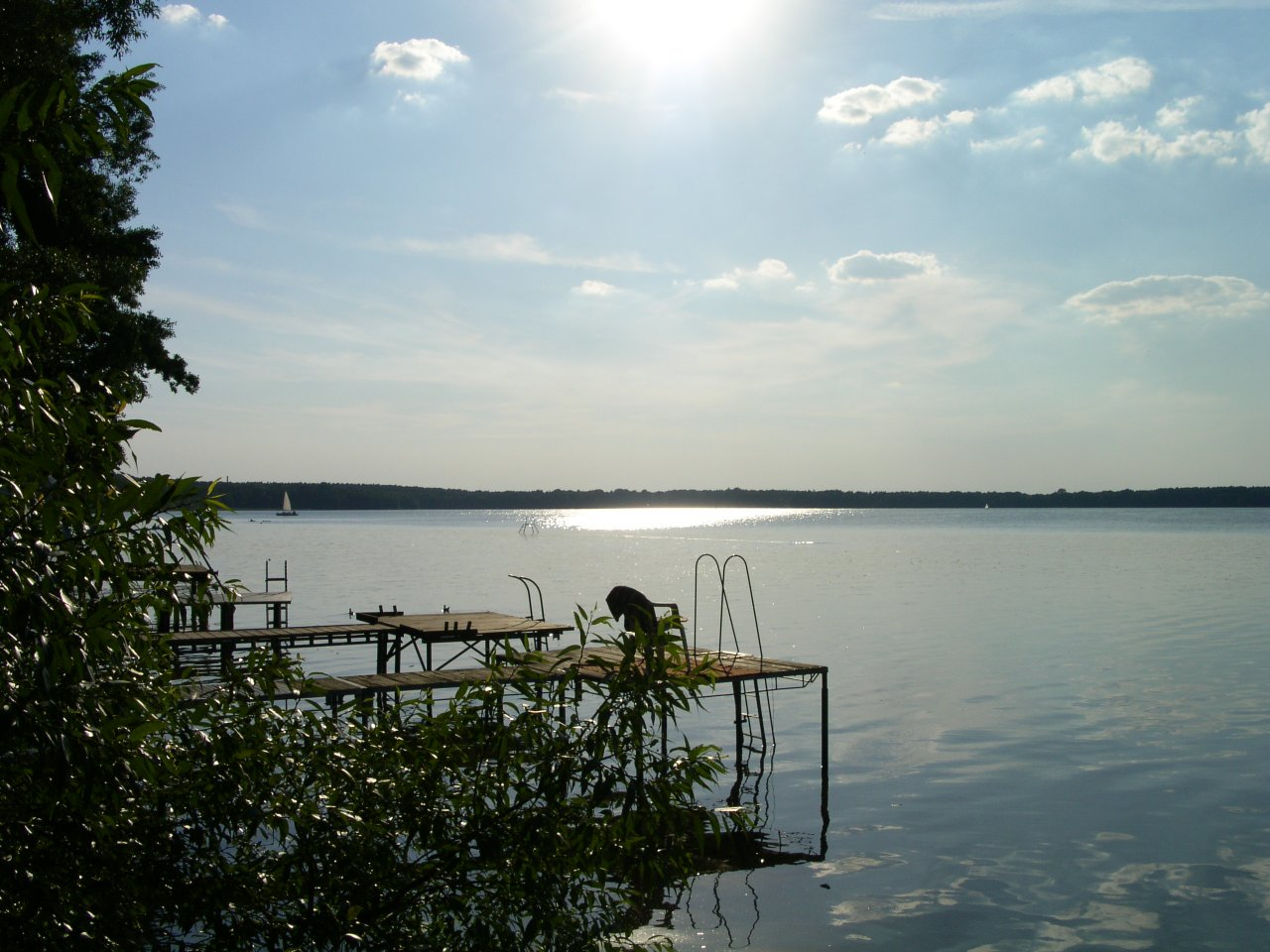
Arendsee

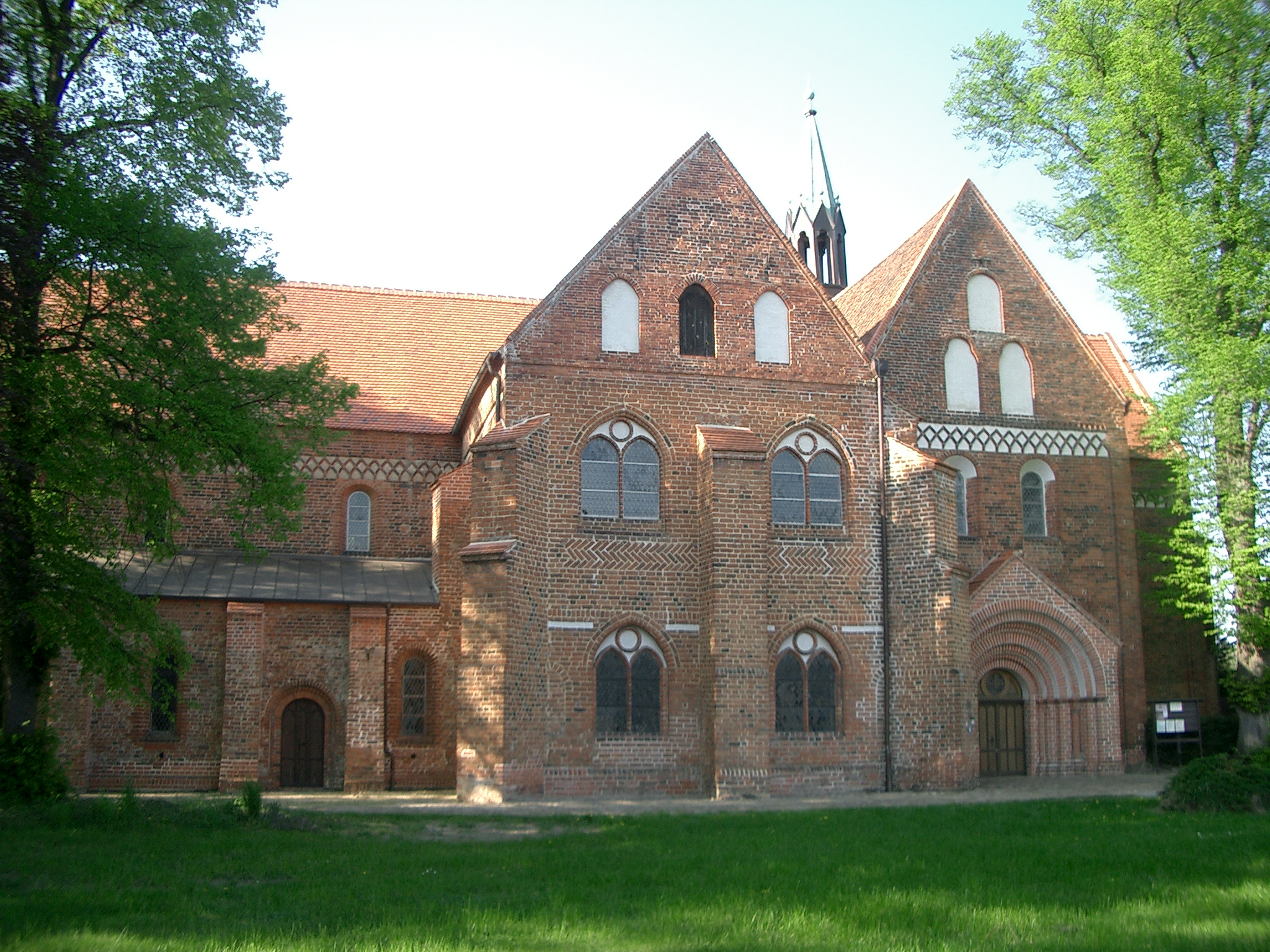
Monastery church

The municipality is located in the Altmark region and on the southern bank of the Arendsee lake, the largest and deepest natural lake in Saxony-Anhalt.

=== Subdivisions ===
The town Arendsee consists of Arendsee proper (including the Ortsteile Genzien and Gestien) and the following Ortschaften or municipal divisions:

- Binde (incl. Ritzleben)
- Fleetmark (incl. Lüge, Molitz, Störpke)
- Höwisch
- Kaulitz
- Kerkau (incl. Lübbars)
- Kläden (incl. Kraatz)
- Kleinau (incl. Dessau, Lohne)
- Leppin (incl. Harpe, Zehren)
- Mechau
- Neulingen
- Rademin (incl. Ladekath)
- Sanne-Kerkuhn (Sanne and Kerkuhn)
- Schrampe (incl. Zießau)
- Thielbeer (incl. Zühlen)
- Vissum (incl. Kassuhn, Schernikau)
- Ziemendorf

== History ==
The locality and the lake were first mentioned in the Royal Frankish Annals in 822.

In 1184 Otto I, Margrave of Brandenburg founded a Benedictine nunnery in Arendsee while the then competent Prince-Bishop of Verden, Tammo (d. 1188), endowed it with estates.

The former municipalities Binde, Höwisch, Kaulitz, Kerkau, Kläden, Kleinau, Leppin, Neulingen, Sanne-Kerkuhn, Schrampe, Thielbeer and Ziemendorf were merged into Arendsee on 1 January 2010. The former municipalities Fleetmark, Mechau, Rademin, and Vissum were merged into Arendsee on 1 January 2011.

== Population development ==
Year	Inhabitants
1964	10.963
1971	10.802
1981	9.401
1990	8.597
2000	8.223
2010	7.381

Year	Inhabitants
2011	7.237
2012	7.176
2013	7.056
2014	7.023
2015	6.929

1964–1981 census results, from 2011: 2011 European Union census
