= Braunschweig meteorite =

Meteorite that hit Germany in 2013

Braunschweig
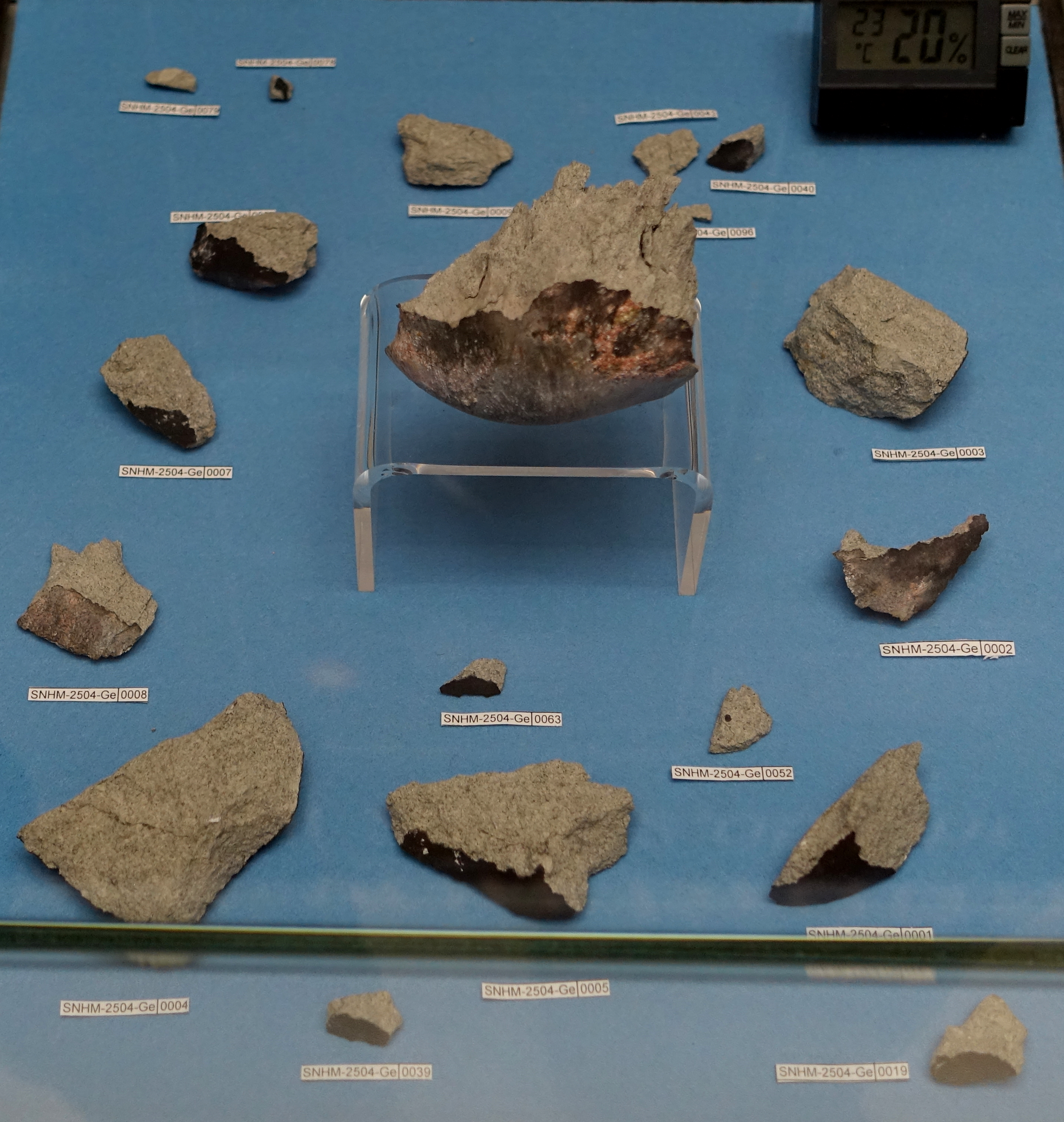
- Fragments of the meteorite at the State Natural History Museum, Braunschweig
- Type: Chondrite
- Class: Ordinary chondrite
- Group: L6
- Shock stage: S4
- Weathering grade: W0 (pristine)
- Country: Germany
- Region: Lower Saxony
- Coordinates: 52°13′33″N 10°31′12″E
- Observed fall: Yes
- Fall date: 23 April 2013, 02:05 CET (UTC+01:00)
- Found date: 23 April 2013
- TKW: 1.3 kg (2.9 lb)
- Related media on Wikimedia Commons

The Braunschweig meteorite is a 1.3 kilograms (2.9 pounds) meteorite that hit Melverode, a suburb in Braunschweig, Germany, at around 2:05 AM on 23 April 2013. It hit the concrete pavement in front of the home of Erhard Seemann, breaking into hundreds of fragments on impact, the largest of which is 214 grams (0.472 pounds). The meteorite created a small impact crater in the concrete, with a diameter of 7 cm (2.8 in) and a depth of 3 cm (1.2 in).

== Composition and classification ==
The meteorite has been classified as an L6 ordinary chondrite.

== Impact ==
The meteorite fell at around 2:05 AM on 23 April 2013, with an estimated velocity of 250 km/h (160 mph). It hit concrete pavement 3 m (9.8 ft) from Erhard Seemann's front door, breaking into hundreds of fragments upon impact. The largest fragment, with a mass of 214 grams, stuck in the concrete, forming an impact crater with a diameter of 7 cm (2.8 in) and a depth of 3 cm (1.2 in). Fragments of concrete ejected from the impact were as wide as 5 cm (2.0 in). Many other fragments of the meteorite were found within 18 m (59 ft) from the impact crater by several people. Traces of a secondary impact were found at a nearby brick wall in the form of indents 1 cm (0.39 in) wide. A total of 1.3 kg (2.9 lb) of fragments were found.

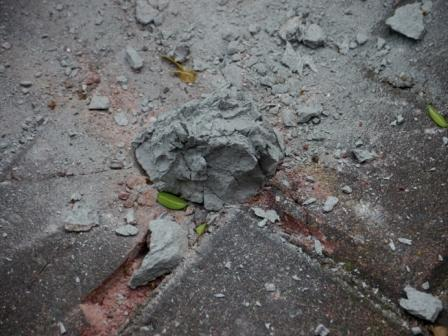
The impact crater containing the meteorite's largest fragment, with a mass of 214 grams.

== Reports ==
A neighbor reported hearing a strong hum and "whoosh" followed by a loud crash at around 2:10 AM, and then found four fragments of the meteorite on his driveway. In Ahlum, 8 km (5.0 mi) from the impact site, Julian Mascow reported a bright flare approaching from the southeast for 1–2 seconds, with a luminosity "like dawn," before ending in a "short tracer just over his head." He heard a loud explosion about 90 seconds later followed by a rumbling noise. Mark Vornhusen's web camera documented the fireball from Vechta, located about 160 km (99 mi) from Braunschweig. The light meter of a weather station in Brandenburg, approximately 240 km (150 mi) from Braunschweig, recorded 5 seconds of brightening. The Technical University of Braunschweig informed expert Rainer Bartoschewitz of the reports, who inspected the site on April 27 and confirmed the meteorite.
