= Shadoof =

Irrigation tool

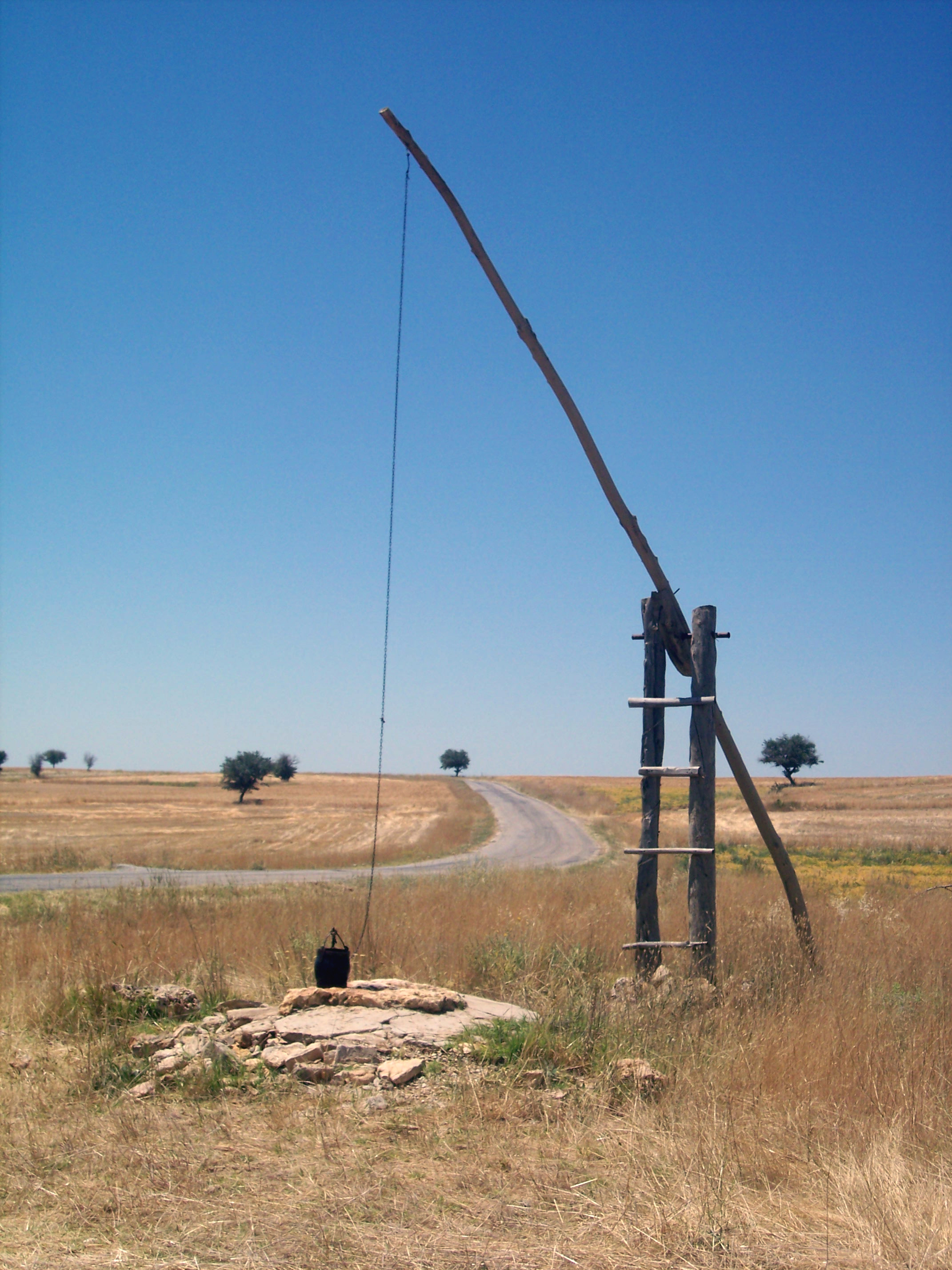
Well pole in central Anatolia, Turkey

A shadoof (or shaduf, well pole, well sweep, sweep, swape, or simply a lift) is a tool that is used to lift water from a well or another water source onto land or into another waterway or basin. It is highly efficient, and has been known since ancient times.

The mechanism of a shadoof comprises a long counterbalanced pole on a pivot, with a bucket attached to the end of it. It is generally used in a crop irrigation system using basins, dikes, ditches, walls, canals, and similar waterways.

== History ==
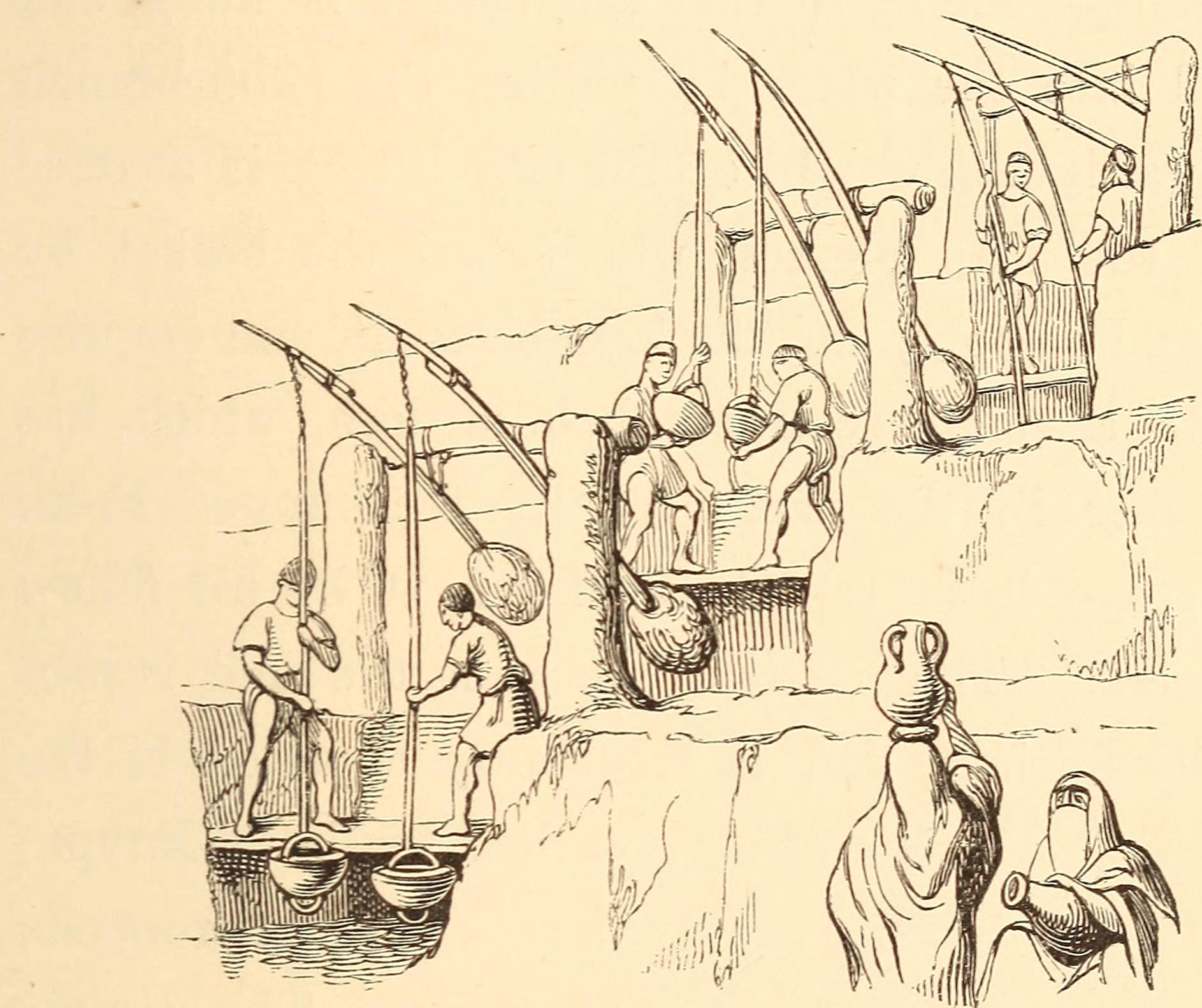
Multi-level shadoof system in Egypt

One theory states that the shadoof was invented in Mesopotamia as early as the time of Sargon of Akkad (around 24th and 23rd centuries BCE). The earliest evidence of this technology is a cylindrical seal with a depiction of a shadoof dating back to about 2200 BCE. Then, it is believed that the Minoans adopted this technology; evidence suggests the use of shadoofs as early as around 2100–1600 BCE. The shadoof appeared in Upper Egypt sometime after 2000 BC, most likely during the 18th Dynasty. Around the same time, the shadoof reached China.

Some historians believe the Egyptians were the original inventors of the shadoof. The theory states that the shadoof originated along the Nile, using tomb drawings illustrating shadoofs at Thebes dating from 1250 BCE as evidence.

An alternative origin theory states that shadoof originated from India around the same time as in Mesopotamia. This theory owes to the fact that the shadoof was well spread in India; however, there is little to no other evidence that makes this theory any stronger.

It is still used in many areas of Africa and Asia and is very common in rural areas of India and Pakistan, such as the Bhojpuri belt of the Ganges plain. In Europe, they remain common in countries like Ukraine, Belarus, Poland and Germany. In the Great Hungarian Plain they are considered a symbol of the region.

== Design, construction, and efficiency ==
The shadoof is easy to construct and is highly efficient in use. It consists of an upright frame on which is suspended a long pole or branch, at a distance of about one-fifth of its length from one end. At the long end of this pole hangs a bucket, skin bag, or bitumen-coated reed basket. The bucket can be made in many different styles, sometimes having an uneven base or a part at the top of the skin that can be untied. This allows the water to be immediately distributed rather than manually emptied. The short end carries a weight made of clay, stone, or a similar material, which serves as the counterpoise of a lever. The bucket can be lowered by the operator using their own weight to push it down; the counterweight then raises the full bucket without effort.

The implementations vary from region to region. The frame can consist of a single pole or a pair, and the buckets can be attached in multiple different ways, from being tied to a rope to being attached to a thinner stick.

With an almost effortless swinging and lifting motion, the waterproof vessel can be used to scoop up and carry water from a body of water (typically, a river or pond) onto land or to another body of water. At the end of each movement, the water is emptied out into runnels that convey the water along irrigation ditches in the required direction. The device is capable of lowering the force levels required of operators to the extent that the performance tends to be limited by the energy processing capacity of the operator and not necessarily muscle fatigue.

The shadoof has a lifting range of 1 to 6 meters. A study of efficiency in various sites in Chad has shown that one man can lift 39 to 130 liters per minute over heights of 1.8 to 6.2 m, resulting in water-lifting power levels of 26.7 to 60.1 W. Its efficiency has been calculated at 60%.

A study done in Nigeria also indirectly assessed energy usage through heart rate, serving as the physiological metric. Through this approach, it was discovered that making suitable adjustments to the shadoof decreased energy consumption from approximately 109 to 71 watts (equivalent to 6.56 to 4.27 kilojoules per minute). This reduction enables a farmer to engage in prolonged work without necessitating frequent rest breaks.

== Social effects ==
Across numerous cultures, shadoofs have symbolized collective effort. In ancient Egypt and Mesopotamia, for instance, the multi-tiered shadoof systems allowed the movement of water to higher levels through teamwork. Together with other irrigation technologies, shadoofs not only helped establish reliable methods of agriculture for growing civilizations but also influenced cultural elements.

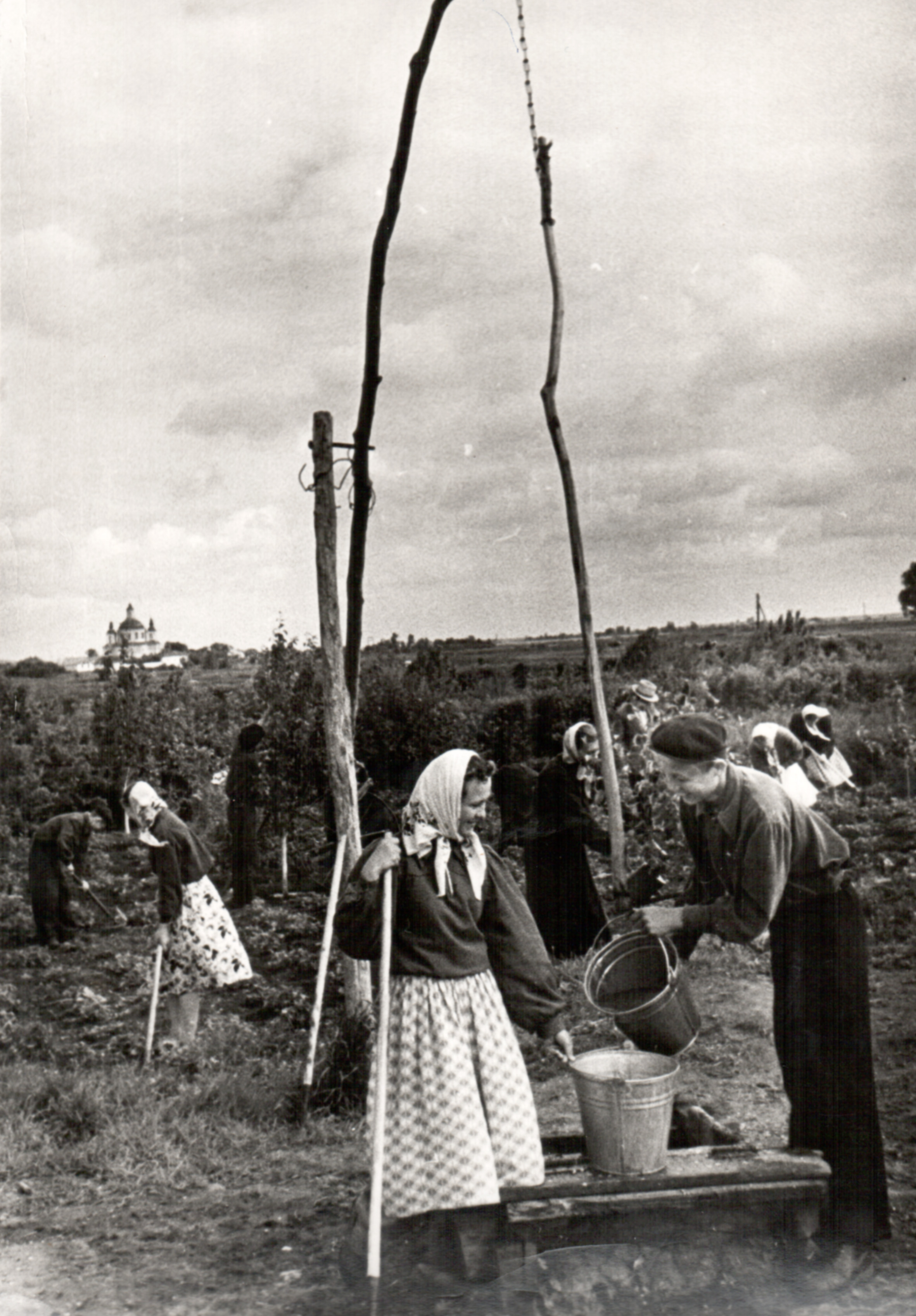
Well pole in Baidivka, Ukraine (1950)

The accessibility and utilization of shadoofs have been linked to class. During the Egyptian Middle Empire and the New Kingdom, pleasure gardens featuring shadoof irrigation became a hallmark of luxury residences and consequently a status symbol. Although not directly, shadoofs contributed to creating a class system, a barrier for some. At the same time, shadoofs have remained essential for those with limited resources to support their livelihoods on large-scale farms around the Nile. Even in the present day, many communities worldwide lack access to more sophisticated water technologies, making shadoofs an indicator of socio-economic standing and a certain measure of societal development. The technology's reliability, despite its antiquity, often gets overlooked.

The geographic spread of shadoofs is impressive. In regions where irrigation is imperative, such as Egypt, India, and parts of sub-Saharan Africa, shadoofs have played a crucial role in enabling agriculture to thrive in water-scarce areas. Shadoofs have empowered marginalized communities by providing them with the means to secure their sustenance, breaking the barrier of food insecurity even in the modern age.

Gender roles have also undergone a transformation, with women frequently assuming shadoof operation. The ease of use of the shadoof empowered women to play a more active role in farming. It is fair to acknowledge that shadoofs contributed to normalizing women's increased independence and participation in less physically demanding, and therefore more “socially acceptable”, aspects of food production.

The ease of use of the shadoof is perhaps its most important feature. Studies have shown that it is impressively efficient, given the simplicity of its design. Still, it is essential to recognize that shadoofs, while easing the physical demands of water retrieval, require manual labor, posing a barrier for individuals with certain physical disabilities.

== Names ==
- Shadoof or shaduf comes from the Arabic word شادوف, šādūf.
- It is also called a lift, well pole, well sweep, or simply a sweep in the US. A less common English translation is swape.
- Picotah (or picota) is a Portuguese loan word.
- It is also called a jiégāo (桔槹) in Chinese.
- The Tamil name is thulla (துலா), while the Telugu name is ethaamu (ఏతాము) or ethamu (ఏతము).
- It was also known by the Ancient Greek name kēlōn (κήλων) or kēlōneion (κηλώνειον); this term (קילון) is also borrowed in Mishnaic Hebrew.
- In Ukrainian, it is called krynychnyi zhuravel (криничний журавель, "well crane") for its shape; it is also known as zvid (звід).
- In Hungarian, it is known as gémeskút (literally, "heron wells").
- In Croatian, it is known as đeram (from Turkish, germe).

== Gallery ==
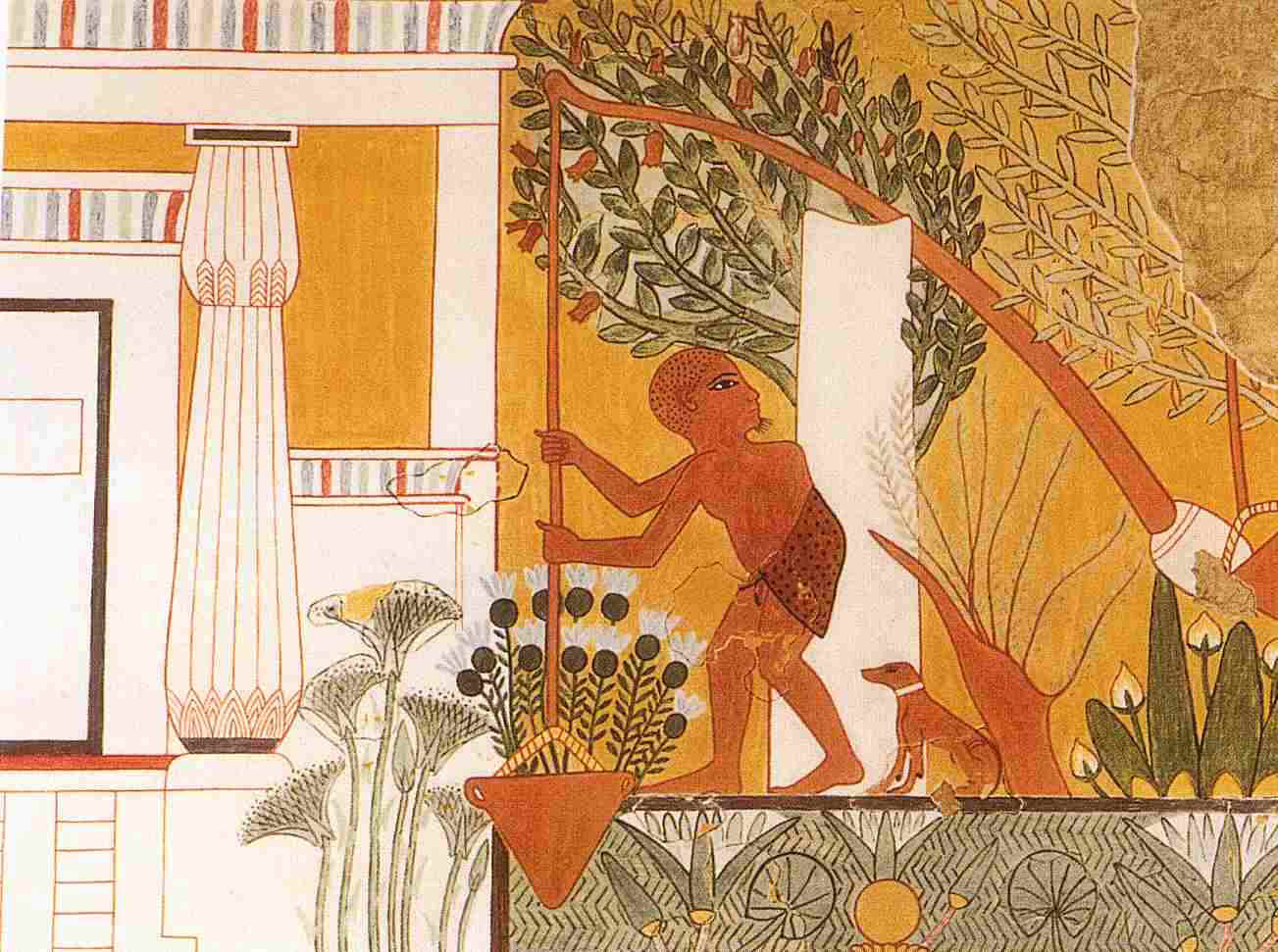
Ancient wall painting in Egypt

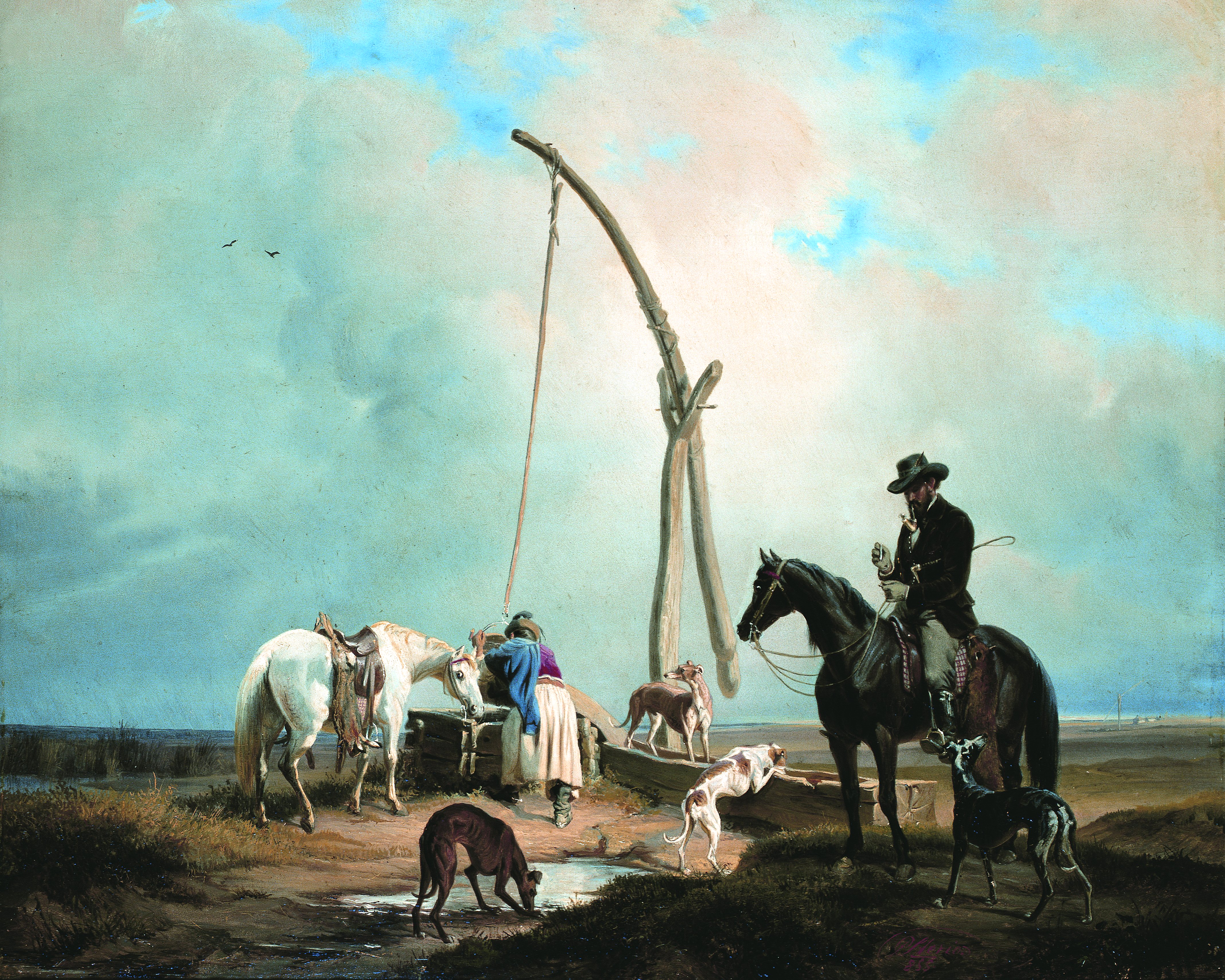
Painting by Károly Sterio, 1855

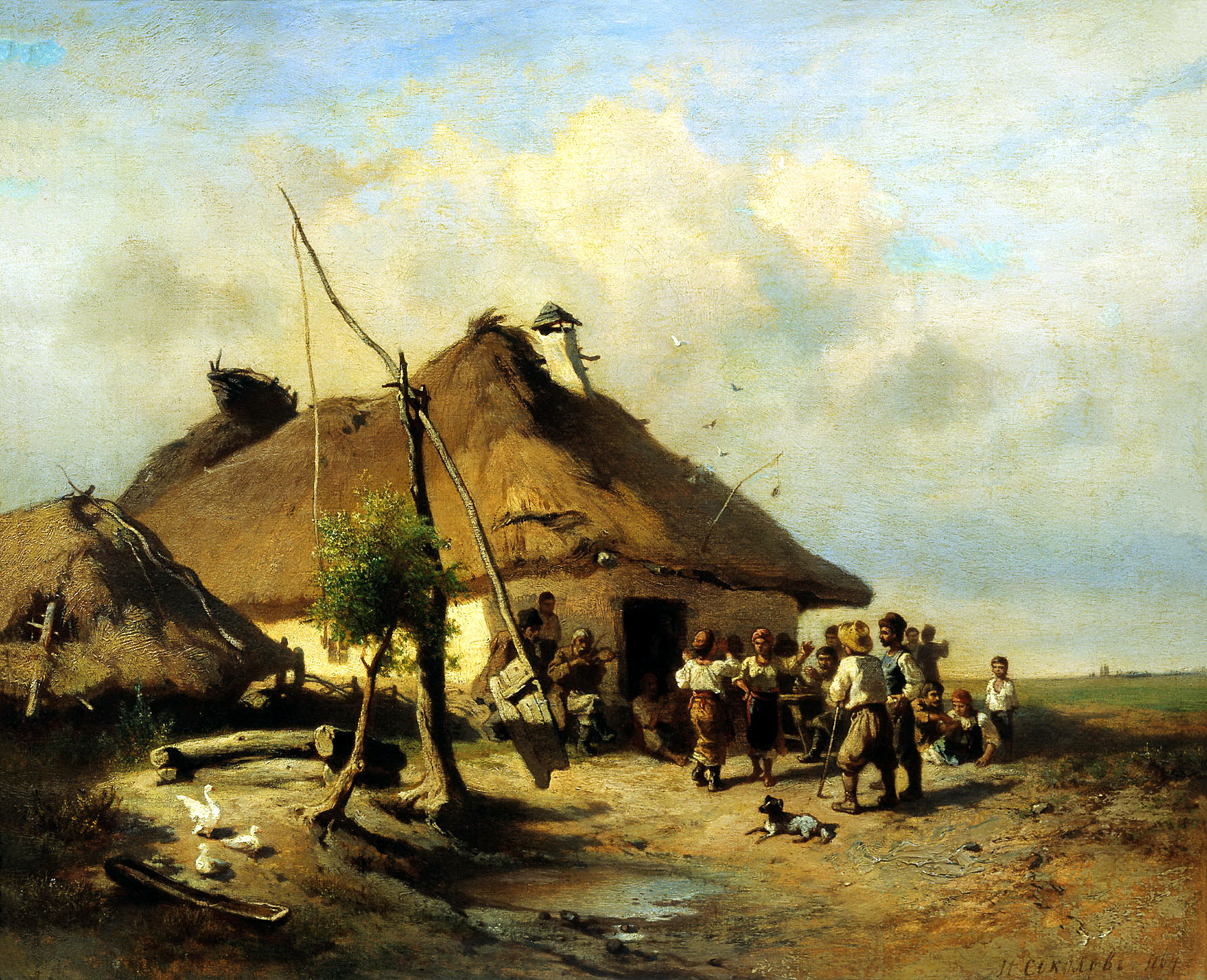
Painting by Ivan Sokolov, 1864

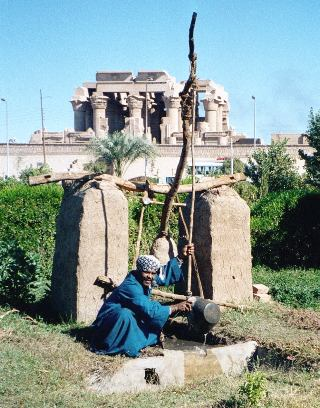
Shadoof in Egypt

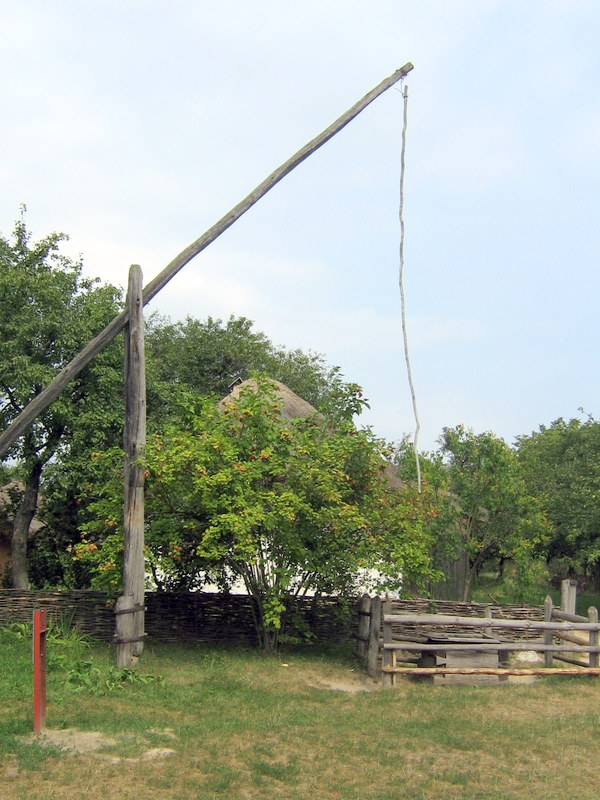
Well sweep in Pyrohiv Museum, Ukraine

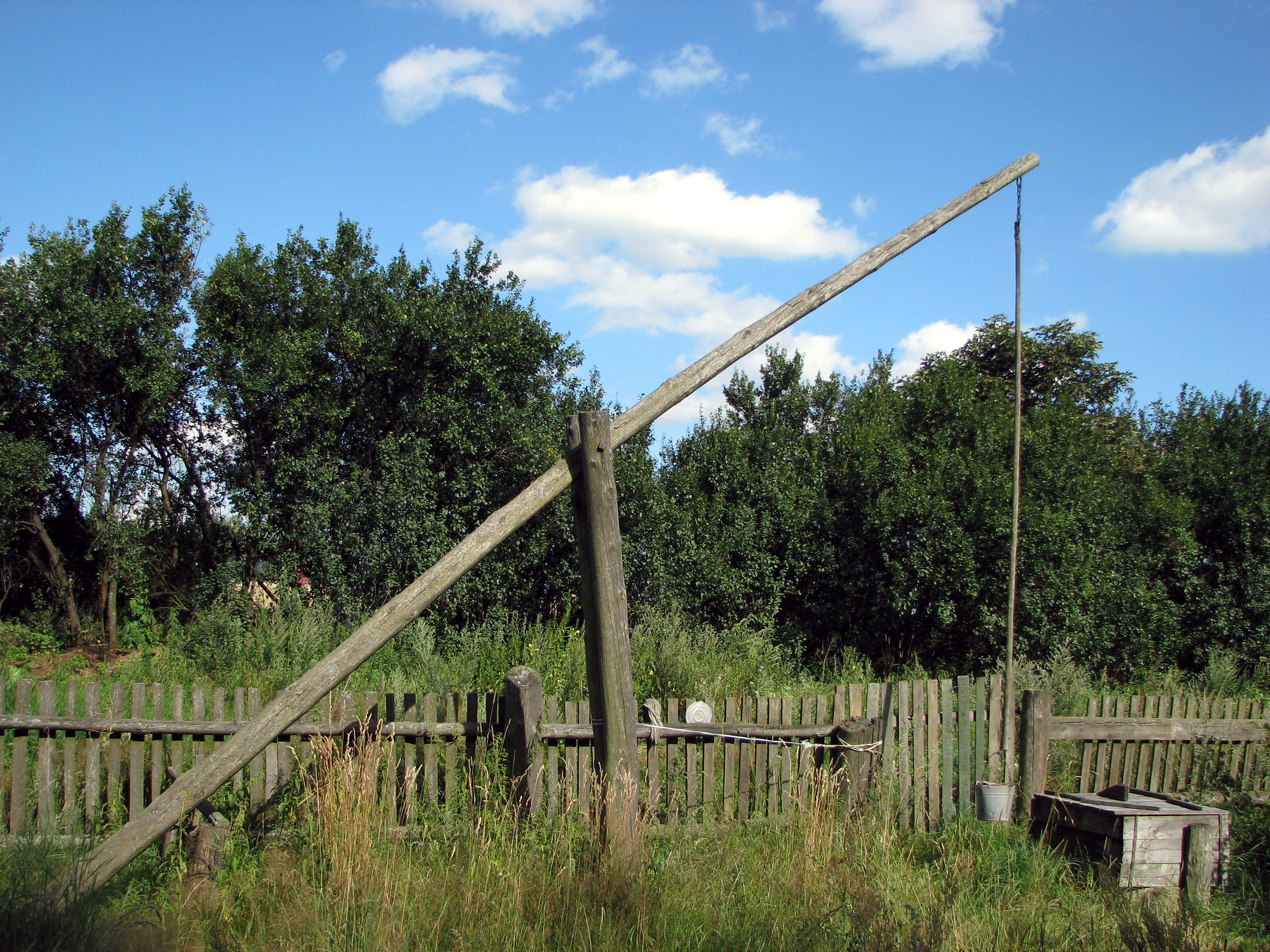
Well sweep in Belarus

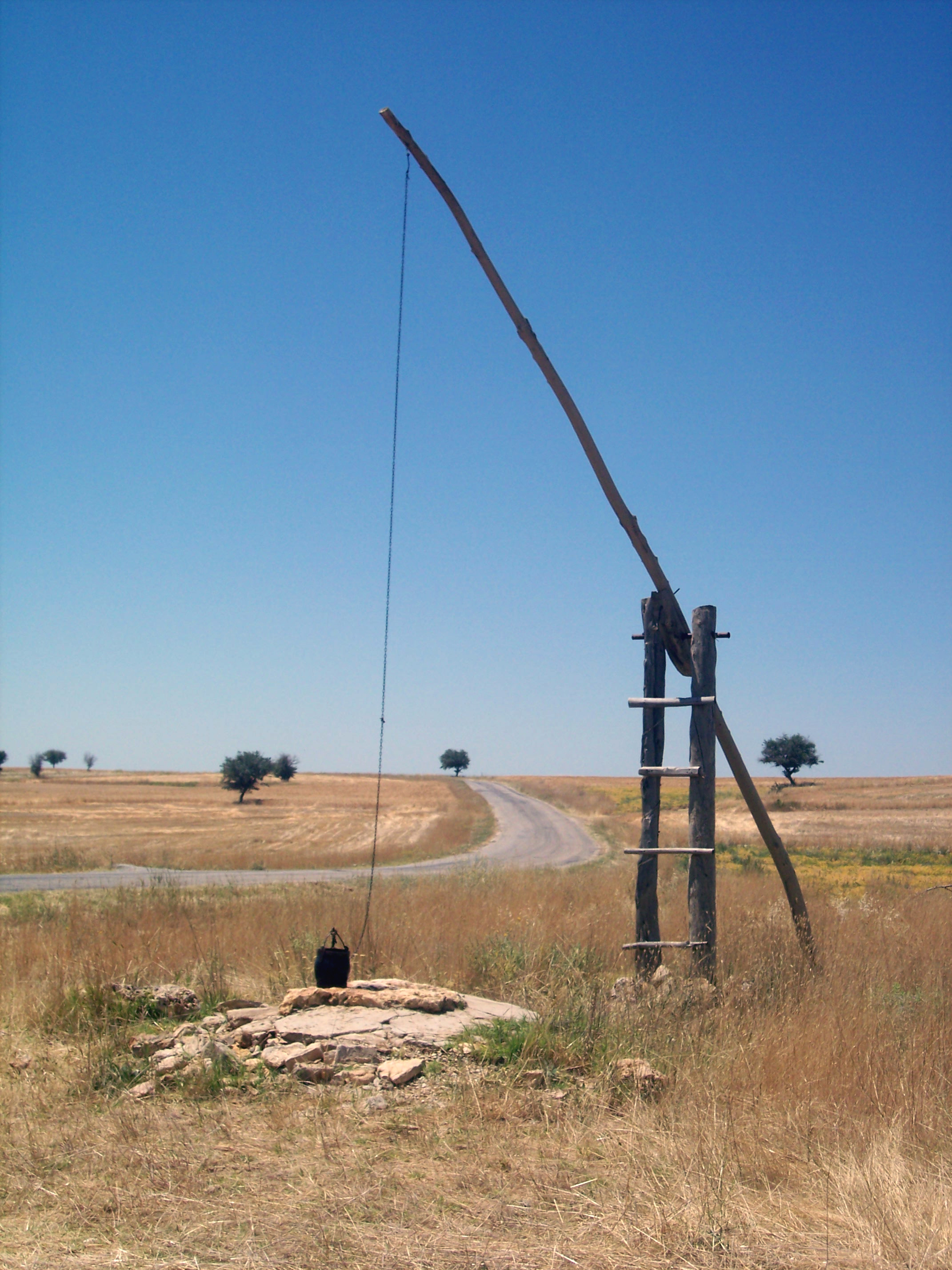
Shadoof in Turkey

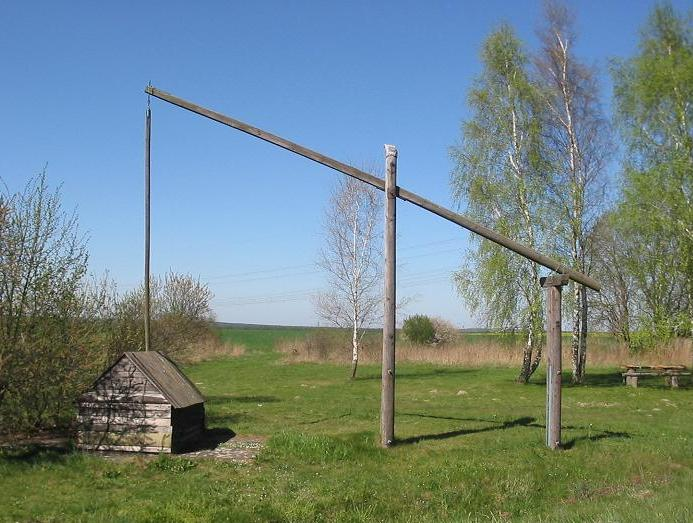
Well sweep in Germany

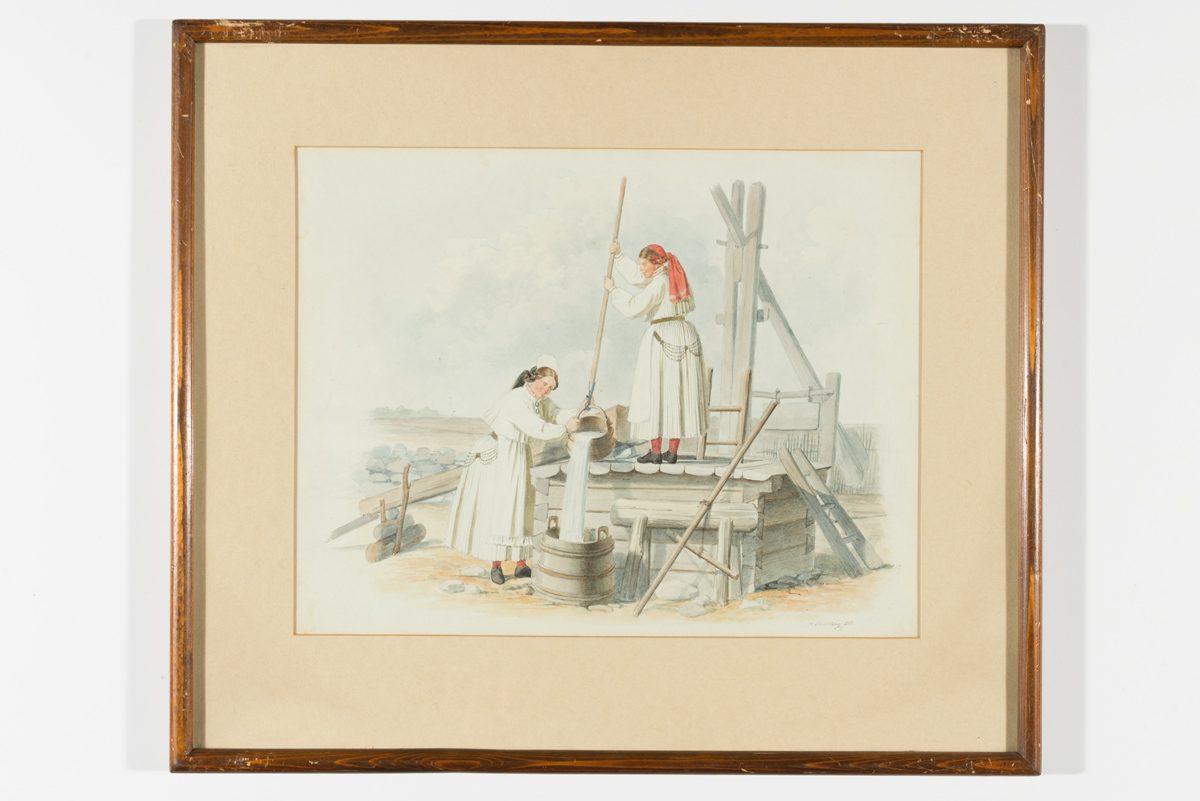
Painting by Ernst Hermann Schlichting, 1852

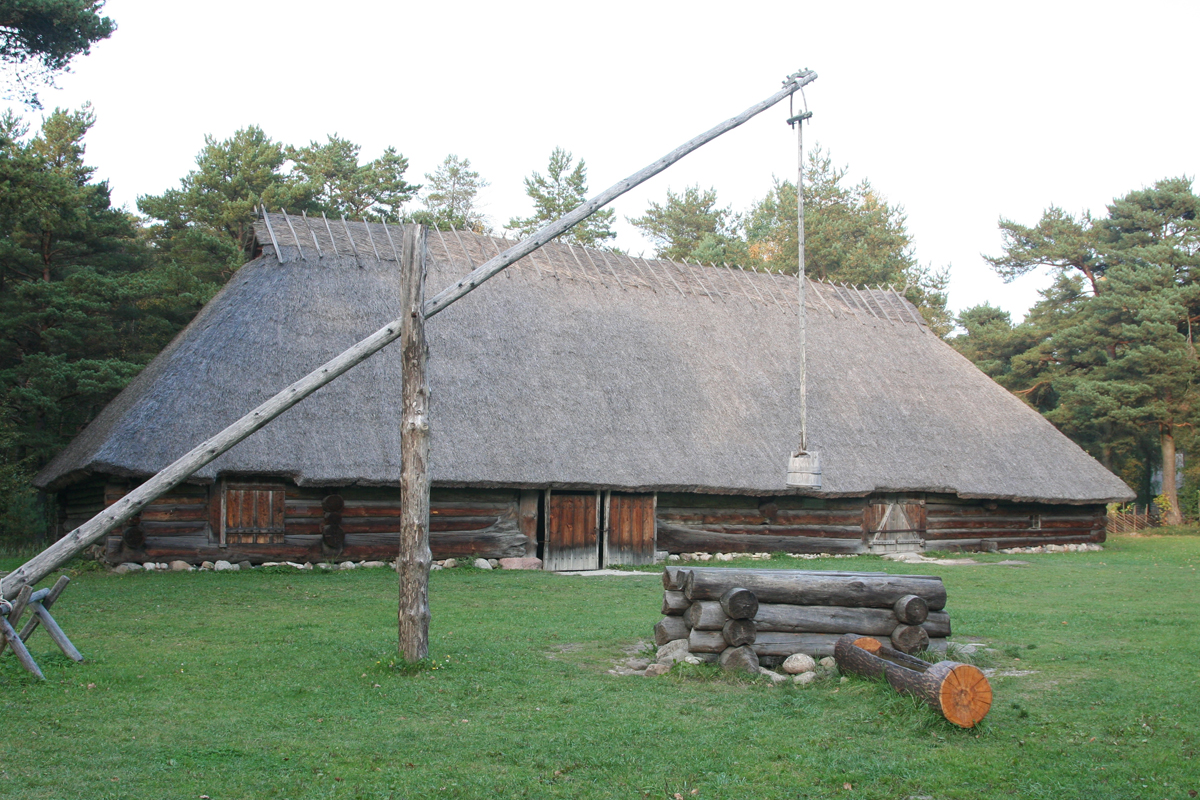
Reconstructed 19th century well sweep in the Estonian Open Air Museum

== In heraldry ==
The use of shadoofs in certain areas influenced heraldry. Below are some examples of heraldic elements of various subdivisions.

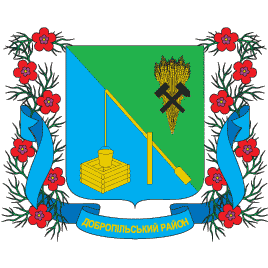
Dobropilsky raion, Donetsk oblast

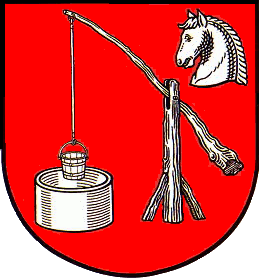
Börnsen, Germany

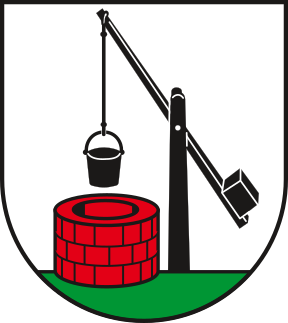
Born, Germany

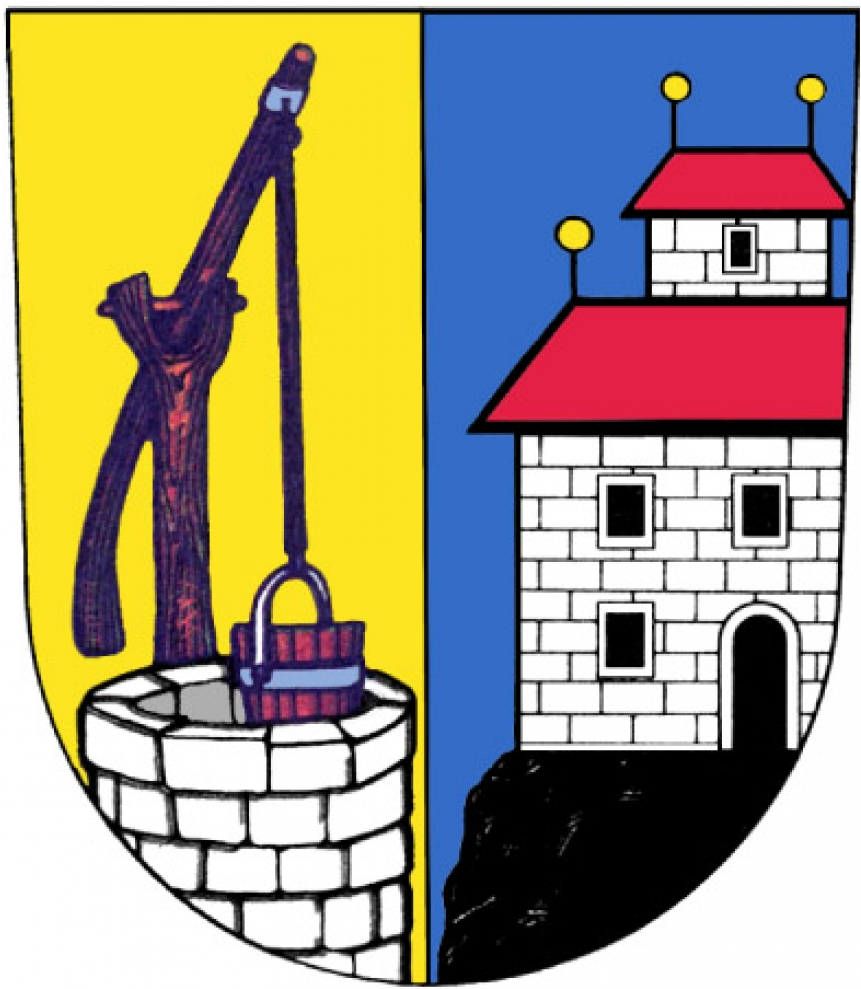
Holice, Czechia
