= Jübar =

- Municipality
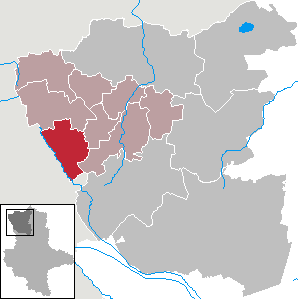
- Location of Jübar within Altmarkkreis Salzwedel district
- Interactive map of Jübar
- Location within Germany Location within Saxony-Anhalt
- Coordinates: 52°41′24″N 10°54′48″E
- Country: Germany
- State: Saxony-Anhalt
- District: Altmarkkreis Salzwedel
- Municipal assoc.: Beetzendorf-Diesdorf

Government
  - Mayor (2023–30): Carsten Borchert

Area
  - Total: 70.89 km^{2} (27.37 sq mi)
- Elevation: 75 m (246 ft)

Population (2025-12-31)
  - Total: 1,505
  - Density: 21.23/km^{2} (54.99/sq mi)
- Time zone: UTC+01:00 (CET)
  - Summer (DST): UTC+02:00 (CEST)
- Postal codes: 29413, 38489
- Dialling codes: 039003
- Vehicle registration: SAW
- Website: www.beetzendorf-diesdorf.de

Jübar is a municipality in the district Altmarkkreis Salzwedel, in Saxony-Anhalt, Germany. Since 1 January 2010 it has incorporated the former municipalities of Bornsen, Hanum, Lüdelsen and Nettgau.
