= Bonese =

- Ortsteil of Dähre
- Interactive map of Bonese
- Location within Germany Location within Saxony-Anhalt
- Coordinates: 52°49′00″N 10°50′36″E
- Country: Germany
- State: Saxony-Anhalt
- District: Altmarkkreis Salzwedel
- Town: Dähre

Area
  - Total: 10.52 km^{2} (4.06 sq mi)
- Elevation: 53 m (174 ft)

Population (2006-12-31)
  - Total: 275
  - Density: 26.1/km^{2} (67.7/sq mi)
- Time zone: UTC+01:00 (CET)
  - Summer (DST): UTC+02:00 (CEST)
- Postal codes: 29413
- Dialling codes: 039039
- Vehicle registration: SAW

Bonese is a village and a former municipality in the district Altmarkkreis Salzwedel, in Saxony-Anhalt, Germany. Since 1 January 2009, it is part of the municipality of Dähre.

The municipality of Bonese was originally laid out as a village green, and consisted of the three districts of Bonese, Rustenbeck and Winkelstedt. The municipalities of Bonese and Dähre formed the Hans-Jochen-Winkel.
