= Tangeln =

- Ortsteil of Beetzendorf
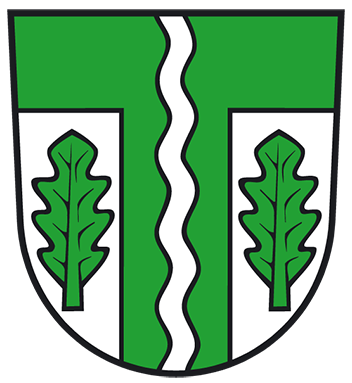
- Coat of arms
- Interactive map of Tangeln
- Location within Germany Location within Saxony-Anhalt
- Coordinates: 52°40′00″N 11°10′00″E
- Country: Germany
- State: Saxony-Anhalt
- District: Altmarkkreis Salzwedel
- Town: Beetzendorf

Area
  - Total: 19.01 km^{2} (7.34 sq mi)
- Elevation: 78 m (256 ft)

Population (2006-12-31)
  - Total: 387
  - Density: 20.4/km^{2} (52.7/sq mi)
- Time zone: UTC+01:00 (CET)
  - Summer (DST): UTC+02:00 (CEST)
- Postal codes: 38489
- Dialling codes: 039007
- Vehicle registration: SAW

Tangeln is a village and a former municipality in the district Altmarkkreis Salzwedel, in Saxony-Anhalt, Germany. Since 1 January 2009, it is part of the municipality Beetzendorf.
