= Siedenlangenbeck =

- Ortsteil of Kuhfelde
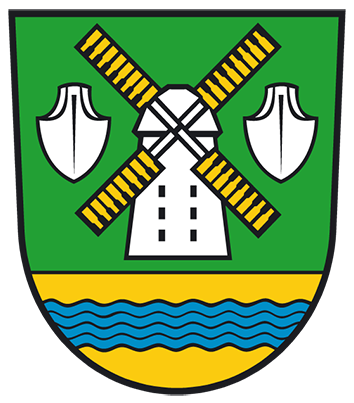
- Coat of arms
- Interactive map of Siedenlangenbeck
- Location within Germany Location within Saxony-Anhalt
- Coordinates: 52°45′00″N 11°05′48″E
- Country: Germany
- State: Saxony-Anhalt
- District: Altmarkkreis Salzwedel
- Town: Kuhfelde

Area
  - Total: 18.55 km^{2} (7.16 sq mi)
- Elevation: 36 m (118 ft)

Population (2006-12-31)
  - Total: 466
  - Density: 25.1/km^{2} (65.1/sq mi)
- Time zone: UTC+01:00 (CET)
  - Summer (DST): UTC+02:00 (CEST)
- Postal codes: 29416
- Dialling codes: 039035
- Vehicle registration: SAW

Siedenlangenbeck is a village and a former municipality in the district Altmarkkreis Salzwedel, in Saxony-Anhalt, Germany. Since 1 July 2009, it is part of the municipality Kuhfelde.
