= State Natural History Museum =

Coordinates: 52°16′31″N 10°31′46″E

Staatliches Naturhistorische Museum in Braunschweig
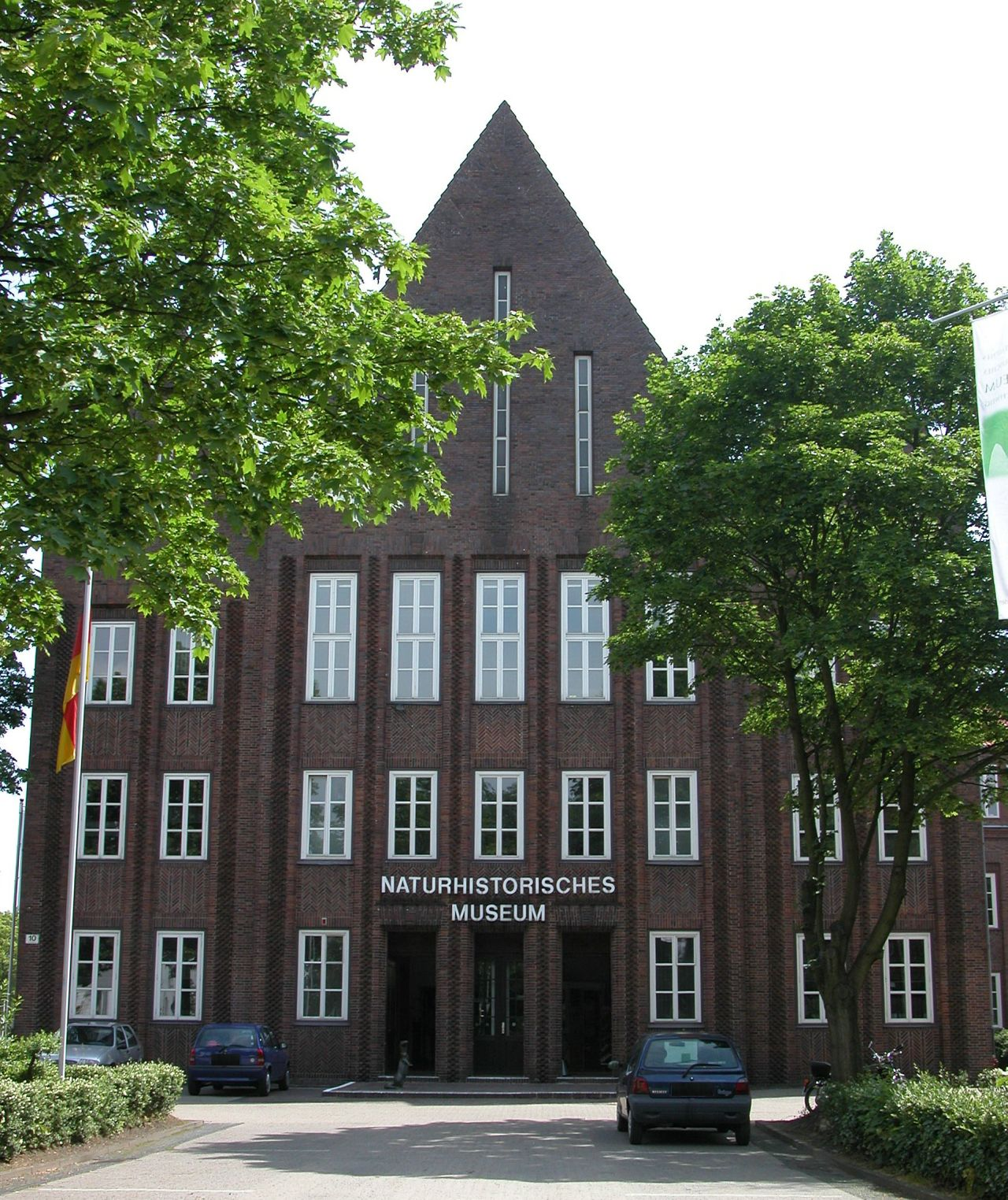
- Front façade and main entrance
- Established: 1754
- Location: Pockelsstraße 10; 38106 Braunschweig, Germany
- Type: Natural history museum
- Website: 3landesmuseen-braunschweig.de/en/staatliches-naturhistorisches-museum

The State Natural History Museum (German: Staatliches Naturhistorisches Museum) in Braunschweig, Germany, is a museum of natural history and zoology. It was founded in 1754, and is Germany's oldest such museum.

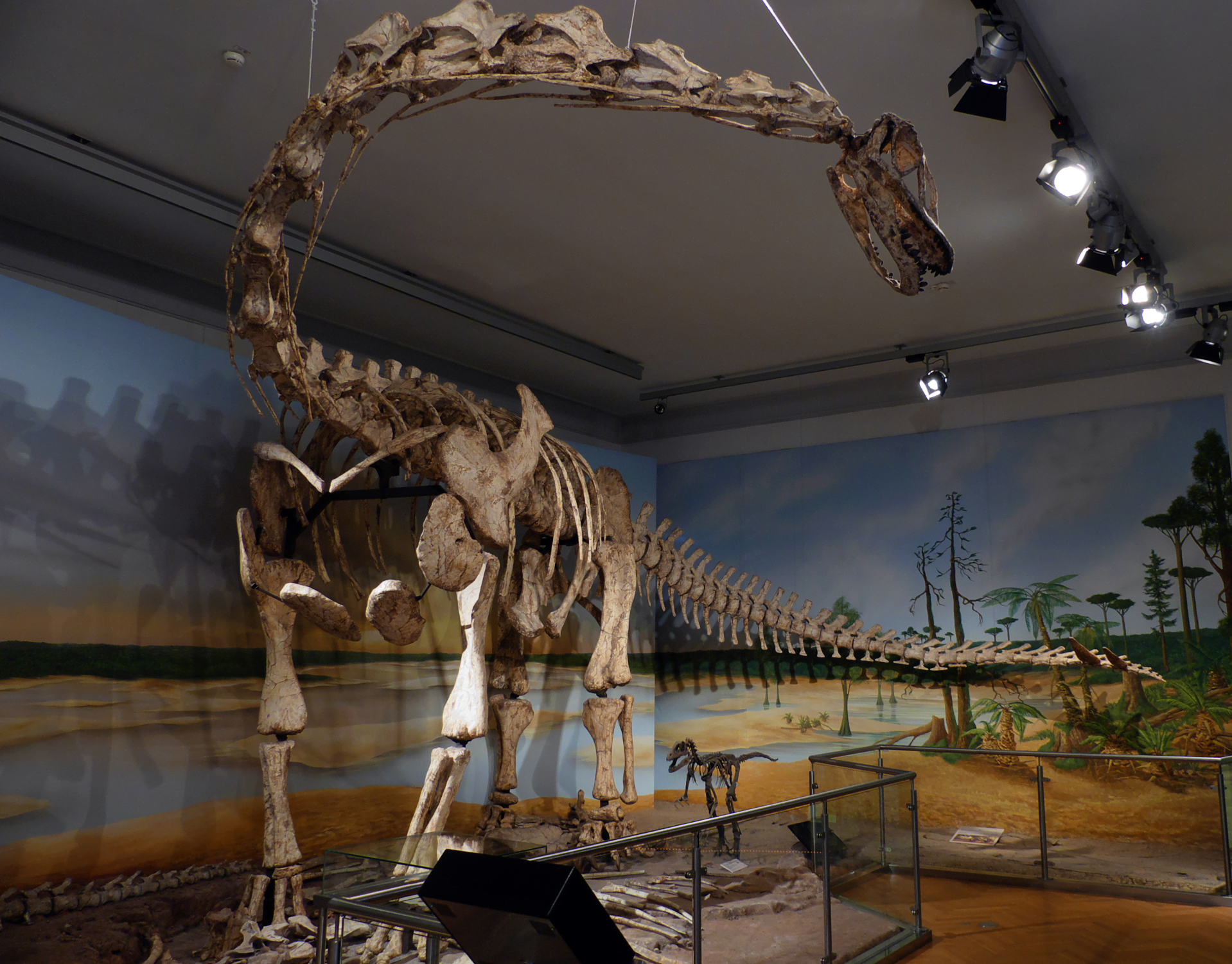
Mounted Spinophorosaurus on display in the museum.

== Collections ==
The scientific collections include 3,000 mammal specimens, 50,000 bird specimens, 10,300 bird eggs, 4,000 skulls and skeletons, and 1,000 fish, amphibian, and reptile specimens. Insects are represented by 80,000 Lepidoptera and 85,000 Coleoptera, and it has 100,000 mollusca and 5,000 other fossils. The public displays include an aquarium, dioramas, and exhibitions of birds, mammals, insects, fossils, and meteorites.

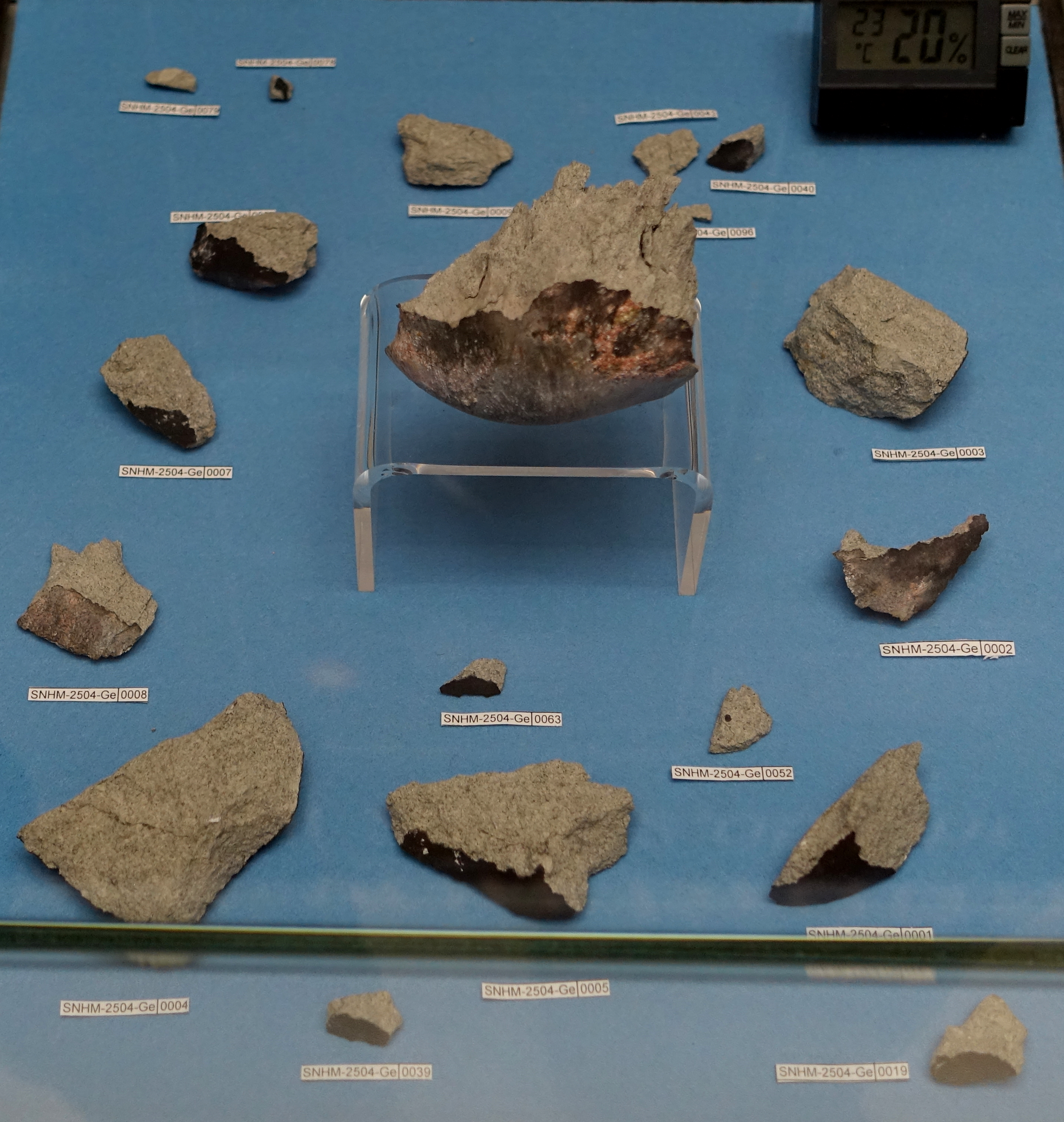
Fragments of the Braunschweig meteorite on display

== See also ==
- List of museums in Germany
- List of natural history museums
