= Valfitz =

- Ortsteil of Kuhfelde
- Interactive map of Valfitz
- Location within Germany Location within Saxony-Anhalt
- Coordinates: 52°45′59″N 11°07′00″E
- Country: Germany
- State: Saxony-Anhalt
- District: Altmarkkreis Salzwedel
- Town: Kuhfelde

Area
  - Total: 7.17 km^{2} (2.77 sq mi)
- Elevation: 42 m (138 ft)

Population (2006-12-31)
  - Total: 151
  - Density: 21.1/km^{2} (54.5/sq mi)
- Time zone: UTC+01:00 (CET)
  - Summer (DST): UTC+02:00 (CEST)
- Postal codes: 29416
- Dialling codes: 039035
- Vehicle registration: SAW

Valfitz is a village and a former municipality in the district Altmarkkreis Salzwedel, in Saxony-Anhalt, Germany. Since 1 July 2009, it is part of the municipality Kuhfelde. It was founded before or in 1926. Rene Fonger, project manager at the BUND in Saxony-Anhalt, characterized the area as "[becoming] a real hotspot in Saxony-Anhalt for meadow harriers".
