= Hohentramm =

- Ortsteil of Beetzendorf
- Interactive map of Hohentramm
- Location within Germany Location within Saxony-Anhalt
- Coordinates: 52°42′24″N 11°08′36″E
- Country: Germany
- State: Saxony-Anhalt
- District: Altmarkkreis Salzwedel
- Town: Beetzendorf

Area
  - Total: 16.76 km^{2} (6.47 sq mi)
- Elevation: 45 m (148 ft)

Population (2006-12-31)
  - Total: 253
  - Density: 15.1/km^{2} (39.1/sq mi)
- Time zone: UTC+01:00 (CET)
  - Summer (DST): UTC+02:00 (CEST)
- Postal codes: 38489
- Dialling codes: 039000
- Vehicle registration: SAW
- Website: www.beetzendorf-diesdorf.de

Hohentramm is a village and a former municipality in the district of Altmarkkreis Salzwedel, in Saxony-Anhalt, Germany. Since 1 January 2009, it is part of the municipality of Beetzendorf.
