= Frederick Klaeber =

German academic

- Born: Friedrich J. Klaeber; 1 October 1863; Beetzendorf, Kingdom of Prussia
- Died: 4 October 1954 (aged 91); Bad Kösen, German Democratic Republic
- Education: Frederick William University
- Known for: Beowulf scholarship
- Spouse: Charlotte Wahn
- Scientific career
- Fields: Philology
- Workplaces: University of Minnesota, Frederick William University
- Thesis: (1892)

Frederick J. Klaeber (born Friedrich J. Klaeber; 1 October 1863 – 4 October 1954) was a German philologist who was Professor of Old and Middle English at the University of Minnesota. His edition of the poem Beowulf, published as Beowulf and the Fight at Finnsburg, is considered a classic work of Beowulf scholarship; it has been in print continuously since 1922 and is now in its fourth edition.

== Biography ==
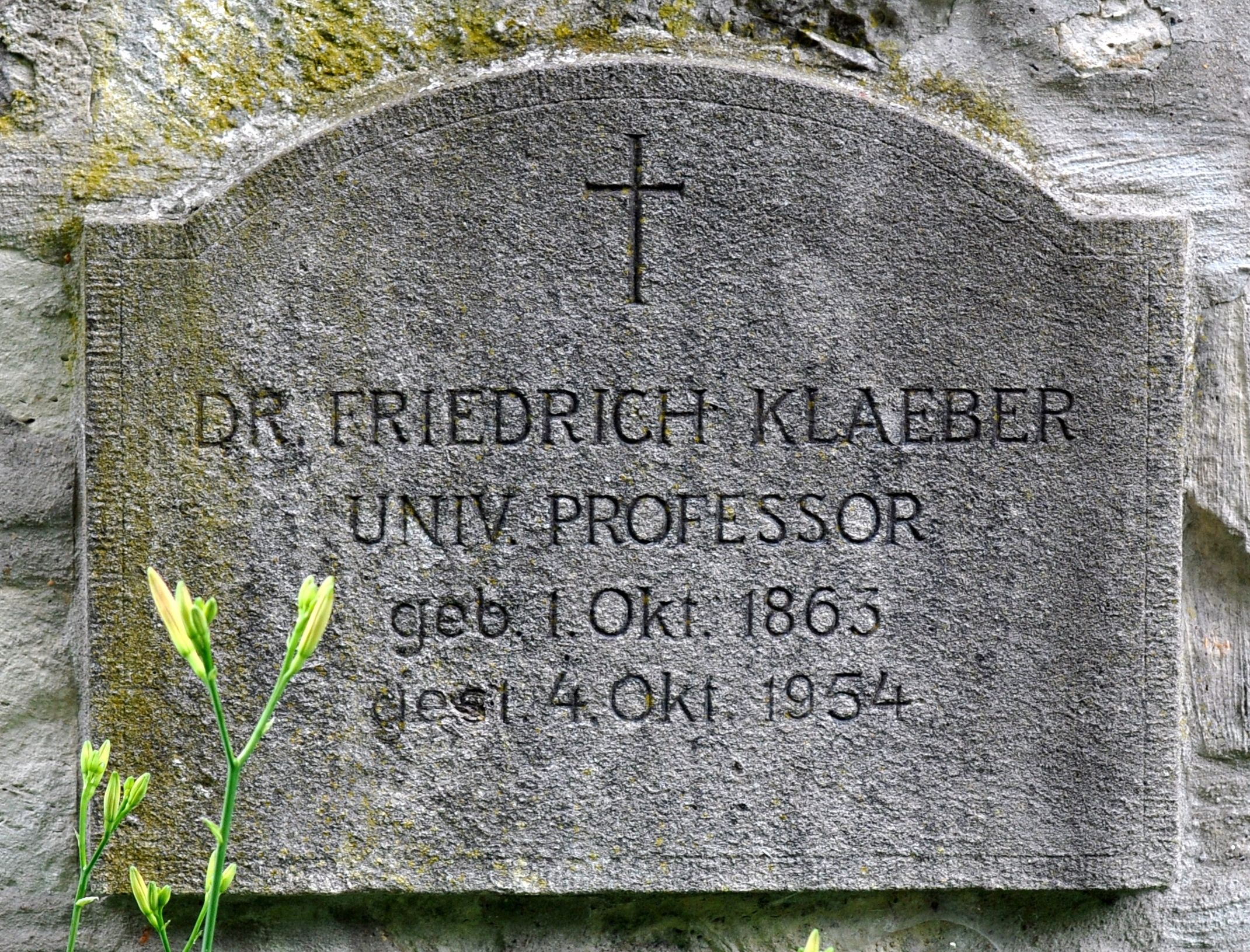
Grave of Klaeber in Bad Kösen (Germany)

Klaeber was born in Beetzendorf, Kingdom of Prussia to Hermann and Luise Klaeber. He received his doctorate from the University of Berlin (Philosophy) in 1892. He was invited to join the University of Minnesota as an Assistant Professor of English Philology. He was Professor of English and Comparative Philology from 1898 to 1931. In 1902 he married Charlotte Wahn.

Klaeber retired from Minnesota in 1931 and returned to Berlin, where he continued to work on what would become the 1936 third edition of Beowulf and the Fight at Finnsburg. During World War II, his house in Berlin was destroyed, including his books, articles, and notes; he and his wife fled to her house in Bad Kösen, where he continued work on what would be published as the second supplement to the third edition of Beowulf and the Fight at Finnsburg (1950). During this time, because he no longer had his library and paper was scarce (Bad Kösen was in the Soviet occupation zone), he depended greatly on colleagues and friends in the US. Toward the end of his life, Klaeber was bedridden, impoverished, and partially paralyzed but continued his scholarly work nevertheless. He died in 1954.

== Beowulf and the Fight at Finnsburg ==
Klaeber was fluent in a number of languages (Greek, Latin, French, Germanic, Old, Middle, and Modern English) and was thus asked by the University of Minnesota to create an English language edition of Beowulf in 1893. Klaeber spent three decades on the project, finally publishing the first edition, Beowulf and the Fight at Finnsburg, in 1922. The Finnesburg Fragment which he included is all that remains of another poem about an event alluded to in Beowulf. The second edition was published in 1928. The third edition was published in 1936; it was republished with a supplement in 1941, and then republished again with a second supplement in 1950. All of Klaeber's editions have included a substantial Introduction, discussing a range of different topics related to the poem, and a comprehensive Commentary section on particular aspects of the text, as well as an extensive glossary.

For many years, Klaeber was considered one of the world's leading Beowulf researchers, and his great work, Beowulf and the Fight at Finnsburg, became enormously important and influential on scholars and students of those poems. As Josephine Bloomfield observes:

Among the editions of Beowulf, Frederick Klaeber's remains the most important. A monumental project begun in 1893, published in 1922, and revised and supplemented up to 1950, it continues to be the central source used by graduate students for the study of the poem and by scholars and teachers as the basis of their translations.

Grendel reaches Heorot: Beowulf 710–714
Old English in Klaeber's 1922 edition	Francis Barton Gummere's translation
Ðá cóm of móre under misthleoþum	Then from the moorland, by misty crags,
Grendel gongan· Godes yrre bær;	with God’s wrath laden, Grendel came.
mynte se mánscaða manna cynnes	The monster was minded of mankind now
sumne besyrwan in sele þám héan·	sundry to seize in the stately house.

In 2008, a new version prepared by an editorial team consisting of Robert Dennis Fulk, Robert E. Bjork, and John D. Niles was published as the "fourth edition"; it retains much of Klaeber's third edition design and text, but also substantial alterations intended to update the work by taking into account scholarship on Beowulf published since 1950.

== Selected publications ==
- 1903: "Notes on Old English Prose Text", in: Modern Language Notes; 18.8; pp. 241–247
- 1912: "Die christlichen Elemente im Beowulf", in: Anglia; 35; pp. 111–136 (in German)
- 1929: Studies in English Philology: a miscellany in honor of Frederick Klaeber. Ed. Kemp Malone and Martin B. Ruud. Minneapolis: University of Minnesota Press (includes: "A bibliography of the works of Frederick Klaeber"; [by] Stefán Einarsson, pp. 477–85)

== See also ==
- Beowulf
- Grendel's mother
