= Bierstedt =

- Ortsteil of Rohrberg
- Interactive map of Bierstedt
- Location within Germany Location within Saxony-Anhalt
- Coordinates: 52°43′36″N 11°01′00″E
- Country: Germany
- State: Saxony-Anhalt
- District: Altmarkkreis Salzwedel
- Town: Rohrberg

Area
  - Total: 11.42 km^{2} (4.41 sq mi)
- Elevation: 43 m (141 ft)

Population (2006-12-31)
  - Total: 164
  - Density: 14.4/km^{2} (37.2/sq mi)
- Time zone: UTC+01:00 (CET)
  - Summer (DST): UTC+02:00 (CEST)
- Postal codes: 29416
- Dialling codes: 039007
- Vehicle registration: SAW
- Website: www.beetzendorf- diesdorf.de

Bierstedt is a village and a former municipality in the district Altmarkkreis Salzwedel, in Saxony-Anhalt, Germany. Since 1 January 2009, it is part of the municipality Rohrberg. It is located in central Germany.
