= Ellenberg, Saxony-Anhalt =

Ellenberg
- Ortsteil of Wallstawe
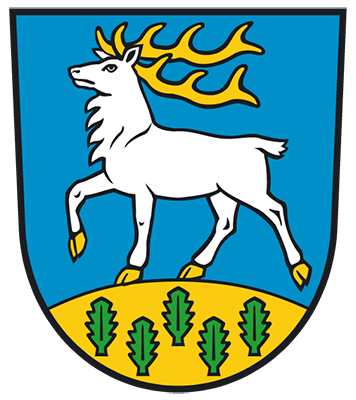
- Coat of arms
- Interactive map of Ellenberg
- Location within Germany Location within Saxony-Anhalt
- Coordinates: 52°48′00″N 10°58′00″E
- Country: Germany
- State: Saxony-Anhalt
- District: Altmarkkreis Salzwedel
- Town: Wallstawe

Area
  - Total: 18.63 km^{2} (7.19 sq mi)
- Elevation: 35 m (115 ft)

Population (2006-12-31)
  - Total: 428
  - Density: 23.0/km^{2} (59.5/sq mi)
- Time zone: UTC+01:00 (CET)
  - Summer (DST): UTC+02:00 (CEST)
- Postal codes: 29413
- Dialling codes: 039033
- Vehicle registration: SAW

Ellenberg (German pronunciation: [ˈɛlənbɛʁk]) is a village and a former municipality in the district Altmarkkreis Salzwedel, in Saxony-Anhalt, Germany. Since 1 July 2009, it has been part of the municipality Wallstawe.
