= Lagendorf =

- Ortsteil of Dähre
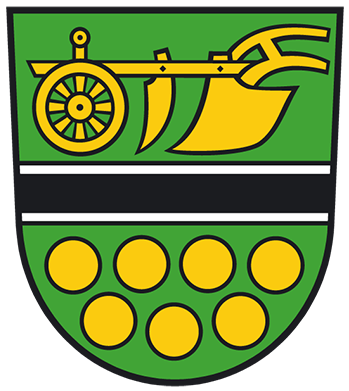
- Coat of arms
- Interactive map of Lagendorf
- Location within Germany Location within Saxony-Anhalt
- Coordinates: 52°50′00″N 10°51′00″E
- Country: Germany
- State: Saxony-Anhalt
- District: Altmarkkreis Salzwedel
- Municipality: Dähre

Area
  - Total: 38.62 km^{2} (14.91 sq mi)
- Elevation: 62 m (203 ft)

Population (2006-12-31)
  - Total: 490
  - Density: 13/km^{2} (33/sq mi)
- Time zone: UTC+01:00 (CET)
  - Summer (DST): UTC+02:00 (CEST)
- Postal codes: 29413
- Dialling codes: 039039
- Vehicle registration: SAW

Lagendorf is a village and a former municipality in the district Altmarkkreis Salzwedel, in Saxony-Anhalt, Germany. Since 1 January 2009, it is part of the municipality Dähre.
