= Nettgau =

- Ortsteil of Jübar
- Interactive map of Nettgau
- Location within Germany Location within Saxony-Anhalt
- Coordinates: 52°38′24″N 10°54′12″E
- Country: Germany
- State: Saxony-Anhalt
- District: Altmarkkreis Salzwedel
- Municipality: Jübar

Area
  - Total: 20.86 km^{2} (8.05 sq mi)
- Elevation: 73 m (240 ft)

Population (2006-12-31)
  - Total: 340
  - Density: 16/km^{2} (42/sq mi)
- Time zone: UTC+01:00 (CET)
  - Summer (DST): UTC+02:00 (CEST)
- Postal codes: 38489
- Dialling codes: 039003
- Vehicle registration: SAW
- Website: www.nettgau.de

Nettgau is a village and a former municipality in the district Altmarkkreis Salzwedel, in Saxony-Anhalt, Germany. Since 1 January 2010, it is part of the municipality Jübar.
