= Beetzendorf =

- Municipality
- Coat of arms

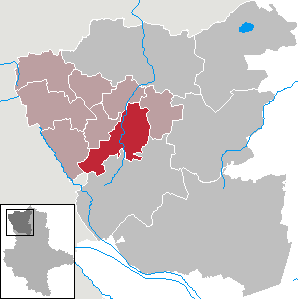
- Location of Beetzendorf within Altmarkkreis Salzwedel district
- Interactive map of Beetzendorf
- Location within Germany Location within Saxony-Anhalt
- Coordinates: 52°42′00″N 11°05′30″E
- Country: Germany
- State: Saxony-Anhalt
- District: Altmarkkreis Salzwedel
- Municipal assoc.: Beetzendorf-Diesdorf

Government
  - Mayor (2022–29): Enrico Lehnemann

Area
  - Total: 97.97 km^{2} (37.83 sq mi)
- Elevation: 35 m (115 ft)

Population (2025-12-31)
  - Total: 2,870
  - Density: 29.3/km^{2} (75.9/sq mi)
- Time zone: UTC+01:00 (CET)
  - Summer (DST): UTC+02:00 (CEST)
- Postal codes: 38489, 38486
- Dialling codes: 039000, 039007
- Vehicle registration: SAW, GA, KLZ
- Website: www.beetzendorf- diesdorf.de

Beetzendorf (German pronunciation: [ˈbeːtsn̩ˌdɔʁf]) is a municipality in the district Altmarkkreis Salzwedel, in Saxony-Anhalt, Germany. It consists of the following Ortsteile or municipal divisions:

- Audorf
- Bandau
- Beetzendorf
- Darnebeck
- Groß Gischau
- Hohentramm
- Jeeben
- Käcklitz
- Klein Gischau
- Mellin
- Neumühle
- Peertz
- Poppau
- Siedengrieben
- Stapen
- Tangeln
- Wohlgemuth

Since 1 January 2009 it has incorporated the former municipalities of Bandau, Hohentramm, Jeeben, Mellin and Tangeln.

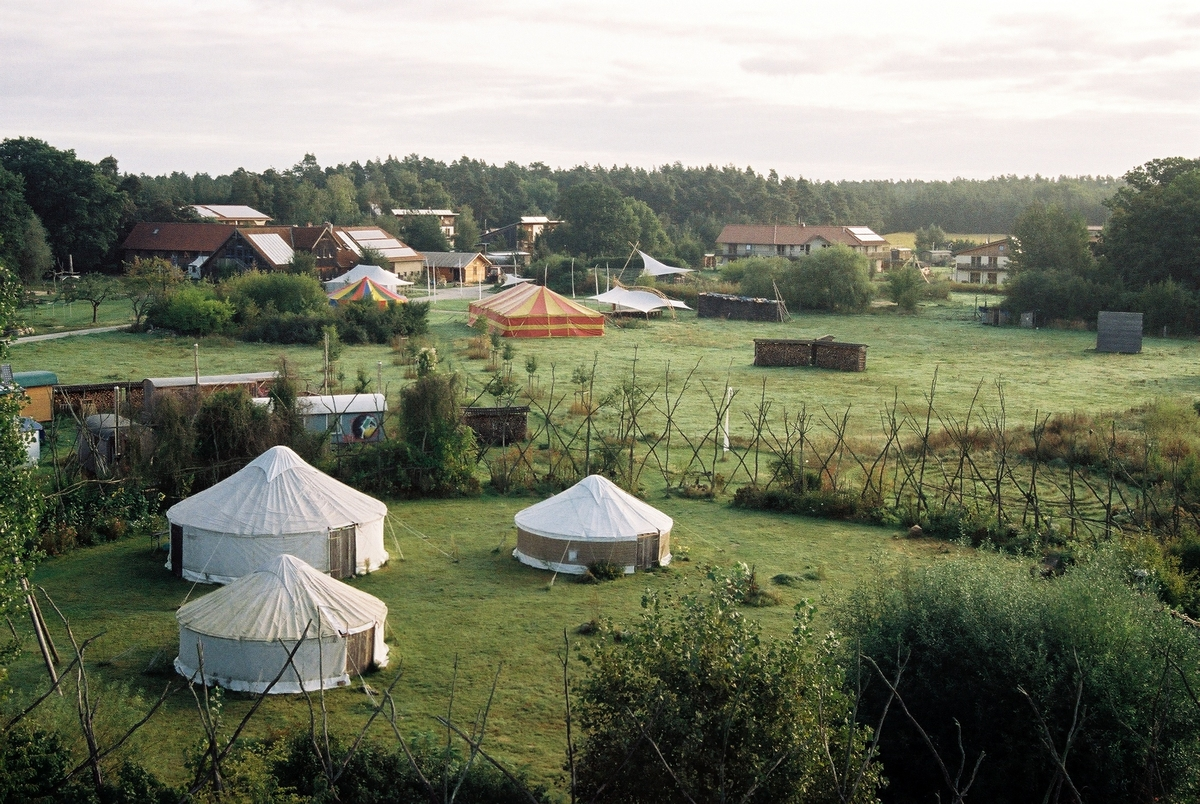
Sieben Linden in year 2012

Among other more older villages like Mellin, an ecological project had been constructed since 1997 near Poppau, the Ecovillage Sieben Linden.

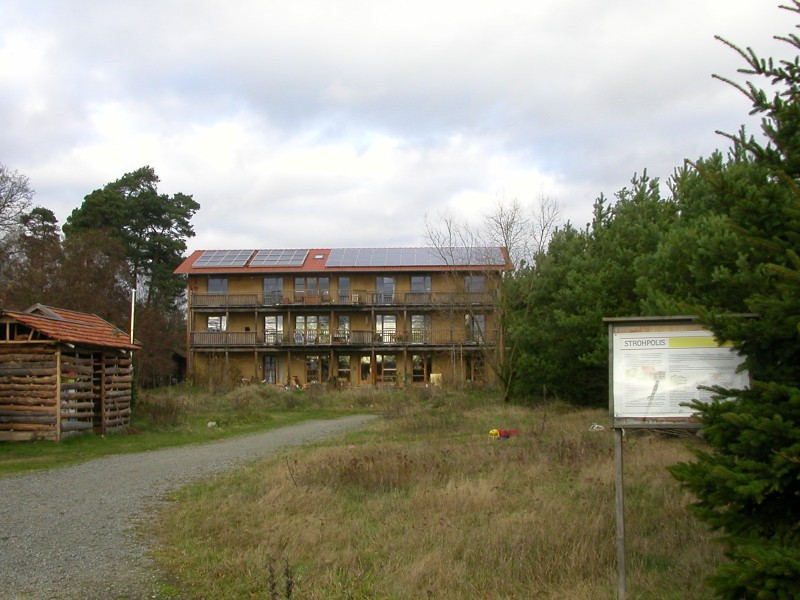
A straw bale house with Solar panels

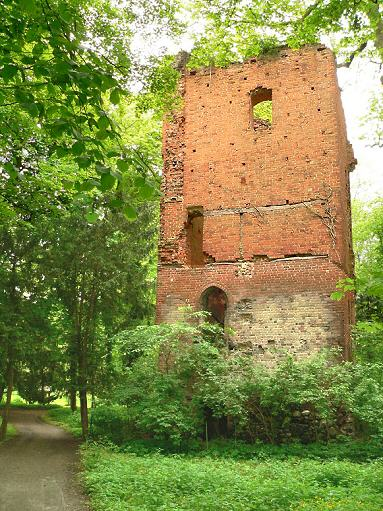
history: ruins of old castle (built in year 1200)

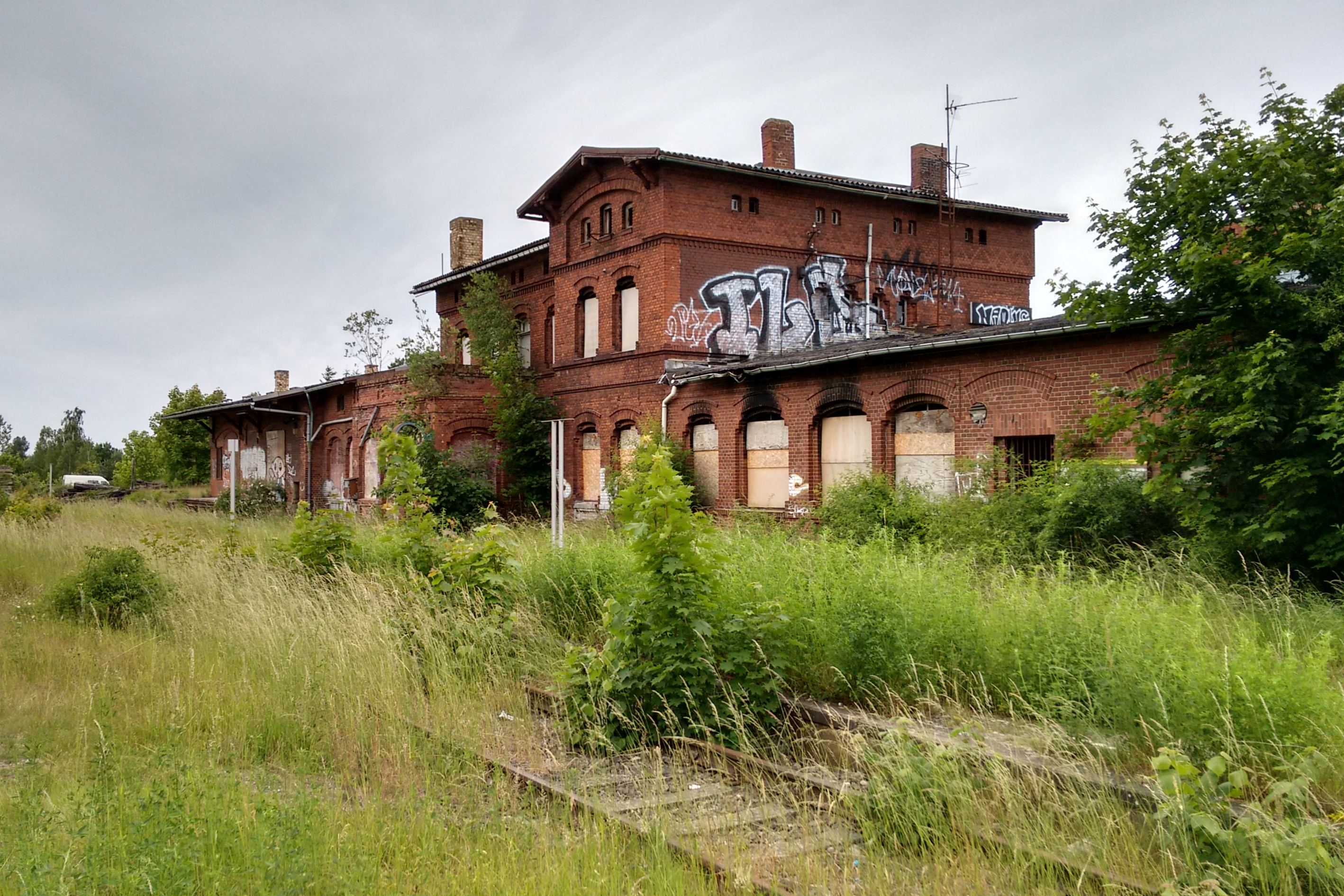
Former railway station

== Notable people ==
- Frederick Klaeber, philologist
