= Dähre =

- Municipality
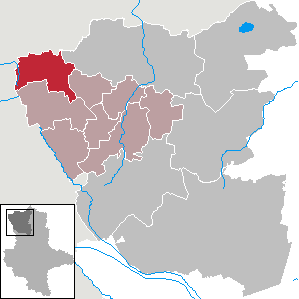
- Location of Dähre within Altmarkkreis Salzwedel district
- Interactive map of Dähre
- Location within Germany Location within Saxony-Anhalt
- Coordinates: 52°48′2″N 10°54′32″E
- Country: Germany
- State: Saxony-Anhalt
- District: Altmarkkreis Salzwedel
- Municipal assoc.: Beetzendorf-Diesdorf

Government
  - Mayor (2023–30): Bernd Hane (CDU)

Area
  - Total: 78.73 km^{2} (30.40 sq mi)
- Elevation: 53 m (174 ft)

Population (2025-12-31)
  - Total: 1,302
  - Density: 16.54/km^{2} (42.83/sq mi)
- Time zone: UTC+01:00 (CET)
  - Summer (DST): UTC+02:00 (CEST)
- Postal codes: 29413
- Dialling codes: 039031
- Vehicle registration: SAW
- Website: www.beetzendorf-diesdorf.de

Dähre (German pronunciation: [ˈdɛːʁə]) is a municipality in the district Altmarkkreis Salzwedel, in Saxony-Anhalt, Germany. A section of the Salzwedeler Dumme river flows through it. Since 2009 it has incorporated the former municipalities of Bonese and Lagendorf.
