= Mellin, Saxony-Anhalt =

Village in Saxony-Anhalt, Germany

- Ortsteil of Beetzendorf
- Interactive map of Mellin, Saxony-Anhalt
- Location within Germany Location within Saxony-Anhalt
- Coordinates: 52°39′00″N 10°59′00″E
- Country: Germany
- State: Saxony-Anhalt
- District: Altmarkkreis Salzwedel
- Town: Beetzendorf

Area
  - Total: 8.89 km^{2} (3.43 sq mi)
- Elevation: 45 m (148 ft)

Population (2006-12-31)
  - Total: 202
  - Density: 22.7/km^{2} (58.9/sq mi)
- Time zone: UTC+01:00 (CET)
  - Summer (DST): UTC+02:00 (CEST)
- Postal codes: 38489
- Dialling codes: 039007
- Vehicle registration: SAW

Mellin is a village and a former municipality in the district Altmarkkreis Salzwedel, in Saxony-Anhalt, Germany. Since 1 January 2009, it is part of the municipality Beetzendorf.
