= Jeeben =

- Ortsteil of Beetzendorf
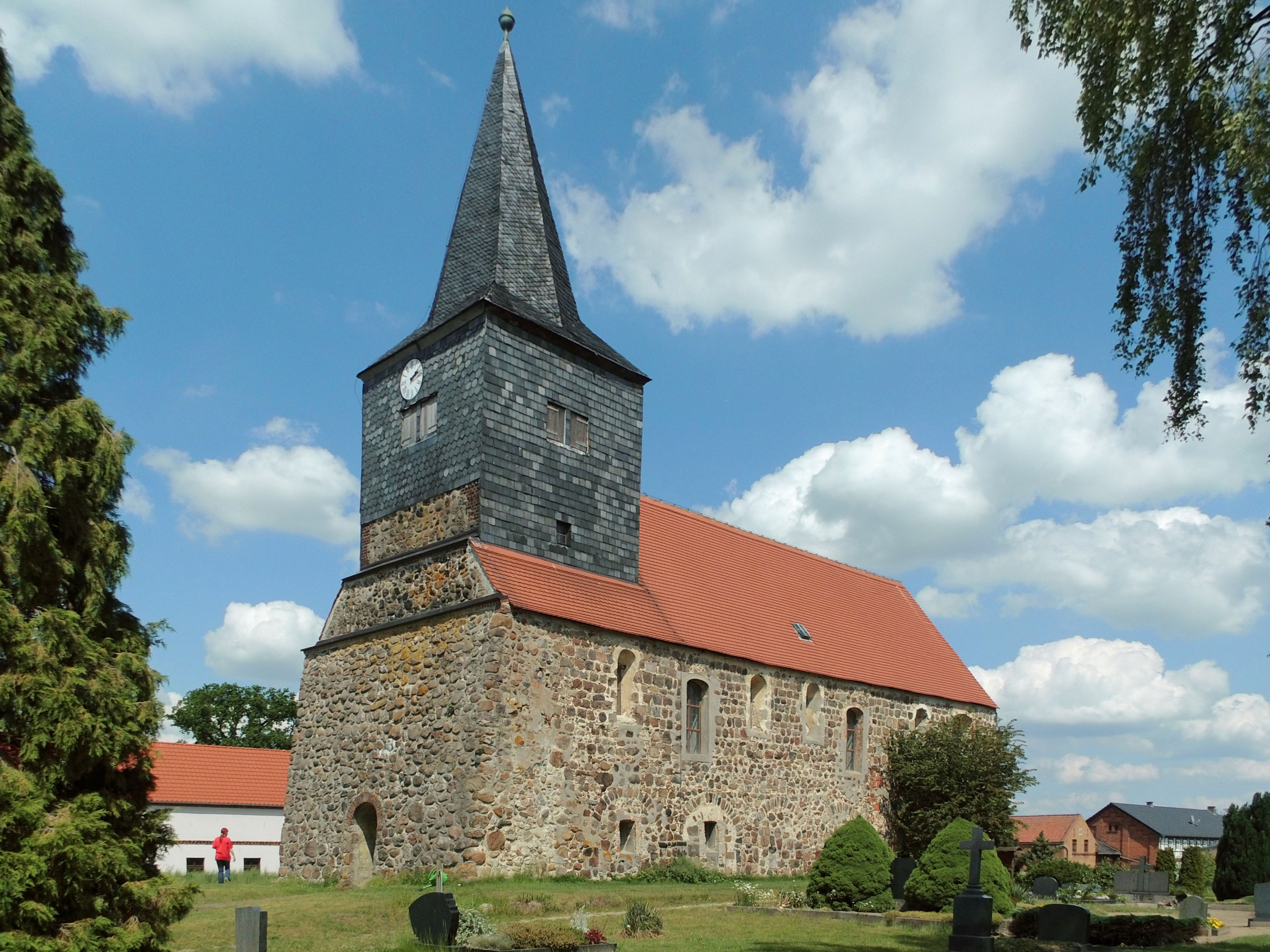
- Interactive map of Jeeben
- Location within Germany Location within Saxony-Anhalt
- Coordinates: 52°41′00″N 11°05′24″E
- Country: Germany
- State: Saxony-Anhalt
- District: Altmarkkreis Salzwedel
- Town: Beetzendorf

Area
  - Total: 11.88 km^{2} (4.59 sq mi)
- Elevation: 40 m (130 ft)

Population (2006-12-31)
  - Total: 268
  - Density: 22.6/km^{2} (58.4/sq mi)
- Time zone: UTC+01:00 (CET)
  - Summer (DST): UTC+02:00 (CEST)
- Postal codes: 38489
- Dialling codes: 039000
- Vehicle registration: SAW
- Website: www.beetzendorf-diesdorf.de

Jeeben is a village and a former municipality in the district Altmarkkreis Salzwedel, in Saxony-Anhalt, Germany. Since 1 January 2009, it has been part of the municipality Beetzendorf.
