= Rohrberg, Saxony-Anhalt =

Rohrberg
- Municipality
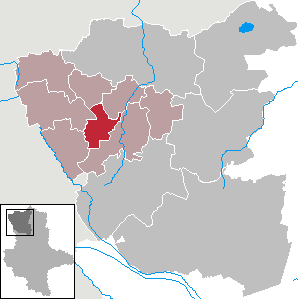
- Location of Rohrberg within Altmarkkreis Salzwedel district
- Interactive map of Rohrberg
- Location within Germany Location within Saxony-Anhalt
- Coordinates: 52°42′24″N 11°02′12″E
- Country: Germany
- State: Saxony-Anhalt
- District: Altmarkkreis Salzwedel
- Municipal assoc.: Beetzendorf-Diesdorf

Government
  - Mayor (2022–29): Silke Niebur

Area
  - Total: 38.29 km^{2} (14.78 sq mi)
- Elevation: 37 m (121 ft)

Population (2025-12-31)
  - Total: 958
  - Density: 25.0/km^{2} (64.8/sq mi)
- Time zone: UTC+01:00 (CET)
  - Summer (DST): UTC+02:00 (CEST)
- Postal codes: 38489
- Dialling codes: 039000
- Vehicle registration: SAW
- Website: www.beetzendorf-diesdorf.de

Rohrberg is a municipality in the district Altmarkkreis Salzwedel, in Saxony-Anhalt, Germany. Since January 2009, it includes the former municipalities of Ahlum and Bierstedt.
