= Kuhfelde =

- Municipality
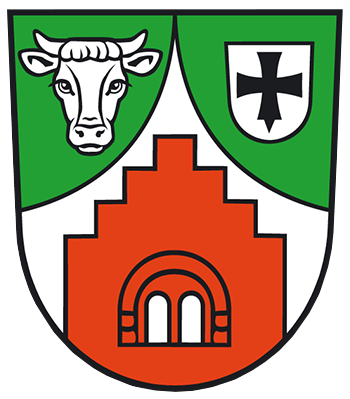
- Coat of arms

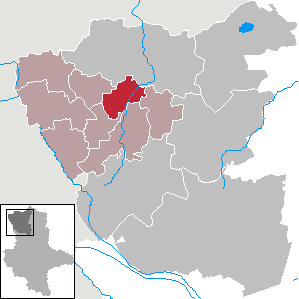
- Location of Kuhfelde within Altmarkkreis Salzwedel district
- Interactive map of Kuhfelde
- Location within Germany Location within Saxony-Anhalt
- Coordinates: 52°47′00″N 11°07′00″E
- Country: Germany
- State: Saxony-Anhalt
- District: Altmarkkreis Salzwedel
- Municipal assoc.: Beetzendorf-Diesdorf

Government
  - Mayor (2018–25): Günther Serien

Area
  - Total: 45.6 km^{2} (17.6 sq mi)
- Elevation: 22 m (72 ft)

Population (2025-12-31)
  - Total: 1,002
  - Density: 22.0/km^{2} (56.9/sq mi)
- Time zone: UTC+01:00 (CET)
  - Summer (DST): UTC+02:00 (CEST)
- Postal codes: 29416
- Dialling codes: 039035
- Vehicle registration: SAW
- Website: www.beetzendorf-diesdorf.de

Kuhfelde is a municipality in the district Altmarkkreis Salzwedel, in Saxony-Anhalt, Germany. Since 2009 it has included the former municipalities of Püggen, Siedenlangenbeck and Valfitz.
