= Beetzendorf-Diesdorf =

- Verbandsgemeinde
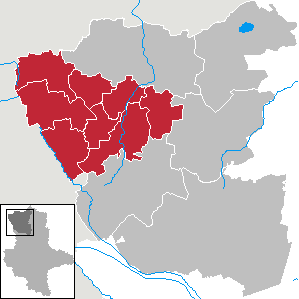
- Map of Altmarkkreis Salzwedel highlighting Beetzendorf-Diesdorf
- Interactive map of Beetzendorf-Diesdorf
- Location within Germany Location within Saxony-Anhalt
- Coordinates: 52°44′N 10°56′E
- Country: Germany
- State: Saxony-Anhalt
- District: Altmarkkreis Salzwedel
- Seat: Beetzendorf
- Subdivisions: 8 municipalities

Area
  - Total: 535.45 km^{2} (206.74 sq mi)

Population (2025-12-31)
  - Total: 12,156
  - Density: 22.702/km^{2} (58.799/sq mi)
- Time zone: UTC+01:00 (CET)
  - Summer (DST): UTC+02:00 (CEST)
- Website: www.beetzendorf-diesdorf.de

Beetzendorf-Diesdorf is a Verbandsgemeinde ("collective municipality") in the Altmarkkreis Salzwedel (district), in Saxony-Anhalt, Germany. Until 1 January 2010, it was a Verwaltungsgemeinschaft. It is situated southwest of Salzwedel. The seat of the Verbandsgemeinde is in Beetzendorf.

The Verbandsgemeinde Beetzendorf-Diesdorf consists of the following municipalities:

1. Apenburg-Winterfeld
2. Beetzendorf
3. Dähre
4. Diesdorf
5. Jübar
6. Kuhfelde
7. Rohrberg
8. Wallstawe
