= Hanum =

- Ortsteil of Jübar
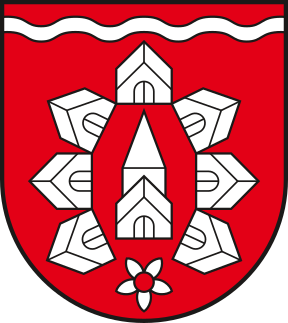
- Coat of arms
- Interactive map of Hanum
- Location within Germany Location within Saxony-Anhalt
- Coordinates: 52°41′10″N 10°51′24″E
- Country: Germany
- State: Saxony-Anhalt
- District: Altmarkkreis Salzwedel
- Municipality: Jübar

Area
  - Total: 9.72 km^{2} (3.75 sq mi)
- Elevation: 77 m (253 ft)

Population (2006-12-31)
  - Total: 188
  - Density: 19.3/km^{2} (50.1/sq mi)
- Time zone: UTC+01:00 (CET)
  - Summer (DST): UTC+02:00 (CEST)
- Postal codes: 38489
- Dialling codes: 039003
- Vehicle registration: SAW
- Website: Gemeinde Hanum

Hanum is a village and a former municipality in the district Altmarkkreis Salzwedel, in Saxony-Anhalt, Germany. Since 1 January 2010, it has been a part of the municipality Jübar.
