= Wallstawe =

- Municipality
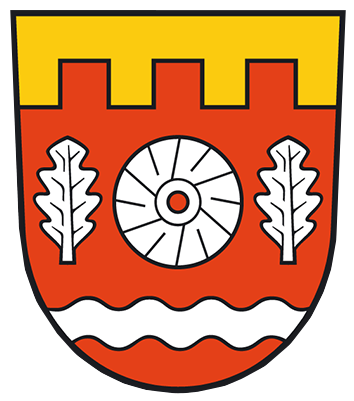
- Coat of arms

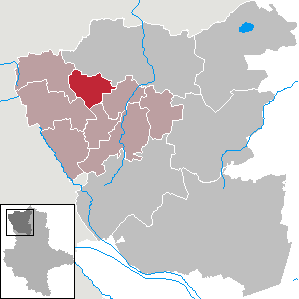
- Location of Wallstawe within Altmarkkreis Salzwedel district
- Interactive map of Wallstawe
- Location within Germany Location within Saxony-Anhalt
- Coordinates: 52°47′48″N 11°01′12″E
- Country: Germany
- State: Saxony-Anhalt
- District: Altmarkkreis Salzwedel
- Municipal assoc.: Beetzendorf-Diesdorf

Government
  - Mayor (2020–27): Ralph Jürges

Area
  - Total: 44.09 km^{2} (17.02 sq mi)
- Elevation: 32 m (105 ft)

Population (2025-12-31)
  - Total: 812
  - Density: 18.4/km^{2} (47.7/sq mi)
- Time zone: UTC+01:00 (CET)
  - Summer (DST): UTC+02:00 (CEST)
- Postal codes: 29413
- Dialling codes: 039033
- Vehicle registration: SAW
- Website: www.beetzendorf-diesdorf.de

Wallstawe is a municipality in the district Altmarkkreis Salzwedel, in Saxony-Anhalt, Germany. Since July 2009 it has included the former municipalities of Ellenberg and Gieseritz.
