= Gieseritz =

- Ortsteil of Wallstawe
- Interactive map of Gieseritz
- Location within Germany Location within Saxony-Anhalt
- Coordinates: 52°46′36″N 11°00′48″E
- Country: Germany
- State: Saxony-Anhalt
- District: Altmarkkreis Salzwedel
- Town: Wallstawe

Area
  - Total: 13.45 km^{2} (5.19 sq mi)
- Elevation: 36 m (118 ft)

Population (2006-12-31)
  - Total: 158
  - Density: 11.7/km^{2} (30.4/sq mi)
- Time zone: UTC+01:00 (CET)
  - Summer (DST): UTC+02:00 (CEST)
- Postal codes: 29413
- Dialling codes: 039033
- Vehicle registration: SAW

Gieseritz is a village and a former municipality in the district Altmarkkreis Salzwedel, in Saxony-Anhalt, Germany. Since 1 July 2009, it is part of the municipality Wallstawe.
