= Bandau =

- Ortsteil of Beetzendorf
- Interactive map of Bandau
- Location within Germany Location within Saxony-Anhalt
- Coordinates: 52°40′12″N 11°06′36″E
- Country: Germany
- State: Saxony-Anhalt
- District: Altmarkkreis Salzwedel
- Town: Beetzendorf

Area
  - Total: 15.17 km^{2} (5.86 sq mi)
- Elevation: 45 m (148 ft)

Population (2006-12-31)
  - Total: 511
  - Density: 33.7/km^{2} (87.2/sq mi)
- Time zone: UTC+01:00 (CET)
  - Summer (DST): UTC+02:00 (CEST)
- Postal codes: 38486
- Dialling codes: 039000
- Vehicle registration: SAW
- Website: Gemeinde Bandau

Bandau is a village and a former municipality in the district Altmarkkreis Salzwedel, in Saxony-Anhalt, Germany. Since 1 January 2009, it is part of the municipality Beetzendorf.
