= Püggen =

- Ortsteil of Kuhfelde
- Interactive map of Püggen
- Location within Germany Location within Saxony-Anhalt
- Coordinates: 52°43′56″N 11°3′30″E
- Country: Germany
- State: Saxony-Anhalt
- District: Altmarkkreis Salzwedel
- Town: Kuhfelde

Area
  - Total: 6.27 km^{2} (2.42 sq mi)
- Elevation: 37 m (121 ft)

Population (2006-12-31)
  - Total: 47
  - Density: 7.5/km^{2} (19/sq mi)
- Time zone: UTC+01:00 (CET)
  - Summer (DST): UTC+02:00 (CEST)
- Postal codes: 29416
- Dialling codes: 039035
- Vehicle registration: SAW

Püggen is a village and a former municipality in the district Altmarkkreis Salzwedel, in Saxony-Anhalt, Germany. Since 1 July 2009, it is part of the municipality Kuhfelde.
