= Ahlum =

- Ortsteil of Rohrberg
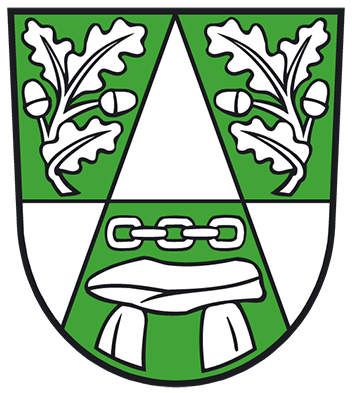
- Coat of arms
- Interactive map of Ahlum
- Location within Germany Location within Saxony-Anhalt
- Coordinates: 52°41′N 11°0′E
- Country: Germany
- State: Saxony-Anhalt
- District: Altmarkkreis Salzwedel
- Town: Rohrberg

Area
  - Total: 16.38 km^{2} (6.32 sq mi)
- Elevation: 40 m (130 ft)

Population (2006-12-31)
  - Total: 494
  - Density: 30.2/km^{2} (78.1/sq mi)
- Time zone: UTC+01:00 (CET)
  - Summer (DST): UTC+02:00 (CEST)
- Postal codes: 38489
- Dialling codes: 039000
- Vehicle registration: SAW
- Website: www.beetzendorf-diesdorf.de

Ahlum is a village and a former municipality in the district Altmarkkreis Salzwedel, in Saxony-Anhalt, Germany. Since 1 January 2009, it is part of the municipality Rohrberg.
