= Bornsen =

- Ortsteil of Jübar
- Interactive map of Bornsen
- Location within Germany Location within Saxony-Anhalt
- Coordinates: 52°43′00″N 10°55′00″E
- Country: Germany
- State: Saxony-Anhalt
- District: Altmarkkreis Salzwedel
- Municipality: Jübar

Area
  - Total: 8.07 km^{2} (3.12 sq mi)
- Elevation: 70 m (230 ft)

Population (2006-12-31)
  - Total: 350
  - Density: 43/km^{2} (110/sq mi)
- Time zone: UTC+01:00 (CET)
  - Summer (DST): UTC+02:00 (CEST)
- Postal codes: 29413
- Dialling codes: 039003
- Vehicle registration: SAW

Bornsen is a village and a former municipality in the district Altmarkkreis Salzwedel, in Saxony-Anhalt, Germany. Since 1 January 2010, it is part of the municipality Jübar.
