= Hohe Börde (Verwaltungsgemeinschaft) =

Coordinates: 52°10′N 11°29′E

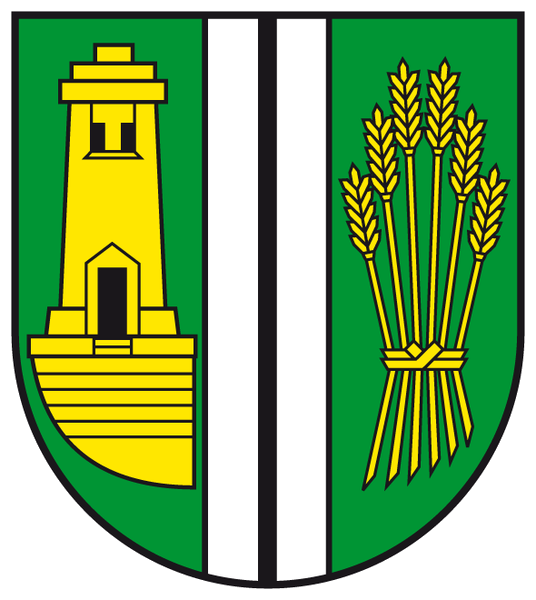
Coat of arms VG Hohe Börde

Hohe Börde was a Verwaltungsgemeinschaft ("collective municipality") in the Börde district, in Saxony-Anhalt, Germany. It was situated west of Magdeburg. The seat of the Verwaltungsgemeinschaft was in Irxleben. It was disbanded on 1 January 2010.

The Verwaltungsgemeinschaft Hohe Börde consisted of the following municipalities (population in 2006 between brackets):

1. Ackendorf (418)
2. Bebertal (1.653)
3. Bornstedt (459)
4. Eichenbarleben (1.169)
5. Groß Santersleben (1.050)
6. Hermsdorf (1.601)
7. Hohenwarsleben (1.577)
8. Irxleben (2.370)
9. Niederndodeleben (4.204)
10. Nordgermersleben (921)
11. Ochtmersleben (571)
12. Rottmersleben (749)
13. Schackensleben (715)
14. Wellen (1.267)
