= Magdeburg Börde =

Central landscape unit of the state of Saxony-Anhalt, Germany

Coordinates: 52°10′20″N 11°26′20″E

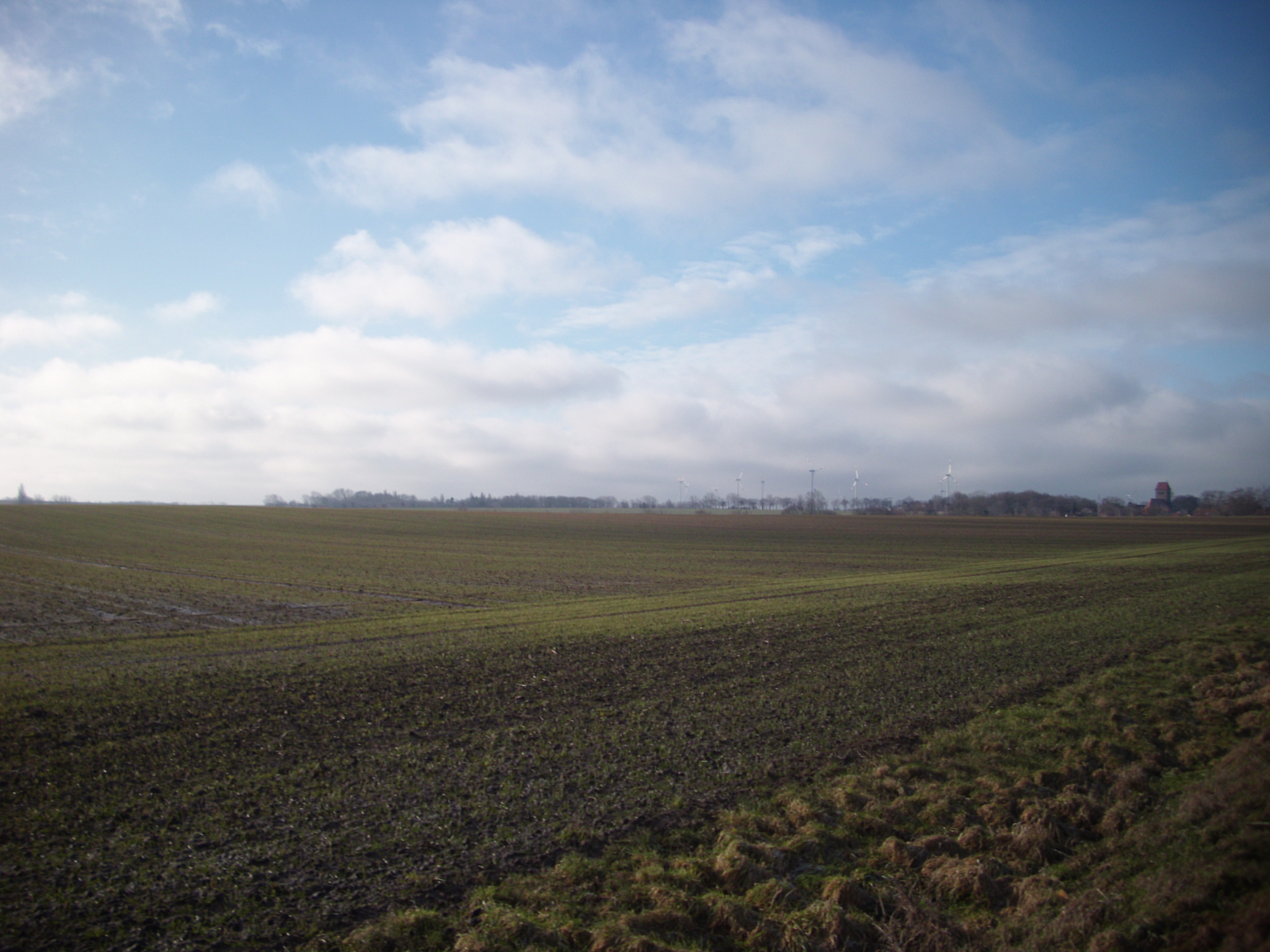
- Farmland near Gutenswegen, Niedere Börde Farmland near Gutenswegen, Niedere Börde
- Native name: Magdeburger Börde
- Area: ca. 949 km²
- Classification: Handbook of Natural Region Divisions of Germany
- Level 2 Region: 533, 52, 51, 50, 46, 45, 44 (less 441) → Lößbörden
- Major unit group: 50 → Middle German Black Earth Region
- Level 4 Region (major unit): 504 → Magdeburg Börde
- County/District: Börde, Salzlandkreis, Magdeburg
- State(s): Saxony-Anhalt

The Magdeburg Börde (German: Magdeburger Börde) is the central landscape unit of the state of Saxony-Anhalt and lies to the west and south of the eponymous state capital Magdeburg. Part of a loess belt stretching along the southeastern rim of the North German Plain, it is noted for its very fertile Chernozem soils.

== Boundaries ==
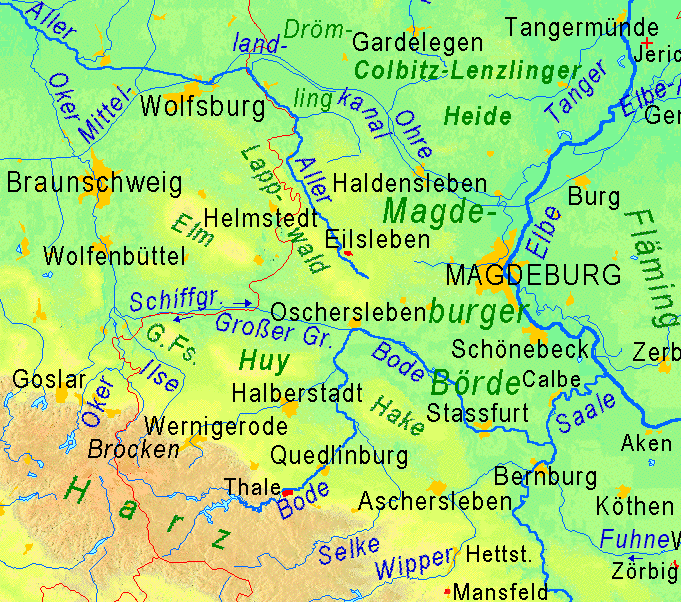
Topography and location of the Magdeburg Börde

The boundaries of the Magdeburg Börde are quite ill-defined. In the west, it borders on the East Brunswick hill country stretching from the Hildesheim Börde in Lower Saxony up to the Hohes Holz forest and the town of Oschersleben on the confluence of the Bode river and the Großer Graben canal. According to the recent editions of the Handbook of the Natural Region Divisions of Germany, the western border north of Oschersleben roughly coincides with the Weser-Elbe watershed along the Druxberge hills.

To the northwest, the basin of the Beber river marks the border with the Drömling nature park near Oebisfelde. To the north, the Börde borders on the Altmark (Letzlingen Heath), being also a part of Saxony-Anhalt; the boundary here is generally reckoned to be coincident with the river Ohre and the Mittelland Canal. In any case, the Flechtingen Hills south of the Ohre only partly belong to the Magdeburg Börde.

Its eastern boundary is mainly defined by the Elbe with the Middle Elbe Biosphere Reserve and the lower Saale river, though several villages east of Magdeburg also consider themselves as part of the Börde. Its transition to Mansfeld Land to the southeast is also gradual. While in the south, the lower Bode river downstream of Oschersleben forms the border, the adjacent northern foothills of the Harz mountains, east of the Selke river, are occasionally also considered part of the Magdeburg Börde.

== General ==
The landscape is gently undulating and largely treeless. The underlying terrain mainly comprises loose morainic material from the Saale glaciation period with individual outcrops of older rock. This older bedrock and loose morainic debris is mostly obscured by a covering of wind-blown loess. The area has very fertile soils (partly of black earth), on which sugar beet and wheat are the main crops. In 1934 the soil in the old municipality of Eickendorf (today Bördeland) was given a soil value of 100, which made it the richest soil in Germany, and it was used until the division of Germany in 1945 as a yardstick for the quality of German soils.

The Magdeburg Börde lies in the rain shadow of the Harz Mountains and is consequently one of the driest regions of Germany, albeit not the warmest or sunniest. The highest elevation on the Magdeburg Börde is the Großer Wartberg near Niederndodeleben with a height of 145.7 m.

Major settlements include Wanzleben, Irxleben, and Egeln, as well as Staßfurt and Aschersleben in the northeastern Harz foothills. In the Magdeburg Börde traditionally a variant of the West Low German (Low Saxon) dialect, Bördeplatt, is spoken, though the number of speakers is declining.

== Transport links ==
- Waterways and crossings
  - River Elbe
  - Mittelland Canal
  - Magdeburg Water Bridge (largest in the world)
- Motorways (Autobahns) and federal roads
  - A 2
  - A 14
  - B 1
  - B 71
  - B 79
  - B 81
  - B 245
  - B 246a
- Railways
  - Hanover-Magdeburg-Berlin
  - Wittenberge-Magdeburg-Halle (Saale)
  - Hannover-Wernigerode-Halle (Saale)
  - Magdeburg-Oschersleben (Bode)-Halberstadt
  - Schönebeck-Staßfurt-Aschersleben
- Airports
  - Cochstedt
  - Magdeburg

== See also ==
- Magdeburg Region
