= Eickendorf, Salzlandkreis =

Coordinates: 51.950°N 11.667°E

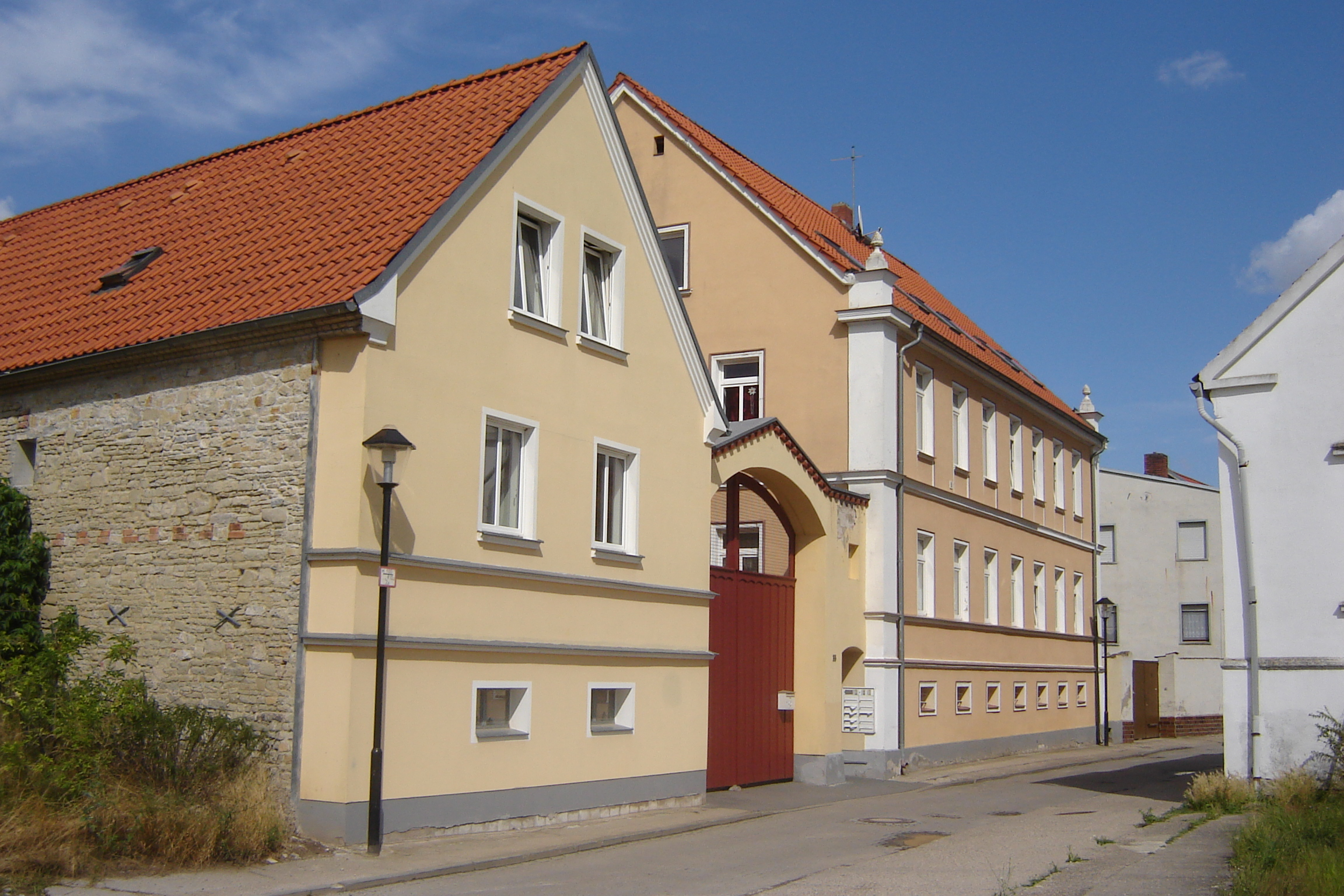
Typical Börde farmstead in Eickendorf

Eickendorf (German pronunciation: [ˈaɪkn̩ˌdɔʁf]) is a former municipality in the district of Salzlandkreis, in Saxony-Anhalt, Germany. Since January 2008, it is part of the municipality Bördeland.

The village is located in the Magdeburg Börde region, known for its fertile Loess (Chernozem) soils. As a yardstick for soil quality, a "Reich Standard Farm" was set up in Eickendorf according to the 1934 Soil Assessment Act, whereby a soil value of 100 was established. It then became the basis of comparison for the tax rating of farms in Germany.

The settlement of Hekenthorp in the Eastphalian lands of Saxony was first mentioned in an 1176 deed. Ruled by several comital dynasties, after the Protestant Reformation and the Thirty Years' War the estates became part of the secularised Duchy of Magdeburg, held by the Hohenzollern rulers of Brandenburg-Prussia. Eickendorf was the ancestral seat of the Eichendorff noble family, whose most prominent member is the poet Joseph Freiherr von Eichendorff (1788–1857).

== See also ==
- Biere
- Eggersdorf
- Großmühlingen
- Kleinmühlingen
- Welsleben
- Zens
