= Altsiedelland =

The Altsiedelland ("old settlement land") is a German term that refers to populated areas in those parts of Central Europe that were settled relatively early, historically speaking.

The Altsiedelland was the result of early historic land acquisition in Central Europe in about the 5th to 8th centuries. The preferred settlement areas were those that were easy to develop for agriculture: the börde, loess and basin regions in what is now central and southern Germany, the Gäu landscapes in the southwest and the dry geest ridges in the northwest, that were also referred to as Gunsträume or "favourable areas". Initially they were settled by individual or double farmsteads, or small hamlets (such as the so-called Drubbel).

From the Carolingian period onwards, the growing population also began to develop less favourable terrain by extending the farmland of existing settlements or clearing the forest in previously uninhabited areas and laying out new villages. These new areas are, logically, referred to as the Jungsiedelland ("new settlement land").

== See also ==
- Altsiedel landscape

== Literature ==
- Walter Schlesinger: Die deutsche Ostsiedlung des Mittelalters als Problem der europäischen Geschichte, Reichenau-Vorträge 1970–1972, Sigmaringen, 1975.
