= Soil Use Efficiency =

Soil Use Efficiency (SUE) is the use of individual and inter-related factors (inherent and dynamic) related to soil quality, soil nutrient availability and nutrient uptake potential as effective reference points for improvement of crop productivity in individual and varying soil types. Assessing SUE involves a site evaluation of the land and pit excavation to examine the soil profile. Site characterization identifies impairments to biomass productivity and the provisioning of ecological services. Inherent impairments are from limits inherent to the land and soil such as steep slope, and subsoil claypan. Dynamic impairments are the result of land degradation, such as soil acidification, loss of soil carbon, water erosion, and wind erosion. Understanding these relationships informs land management decisions needed to restore land productivity. The determination of water-use efficiency (WUE) and Nutrient Use Efficiency (NUE) in agricultural production systems is governed primarily by the boundary conditions of Soil Use Efficiency (SUE).

== See also ==
- Ecological efficiency
- Soil value
- Storie index
- Sustainable agriculture
