= T Cloud Public =

Cloud computing service

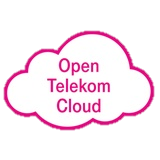
- Developer: Deutsche Telekom AG
- Release: March 14, 2016
- Platform: OpenStack
- Type: Cloud computing, Infrastructure as a Service (IaaS)
- License: Proprietary
- Website: www.t-cloud-public.com

T Cloud Public is a cloud computing service from Deutsche Telekom, formerly known as the Open Telekom Cloud (OTC) before 2026. It runs on the infrastructure as a service (IaaS) model and incorporates OpenStack; the underlying data centers are located in Biere and Magdeburg Germany, and are owned by T-Systems. Since 2021, additional data centers are located in Almere and Aalsmeer, Netherlands, and since 2022 in Bern and Zollikofen, Switzerland.

== Architecture ==
T Cloud Public utilizes OpenStack distribution, enabling users to dynamically manage resources via a self-service portal or API. Customers can individually configure computing, storage, networking, and related resources as needed.

== Services ==
T Cloud Public offers a range of services including computing, storage, networking, database solutions, big data analytics, and AI solutions. Supported operating systems include Ubuntu.

As of 2024, the Biere data center provided storage for approximately 970 petabytes of data on around 100,000 servers, covering a total area of about 11,000 square meters.

Significant collaborative projects include working with CERN, the European Organization for Nuclear Research, to evaluate scientific data processing in commercial cloud environments. Additionally, the Open Telekom Cloud serves as the infrastructure for Mundi Web Services, providing access and processing capabilities for the European Space Agency's (ESA) Copernicus program satellites' data.

== See also ==
- Cloud-computing comparison
- Comparison of file hosting services
