= Eggersdorf =

Former municipality in Saxony-Anhalt, Germany

Coordinates: 51.967°N 11.683°E

Coat of arms

Eggersdorf is a former municipality in the district of Salzlandkreis, in Saxony-Anhalt, Germany. Since January 2008, it is part of the municipality Bördeland.

== See also ==
- Biere
- Eickendorf
- Großmühlingen
- Kleinmühlingen
- Welsleben
- Zens
