= Welsleben =

Municipality in Saxony-Anhalt, Germany

Coordinates: 52°00′N 11°39′E

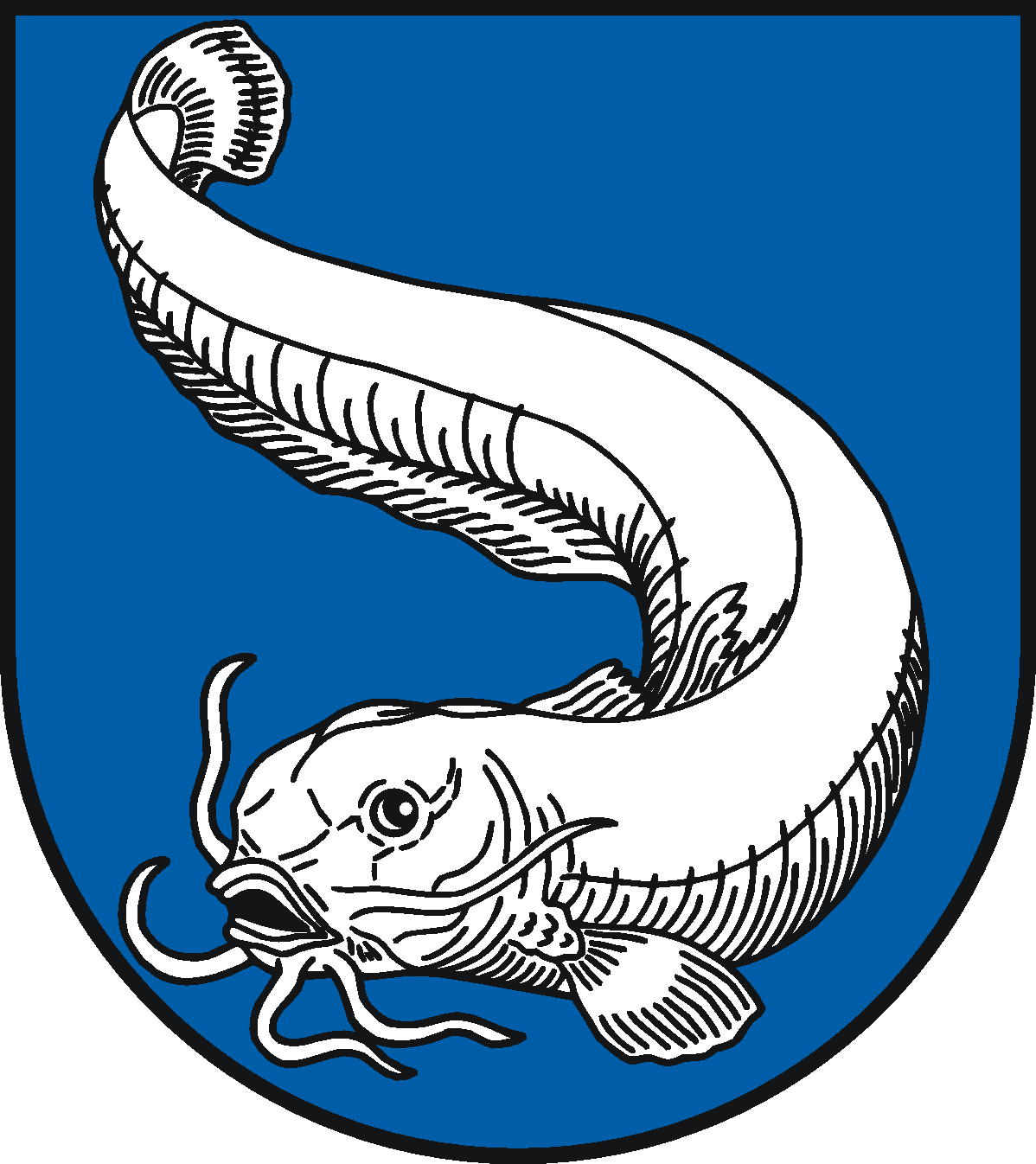
Coat of arms

Welsleben is a former municipality in the district of Salzlandkreis, in Saxony-Anhalt, Germany. Since January 2008, it is part of the municipality Bördeland.

== See also ==
- Biere
- Eggersdorf
- Eickendorf
- Großmühlingen
- Kleinmühlingen
- Zens
