= Gäu =

In the south German language (of the Alemannic-speaking area, or in Switzerland), a gäu (German pronunciation: [ɡɔʏ]) landscape (gäulandschaft) refers to an area of open, level countryside. These regions typically have fertile soils resulting from depositions of loess (an exception is the Arme Gäue ["Poor Gäus"] of the Baden-Württemberg Gäu).

The intensive use of the Gäu regions for crops has displaced the originally wooded countryside (→climax vegetation – in contrast with the steppe heath theory and disputed megaherbivore hypothesis). The North German equivalent of such landscapes is börde.

== See also ==
- Gau (territory) – also gives the etymology and language history of Gäu
- Gäu – regions with the name
- Natural regions referred to as Gäu plateaus:
  - Neckar and Tauber Gäu Plateaus
  - Gäu Plateaus in the Main Triangle
  - Werra Gäu Plateaus
- Gäuboden
- Altsiedelland | Altsiedel landscape
