= Großmühlingen =

Coordinates: 51.950°N 11.700°E

Coat of arms

Großmühlingen is a former municipality in the district of Salzlandkreis, in Saxony-Anhalt, Germany. Since January 2008, it is part of the municipality Bördeland.

== See also ==
- Biere
- Eggersdorf
- Eickendorf
- Kleinmühlingen
- Welsleben
- Zens
