= Hohes Holz =

Forest in Saxony-Anhalt, Germany

Coordinates: 52°05′13″N 11°12′30″E

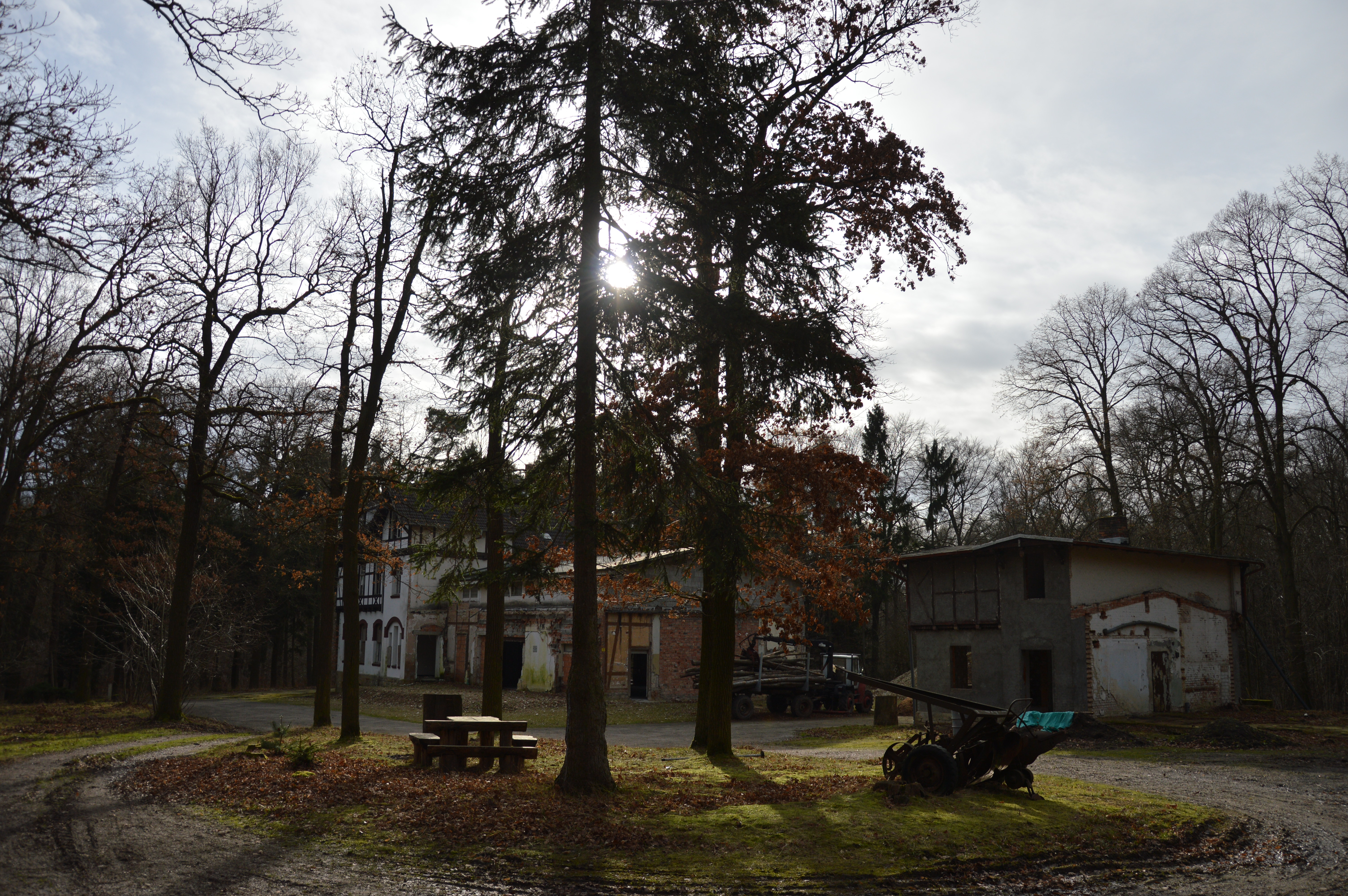
Hubertushöhe Lodge

The Hohes Holz (literally: "High Wood") is an extended forest area on the western rim of the otherwise open, agriculturally intensively-farmed Magdeburg Börde region in the German state of Saxony-Anhalt.

== Geography ==
The hilly region forms the southern part of a ridge that stretches from the Lappwald range in the north along the upper Aller river to the Bode basin near Oschersleben. This ridge is bordered in the northeast by the Upper Aller. Three of the Aller's source streams rise on the northern slopes of the Hohes Holz, which thereby forms part of the Weser-Elbe watershed.

The highest elevation in the Hohes Holz is the Edelberg at 209 m above sea level (NN). The Bode, flowing a few kilometres to the south, is only about 80 m above sea level. Politically the region of the Hohes Holz belongs to the municipalities of Ausleben, Eggenstedt, Stadt Oschersleben (Bode) and Wormsdorf im Börde district.

The Hohes Holz hills, designated as a protected area, extend over about 15 square kilometres (5.8 sq mi). In the middle of this mainly beech covered region there are 150 hectares (370 acres) of nature reserve.

== Flora and fauna ==
Amongst the numerous species of wild flower in the Hohes Holz are the Anemones, liverwort, woodruff, Primula, lily of the valley, Gentian, hyacinths and several orchids (lady orchid, heath spotted orchid and bird's-nest orchid).

The fauna of the region includes the buzzard, red kite, goshawk, sparrowhawk and grey heron as well as fox, weasel, marten, red squirrel and badger.

The Hohes Holz is also a recreation area and "green lung" of great importance for the region about 30 km, located as it is 30 km west of the city of Magdeburg. In addition to a nature trail several signposted cycle ways and footpaths have been established in recent years.
