= Börde =

Fertile plain

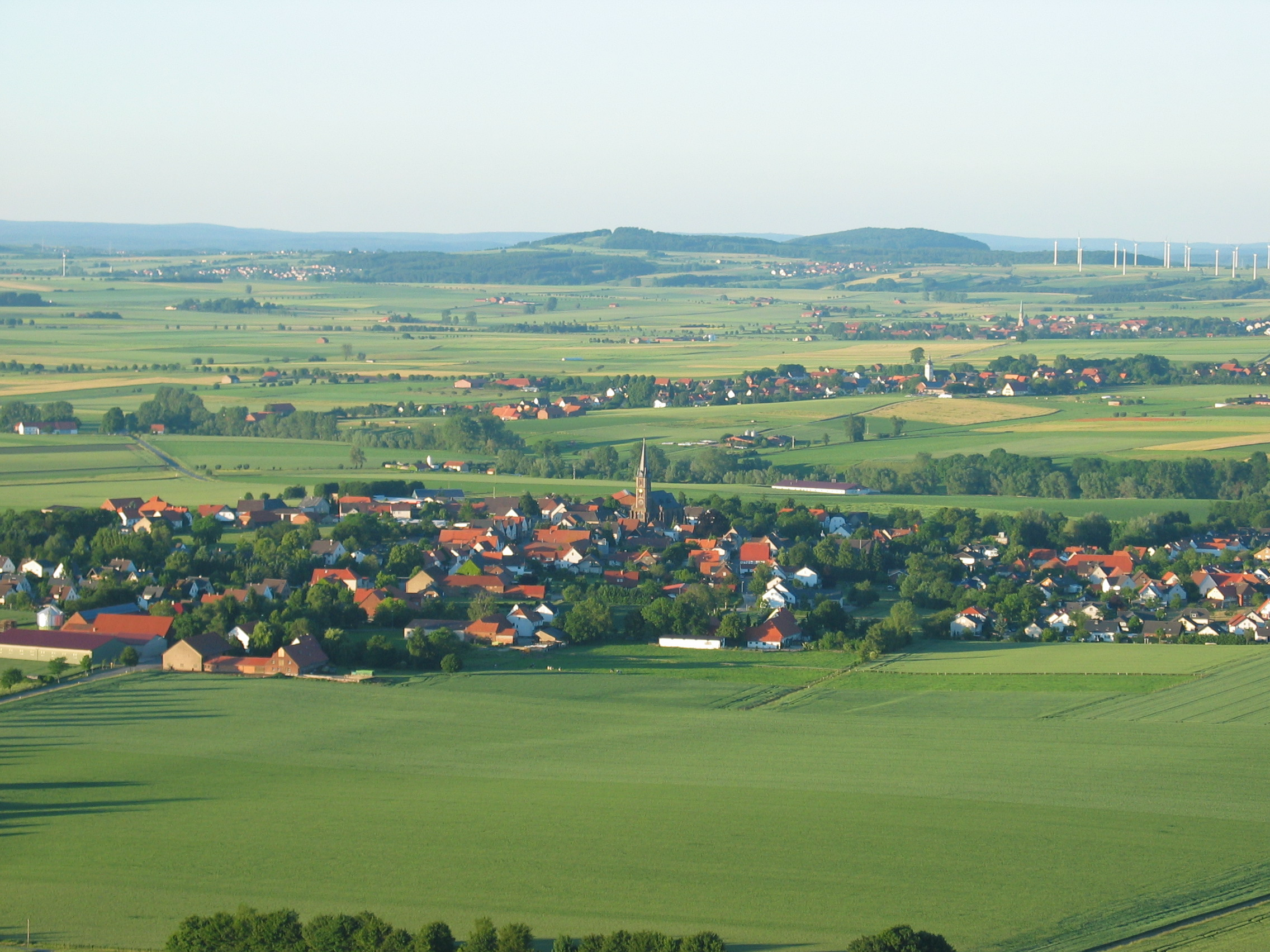
View over the Warburg Börde

A börde (German pronunciation: [ˈbœʁdə]; plural: börden [ˈbœʁdn̩]) is a region of highly fertile lowland in North Germany, a "fertile plain". These landscapes often cover great areas and are particularly important for arable farming on account of their rich soils.

These regions coincide closely with areas of flat, fertile loess soil and few trees. Börden are found in Germany, especially in the North German Old Drift region on the northern edges of Central Uplands. The resulting black earth soils are some of the best soils in Germany.

== Etymology ==
These landscapes are restricted to, or concentrated on, those regions where the Eastphalian and Westphalian dialects are spoken. There are two opposing explanations for the name. According to one, the term is connected with the Old High German word giburida ("judicial district") or the plattdeutsch word bören ("to bear"). The börde in this context is seen as a district in which the inhabitants had to "bear" public charges, i.e. it was effectively a taxation district. This may thus be a dialect variation of de:Bürde ("burden", "heavy load").

Because of the fertility of the börden another connexion has been made to the word bören, whose primary meaning was "yield" or "output", thus a börde would be a "land that produced a rich yield". Semasiological comparisons are made in this regard to the word tragen ("to carry", "to bear"): the related words Ertrag ("yield") and Getreide ("grain") stem from the Middle High German getregede ("that which is borne"). In the heraldic motto of the House of Alsleben is the term Vorborde, which is translated today as "for the ancestral land".

== Geomorphology ==
Börden extend from the North German geest to the perimeter of the German Central Uplands and consist of loess that has been predominantly deposited by east winds. In some places the loess lies over boulder clay (on the rivers Weser, Leine and Oker), in others over Mesozoic and Tertiary sedimentary rocks (in the Hellwegbörden and the foreland of the Harz Mountains). The loess layers are up to 10 metres thick and tend to attenuate differences in relief. In the (sub-)oceanic climatic region the loess has been largely decalcified and loamified. The northern edge of the loess region is not only a soil and vegetation boundary, but also a settlement zone - cities like Minden, Hanover or Magdeburg lie on the loess boundary.

== Börde as a name ==
=== Landscapes with the name "Börde" ===
- Brunswick-Hildesheim Loess Börde, including the Hildesheim, Ilsede and Lebenstedt Börde
- Calenberg Loess Börde
- Fritzlar Börde
- Heberbörde of the Heber
- Hellweg Börde, including the Soest, the Geseke and the Werl-Unna Börde
- Hildesheim Börde
- Jülich-Zülpich Börde or the individual Zülpich Börde, Jülich Börde and Erkelenz Börde
- Magdeburg Börde (High and Low Börde)
- Soest Börde
- Warburg Börde

=== Districts with the name Börde ===
- the former Bördekreis (Saxony-Anhalt)
- the district of Börde (Saxony-Anhalt)

=== Administrative units with the name Börde ===
- Westliche Börde, a collective municipality in Saxony-Anhalt
- Börde Lamstedt, a collective municipality in Lower Saxony

=== Towns and villages with the name Börde ===
- Niedere Börde (Saxony-Anhalt)
- Bördeland (Saxony-Anhalt)
- Hohe Börde (Saxony-Anhalt)
- Bördeaue (Saxony-Anhalt)
- Stadt Wanzleben-Börde (Saxony-Anhalt)

=== Roads, squares and town quarters with the name Börde ===
- Potthoffs Börde and Hüskenbörde (two neighbouring roads in Essen)

== See also ==
- Beauce and the terms Gau and Gäu as part of the name of various landscapes or administrative districts

== Literature ==
- Wilhelm Strumfels, Heinz Bischof: Unsere Ortsnamen – im ABC erklärt nach Herkunft und Bedeutung. 3rd edn., Ferd. Dümmlers Verlag, Bonn, 1961.
