= Soil value =

Soil value (German: Bodenwertzahl) or BWZ is a comparative assessment of soil quality used in Germany. It is determined from soil sampling data and ranges from 0 (very low) to 100 (very high).

According to the Geological Service of the state of North Rhine-Westphalia, the soil value of arable land is based on a field assessment framework which combines an assessment of soil type, soil condition (soil development) and the parent material of which the soil is composed. The result, the soil value, expresses the relative net income that, under normal and proper management, is determined only by the profitability of the soil. Additions or deductions in this value to take account of variations in yield due to terrain and climate (e.g. average annual temperature) give the field value (Ackerzahl).

== Range of values ==
The following colour scheme is used referring to the soil quality for certain ranges of values:

Soil quality	Range of values	Color
Very poor	0–18	brown
Poor	18–35	red
Medium	35–55	orange
High	55–75	yellow
Very High	75–100	green

The values exhibited by different types of soil are:

Type of soil	Range of values
Sand	0–11
Sandy loam	11–30
Heavy to clayey loam	31–50
Loam, partly with loess covering	51–70
Loam with loess covering	71–90
Loess	91–100

== Origins ==
As a yardstick for soil quality, a "Reich Standard Farm" was set up during the Third Reich in the parish of Eickendorf in the Magdeburger Börde, an exceptionally rich arable region. During the Reich Soil Assessment (Reichsbodenschätzung) following the Soil Assessment Act in 1934 a soil value of 100 was established in the leading Reich farm of Haberhauffe/Jäger. It was the basis of comparison for the tax rating of farms in Germany. Since this farm was no longer available for comparisons within West Germany after the Second World War, a farm in Machtsum near Harsum in the Hildesheim Börde was designated as the Federal Standard Farm. During later measurements, an even higher value of BWZ – 102.8 – was measured in Mölme, about 20 km east of Hildesheim within the municipality of Söhlde. It is the highest value ever recorded in Germany.

Another measure, the field value (Ackerzahl), is derived from the soil value, taking account of other factors such as climate and location e.g. along the edge of woodland.

== See also ==
- Soil classification
- Soil quality
- Soil science
- Soil Use Efficiency
- Crop yield
