= Zens, Saxony-Anhalt =

Coordinates: 51°56′N 11°43′E

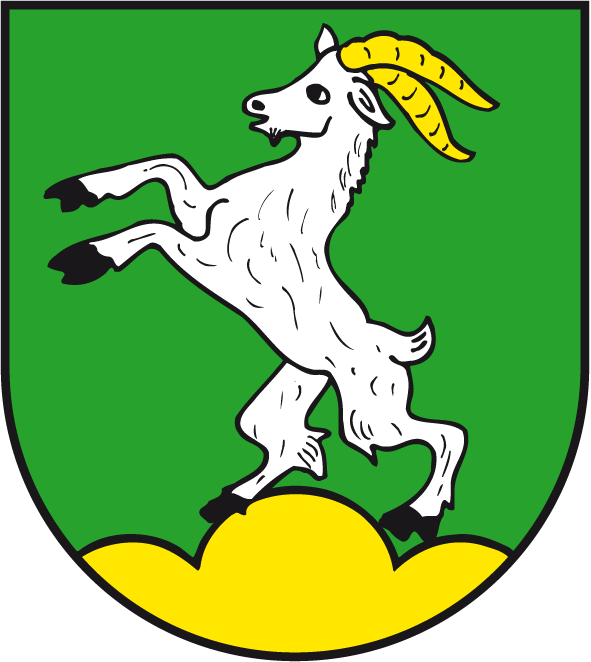
Coat of arms Zens

Zens is a former municipality in the district of Salzlandkreis, in Saxony-Anhalt, Germany. Since January 2008, it is part of the municipality Bördeland.

== See also ==
- Biere
- Eggersdorf
- Eickendorf
- Großmühlingen
- Kleinmühlingen
- Welsleben
