= Niedere Börde =

- Municipality
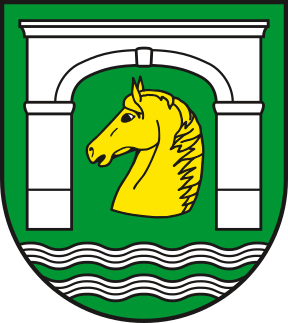
- Coat of arms

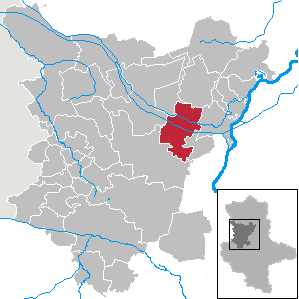
- Location of Niedere Börde within Börde district
- Interactive map of Niedere Börde
- Location within Germany Location within Saxony-Anhalt
- Coordinates: 52°14′N 11°31′E
- Country: Germany
- State: Saxony-Anhalt
- District: Börde

Government
  - Mayor (2018–25): Stefan Müller

Area
  - Total: 77.88 km^{2} (30.07 sq mi)
- Elevation: 89 m (292 ft)

Population (2025-12-31)
  - Total: 6,635
  - Density: 85.20/km^{2} (220.7/sq mi)
- Time zone: UTC+01:00 (CET)
  - Summer (DST): UTC+02:00 (CEST)
- Postal codes: 39326, 39345
- Dialling codes: 039201, 039202
- Vehicle registration: BK
- Website: www.niedere-boerde.de

Niedere Börde (German pronunciation: [ˈniːdəʁə ˈbœʁdə], lit. 'Lower Börde') is a municipality in the Börde district in Saxony-Anhalt, Germany. It is situated between Haldensleben and Magdeburg. It was formed in January 2004 by the merger of the former municipalities Dahlenwarsleben, Groß Ammensleben, Gutenswegen, Jersleben, Klein Ammensleben, Meseberg, Samswegen and Vahldorf.
