= Biere, Germany =

Coordinates: 51°58′N 11°39′E

Coat of arms

Biere is a former municipality in the district of Salzlandkreis, in Saxony-Anhalt, Germany. Since January 2008, the village has belonged to the municipality of Bördeland.

== History ==
The town of Biere, the greatest in its municipality, had a city (Stadt) status. It is currently the administrative seat of Bördeland.

== See also ==
- Eggersdorf
- Eickendorf
- Großmühlingen
- Kleinmühlingen
- Welsleben
- Zens
