= Ochtmersleben =

- Ortsteil of Hohe Börde
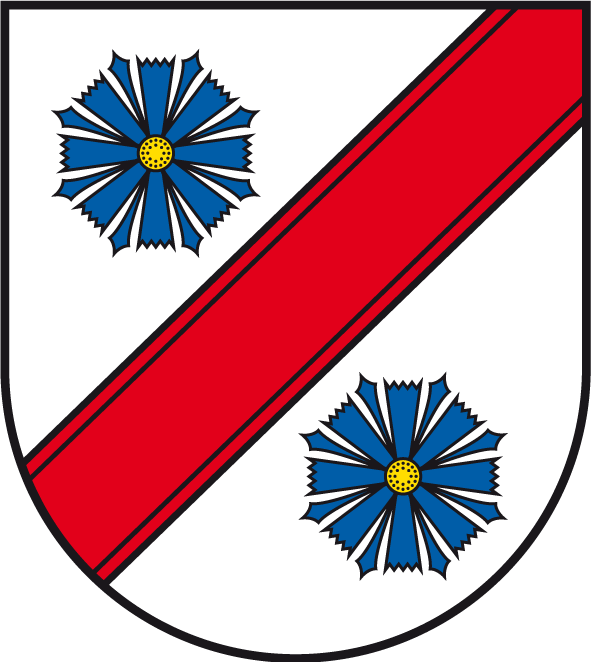
- Coat of arms
- Interactive map of Ochtmersleben
- Location within Germany Location within Saxony-Anhalt
- Coordinates: 52°10′N 11°25′E
- Country: Germany
- State: Saxony-Anhalt
- District: Börde
- Municipality: Hohe Börde

Area
  - Total: 9.41 km^{2} (3.63 sq mi)
- Elevation: 129 m (423 ft)

Population (2006-12-31)
  - Total: 571
  - Density: 60.7/km^{2} (157/sq mi)
- Time zone: UTC+01:00 (CET)
  - Summer (DST): UTC+02:00 (CEST)
- Postal codes: 39167
- Dialling codes: 039206
- Vehicle registration: BK
- Website: www.ochtmersleben.de

Ochtmersleben is a village and a former municipality in the Börde district in Saxony-Anhalt, Germany. Since 1 January 2010, it is part of the municipality Hohe Börde.
