= Rottmersleben =

- Ortsteil of Hohe Börde
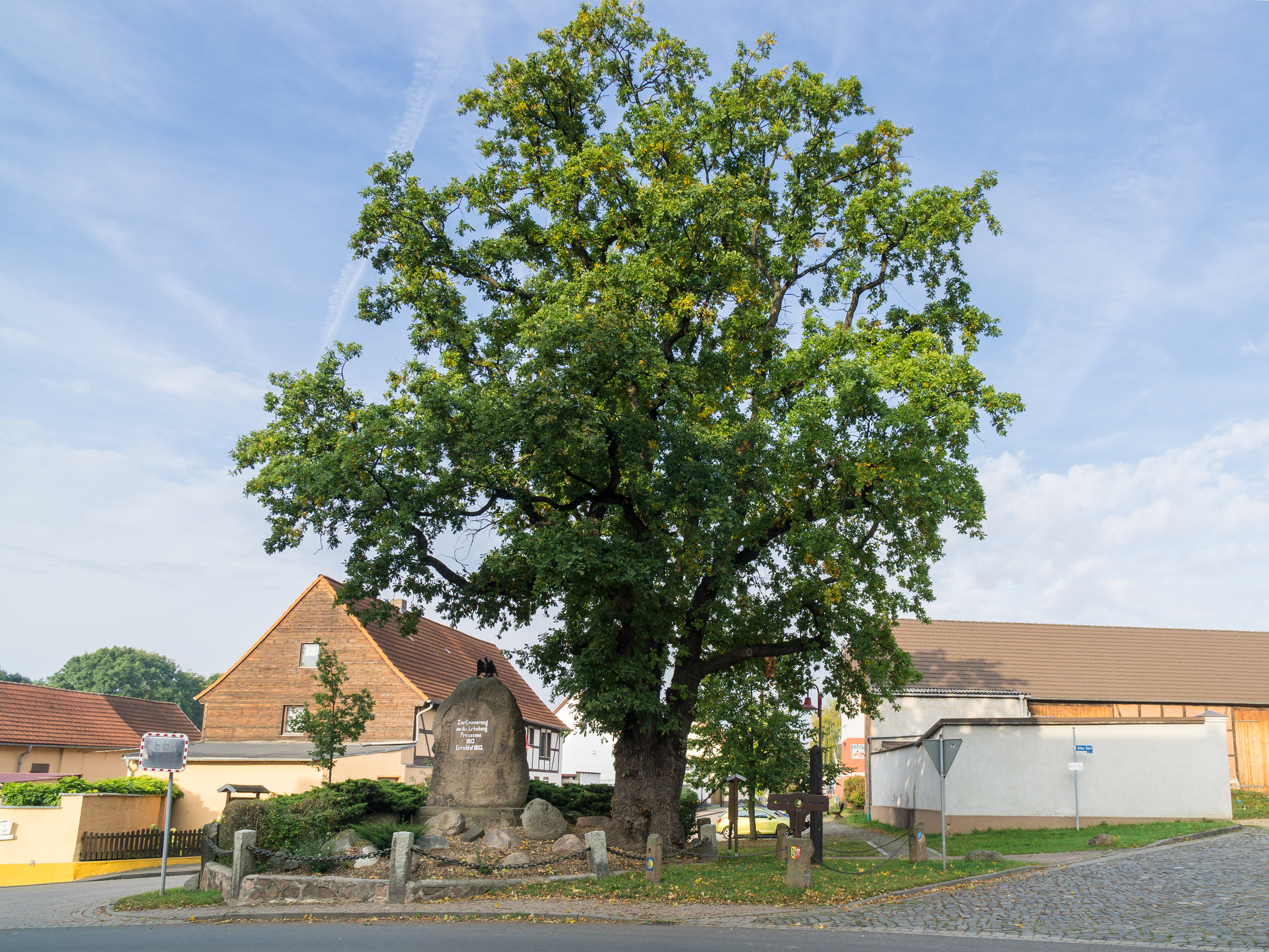

- Coat of arms
- Interactive map of Rottmersleben
- Location within Germany Location within Saxony-Anhalt
- Coordinates: 52°13′N 11°24′E
- Country: Germany
- State: Saxony-Anhalt
- District: Börde
- Municipality: Hohe Börde

Area
  - Total: 11.32 km^{2} (4.37 sq mi)
- Elevation: 101 m (331 ft)

Population (2009-12-31)
  - Total: 720
  - Density: 64/km^{2} (160/sq mi)
- Time zone: UTC+01:00 (CET)
  - Summer (DST): UTC+02:00 (CEST)
- Postal codes: 39343
- Dialling codes: 039206
- Vehicle registration: BK

Rottmersleben is a village and a former municipality in the Börde district in Saxony-Anhalt, Germany. Since 1/09/2010, it is part of the municipality Hohe Börde.
