= Groß Santersleben =

- Ortsteil of Hohe Börde
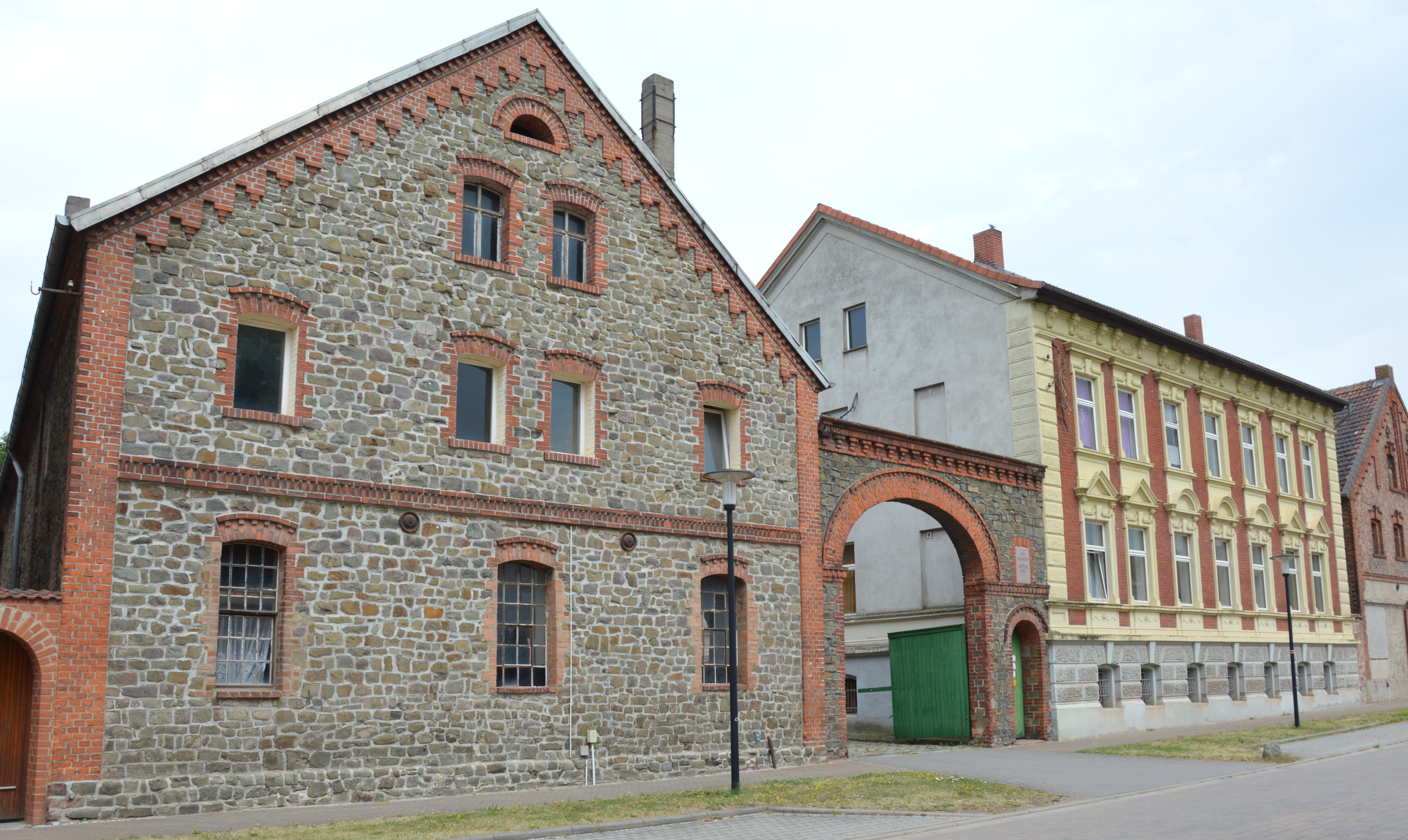

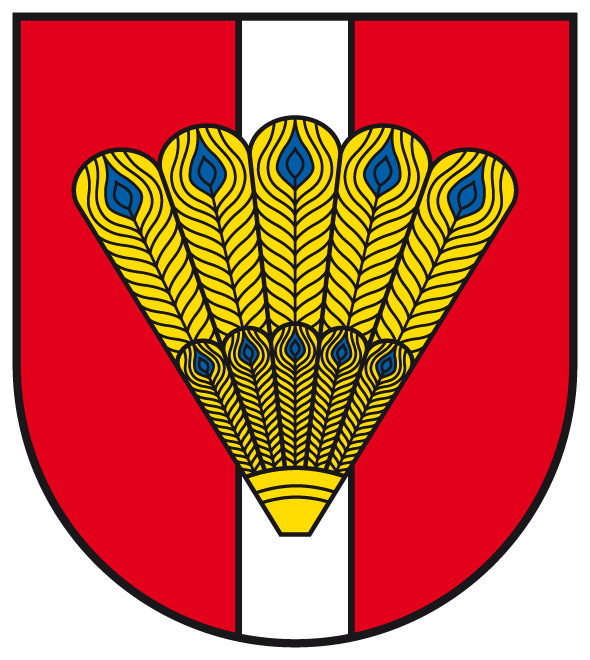
- Coat of arms
- Interactive map of Groß Santersleben
- Location within Germany Location within Saxony-Anhalt
- Coordinates: 52°11′N 11°27′E
- Country: Germany
- State: Saxony-Anhalt
- District: Börde
- Municipality: Hohe Börde

Area
  - Total: 7.09 km^{2} (2.74 sq mi)
- Elevation: 133 m (436 ft)

Population (2006-12-31)
  - Total: 1,050
  - Density: 148/km^{2} (384/sq mi)
- Time zone: UTC+01:00 (CET)
  - Summer (DST): UTC+02:00 (CEST)
- Postal codes: 39343
- Dialling codes: 039206
- Website: www.gross-santersleben.de

Groß Santersleben is a village and a former municipality in the Börde district in Saxony-Anhalt, Germany. Since 1 January 2010, it has been part of the Hohe Börde municipality.
