= Hermsdorf, Saxony-Anhalt =

Hermsdorf
- Ortsteil of Hohe Börde
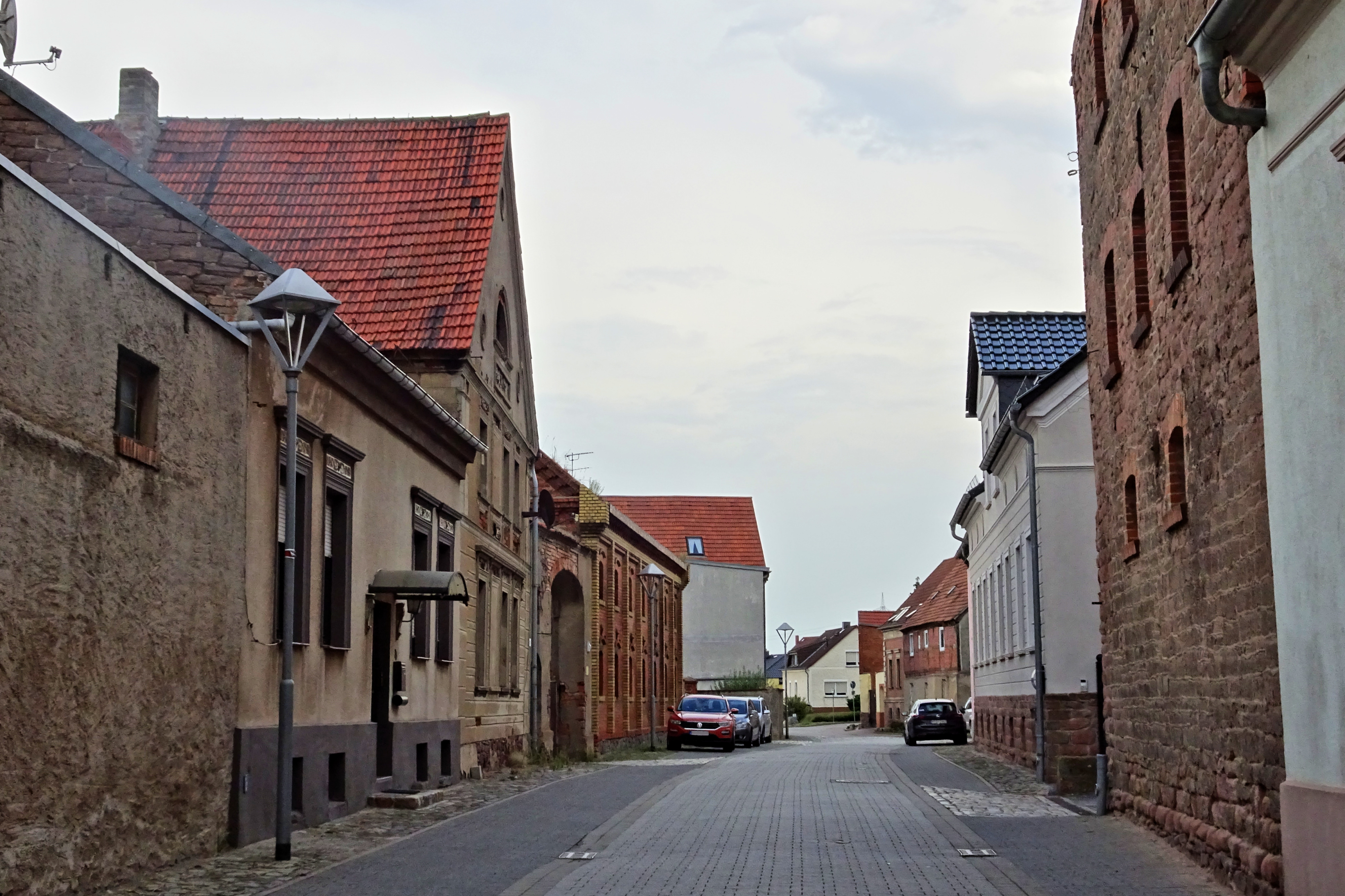
- Interactive map of Hermsdorf
- Location within Germany Location within Saxony-Anhalt
- Coordinates: 52°11′N 11°29′E
- Country: Germany
- State: Saxony-Anhalt
- District: Börde
- Municipality: Hohe Börde

Area
  - Total: 7.55 km^{2} (2.92 sq mi)
- Elevation: 130 m (430 ft)

Population (2006-12-31)
  - Total: 1,601
  - Density: 212/km^{2} (549/sq mi)
- Time zone: UTC+01:00 (CET)
  - Summer (DST): UTC+02:00 (CEST)
- Postal codes: 39326
- Dialling codes: 039206
- Vehicle registration: BK

Hermsdorf (German pronunciation: [ˈhɛʁmsˌdɔʁf]) is a village and a former municipality in the Börde district in Saxony-Anhalt, Germany. Since 1 January 2010, it is part of the municipality Hohe Börde.
