= Nordgermersleben =

- Ortsteil of Hohe Börde
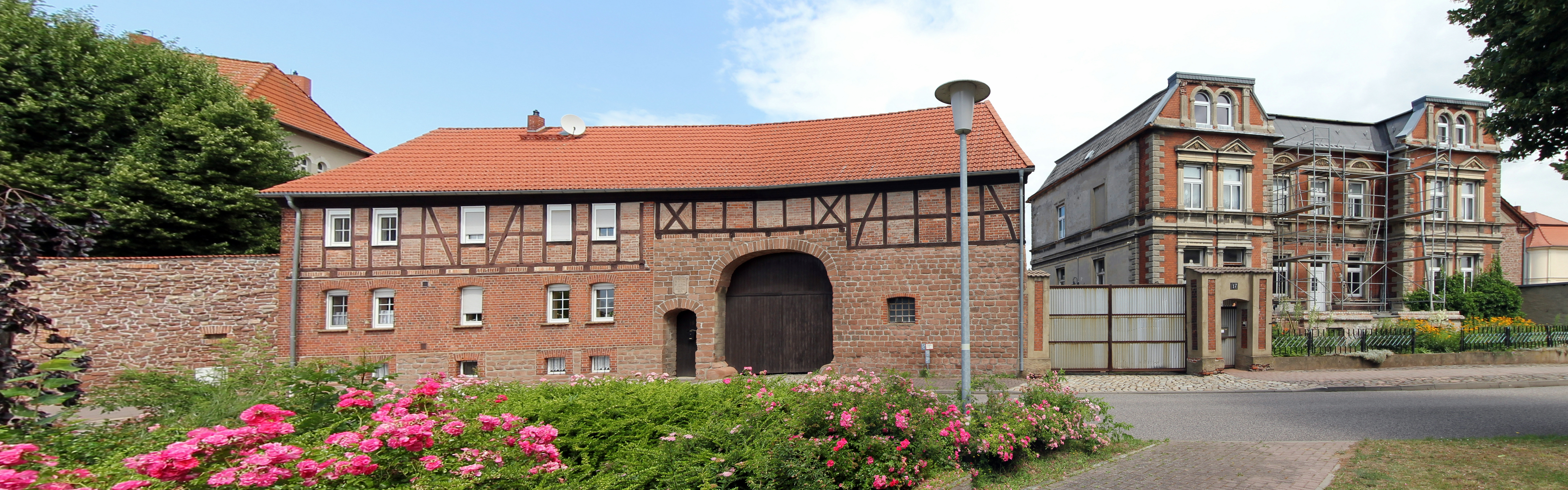

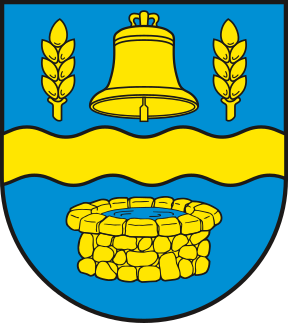
- Coat of arms
- Interactive map of Nordgermersleben
- Location within Germany Location within Saxony-Anhalt
- Coordinates: 52°13′N 11°20′E
- Country: Germany
- State: Saxony-Anhalt
- District: Börde
- Municipality: Hohe Börde

Area
  - Total: 19.12 km^{2} (7.38 sq mi)
- Elevation: 110 m (360 ft)

Population (2006-12-31)
  - Total: 921
  - Density: 48.2/km^{2} (125/sq mi)
- Time zone: UTC+01:00 (CET)
  - Summer (DST): UTC+02:00 (CEST)
- Postal codes: 39343
- Dialling codes: 039062

Nordgermersleben is a village and a former municipality in the Börde district in Saxony-Anhalt, Germany. Since 1 January 2010, it is part of the municipality Hohe Börde. The municipality encompassed the villages of Tundersleben and Brumby, both located on the Bundesstraße 1 highway running from Braunschweig to Magdeburg.
