= Hohenwarsleben =

- Ortsteil of Hohe Börde
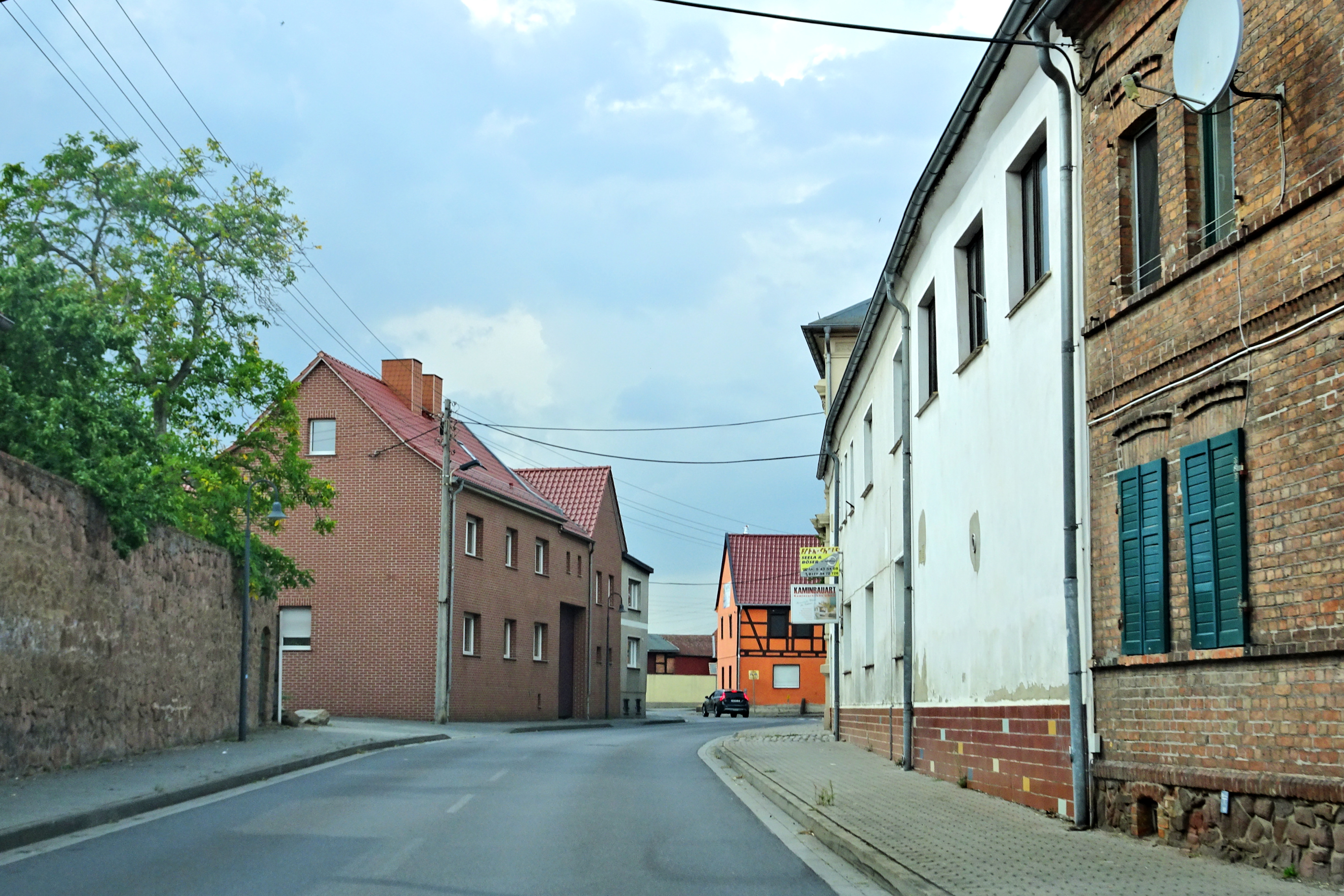

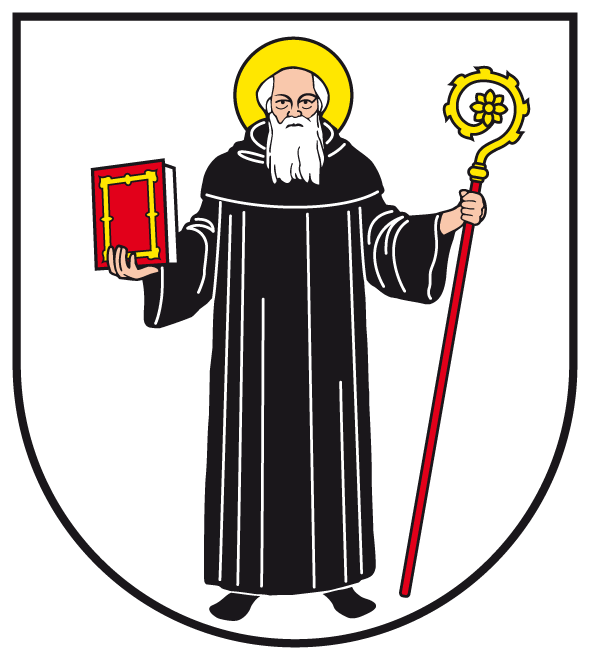
- Coat of arms
- Interactive map of Hohenwarsleben
- Location within Germany Location within Saxony-Anhalt
- Coordinates: 52°10′N 11°30′E
- Country: Germany
- State: Saxony-Anhalt
- District: Börde
- Municipality: Hohe Börde

Area
  - Total: 8.12 km^{2} (3.14 sq mi)
- Elevation: 108 m (354 ft)

Population (2006-12-31)
  - Total: 1,577
  - Density: 194/km^{2} (503/sq mi)
- Time zone: UTC+01:00 (CET)
  - Summer (DST): UTC+02:00 (CEST)
- Postal codes: 39326
- Dialling codes: 039204
- Vehicle registration: BK

Hohenwarsleben is a village and a former municipality in the Börde district in Saxony-Anhalt, Germany. Since 1 January 2010, it is part of the municipality of Hohe Börde.

Hohenwarsleben is located close to the city of Magdeburg, capital of Saxony-Anhalt. As a result of its location, the village is inhabited by many people, who work in Magdeburg and only live in the village. Within 20 min, by car, Magdeburg could be reached via the B1 (country road) or within 10 min via the highway.
