= Hohe Börde =

- Municipality
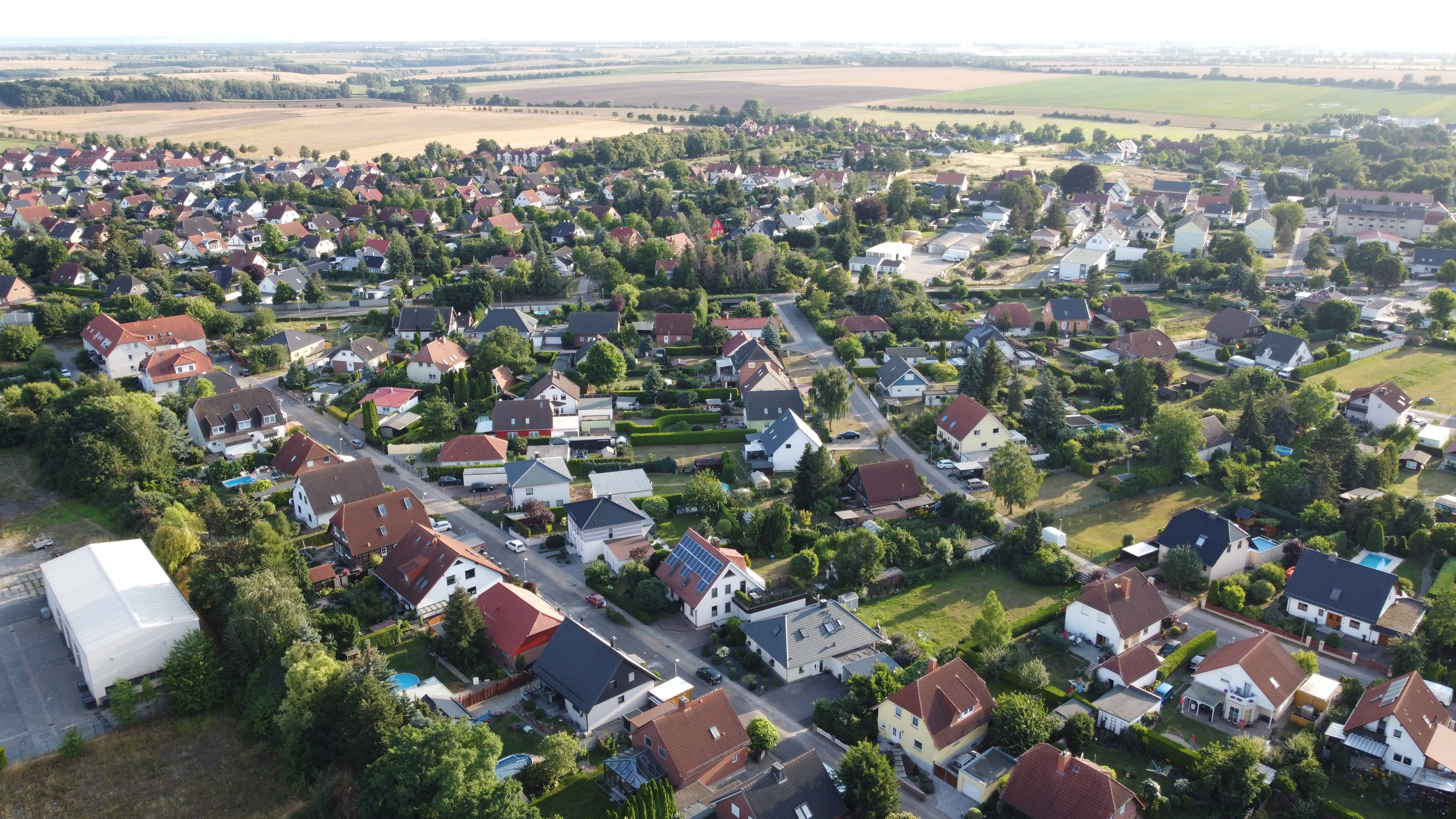

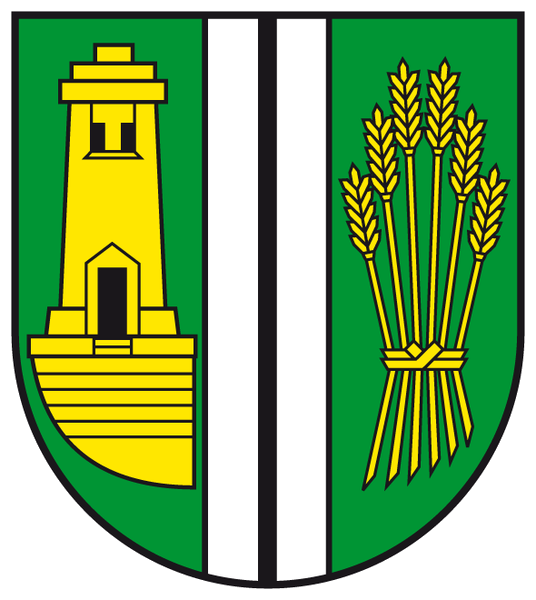
- Coat of arms

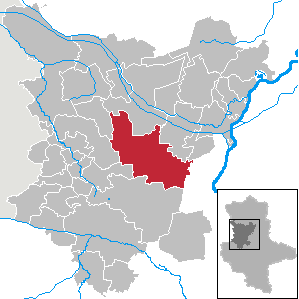
- Location of Hohe Börde within Börde district
- Interactive map of Hohe Börde
- Location within Germany Location within Saxony-Anhalt
- Coordinates: 52°10′N 11°29′E
- Country: Germany
- State: Saxony-Anhalt
- District: Börde

Government
  - Mayor (2023–30): Andreas Burger

Area
  - Total: 171.61 km^{2} (66.26 sq mi)

Population (2025-12-31)
  - Total: 18,648
  - Density: 108.66/km^{2} (281.44/sq mi)
- Time zone: UTC+01:00 (CET)
  - Summer (DST): UTC+02:00 (CEST)
- Postal codes: 39167, 39326, 39343
- Dialling codes: 039062, 039202, 039204, 039206
- Vehicle registration: BK, OK
- Website: www.hohe-boerde.de

Hohe Börde (German pronunciation: [ˈhoːə ˈbœʁdə], lit. 'High Börde') is a municipality in the Börde district in Saxony-Anhalt, Germany. It was formed on 1 January 2010 by the merger of the former municipalities Ackendorf, Bebertal, Eichenbarleben, Groß Santersleben, Hermsdorf, Hohenwarsleben, Irxleben, Niederndodeleben, Nordgermersleben, Ochtmersleben, Schackensleben and Wellen. On 1 September 2010 it absorbed Bornstedt and Rottmersleben. These 14 former municipalities are now Ortschaften or municipal divisions of Hohe Börde.
