= Bornstedt, Börde =

Bornstedt
- Ortsteil of Hohe Börde
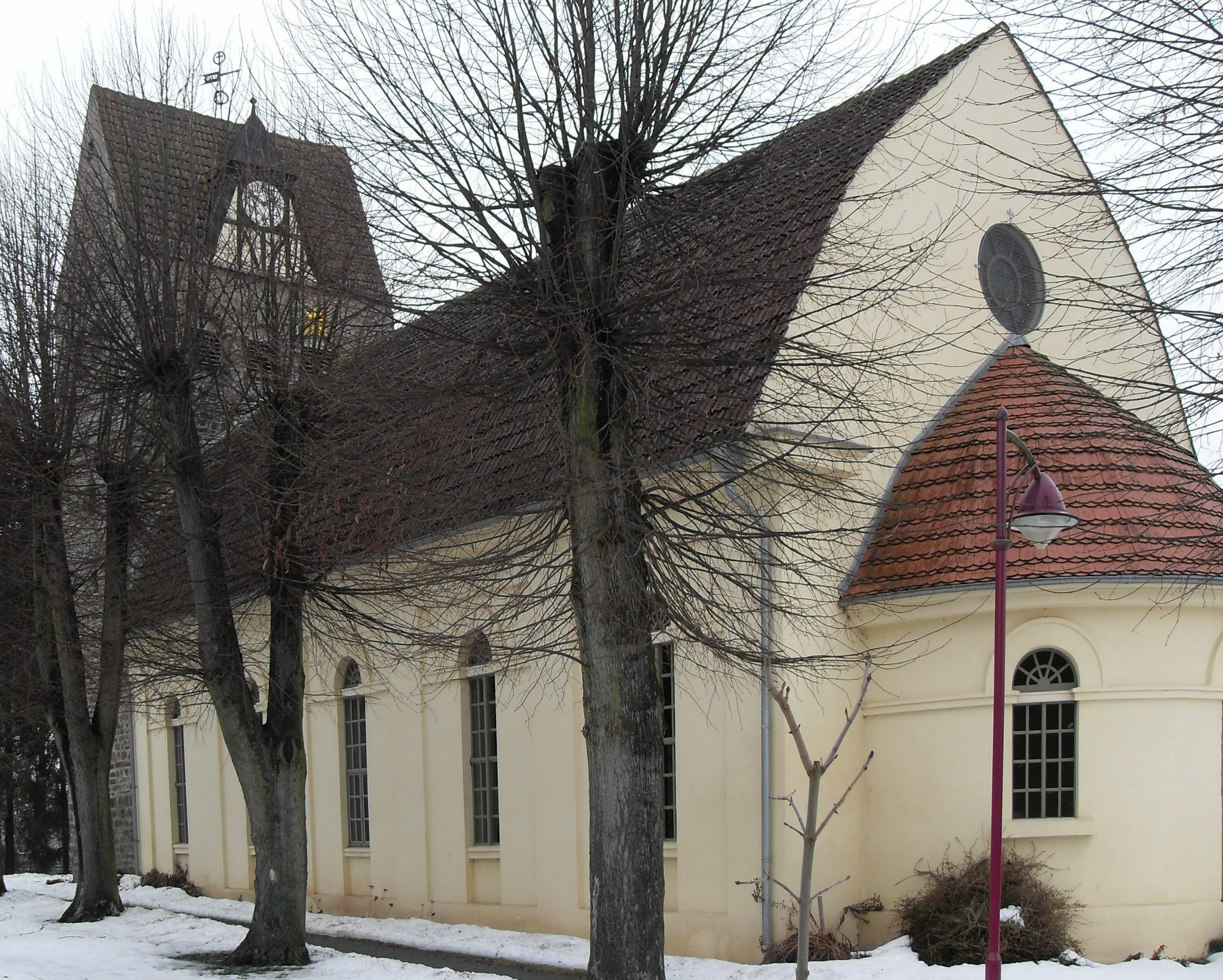
- Southeast side of St. Mauritius Church, Bornstedt

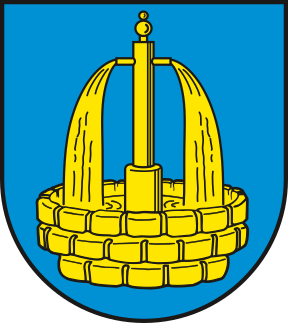
- Coat of arms
- Interactive map of Bornstedt
- Location within Germany Location within Saxony-Anhalt
- Coordinates: 52°11′N 11°21′E
- Country: Germany
- State: Saxony-Anhalt
- District: Börde
- Municipality: Hohe Börde

Area
  - Total: 7.18 km^{2} (2.77 sq mi)
- Elevation: 123 m (404 ft)

Population (2009-12-31)
  - Total: 452
  - Density: 63.0/km^{2} (163/sq mi)
- Time zone: UTC+01:00 (CET)
  - Summer (DST): UTC+02:00 (CEST)
- Postal codes: 39343
- Dialling codes: 039206

Bornstedt (German pronunciation: [ˈbɔʁnʃtɛt]) is a village and a former municipality in the Börde district in Saxony-Anhalt, Germany. Since 1 September 2010, it is part of the municipality Hohe Börde.
