= Schackensleben =

- Ortsteil of Hohe Börde
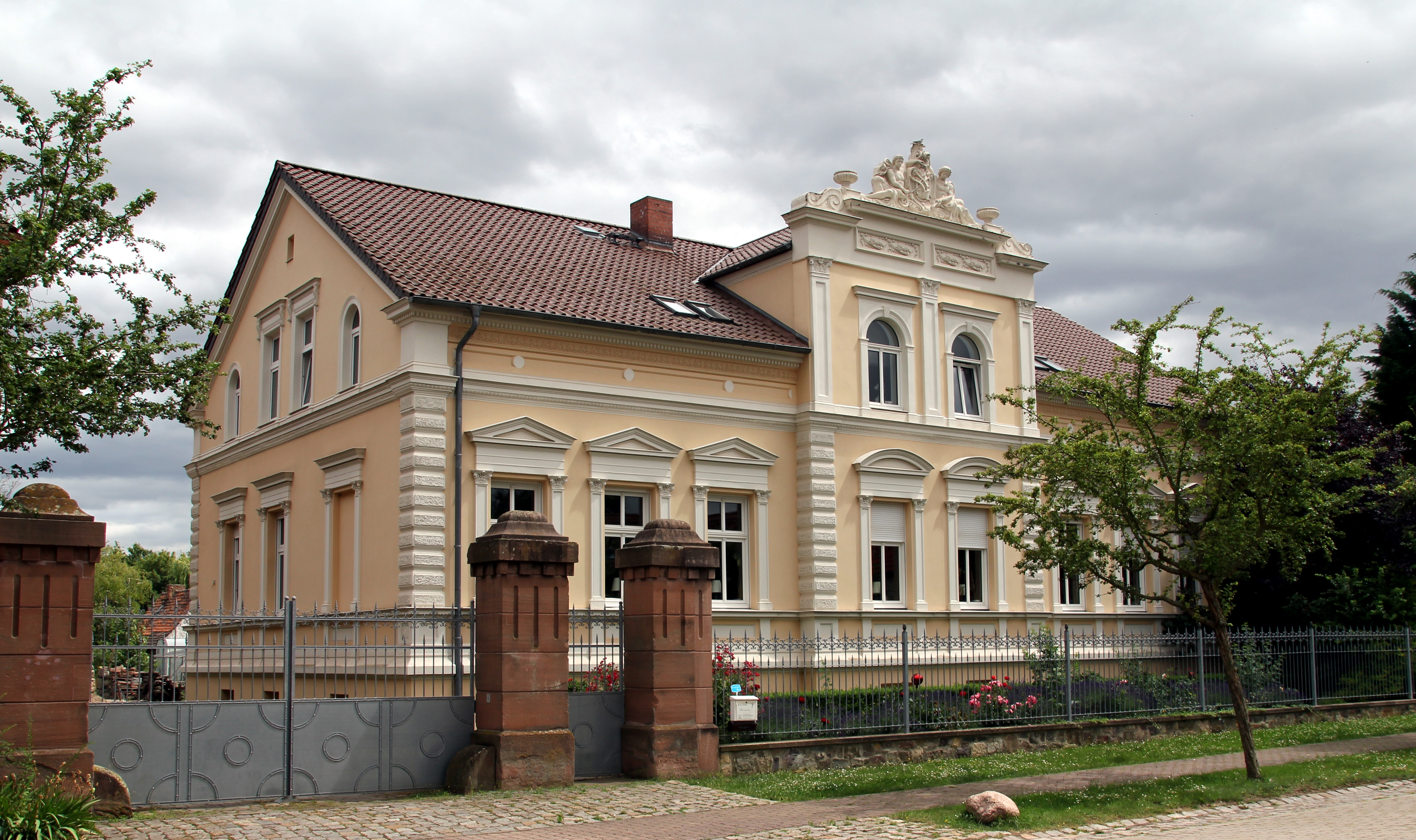

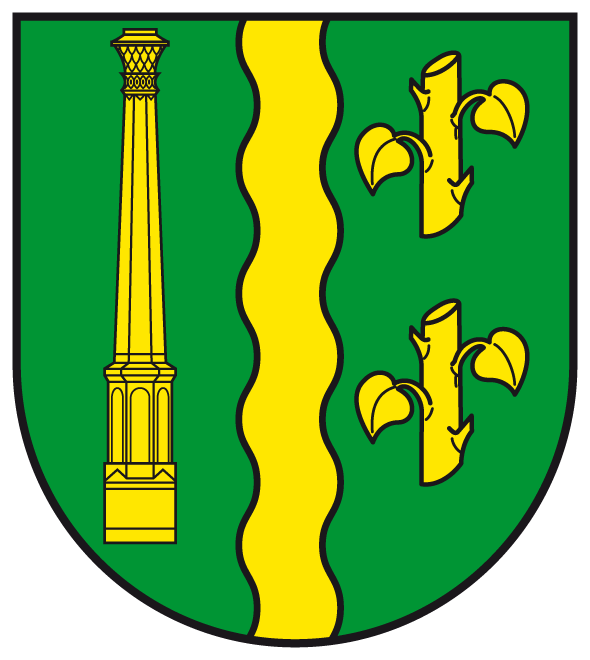
- Coat of arms
- Interactive map of Schackensleben
- Location within Germany Location within Saxony-Anhalt
- Coordinates: 52°12′N 11°25′E
- Country: Germany
- State: Saxony-Anhalt
- District: Börde
- Municipality: Hohe Börde

Area
  - Total: 11.66 km^{2} (4.50 sq mi)
- Elevation: 100 m (330 ft)

Population (2006-12-31)
  - Total: 715
  - Density: 61.3/km^{2} (159/sq mi)
- Time zone: UTC+01:00 (CET)
  - Summer (DST): UTC+02:00 (CEST)
- Postal codes: 39343
- Dialling codes: 039206
- Vehicle registration: BK

Schackensleben is a village and a former municipality in the Börde district in Saxony-Anhalt, Germany. Since 1 January 2010, it is part of the municipality Hohe Börde.
