= Wellen, Saxony-Anhalt =

Wellen
- Ortsteil of Hohe Börde
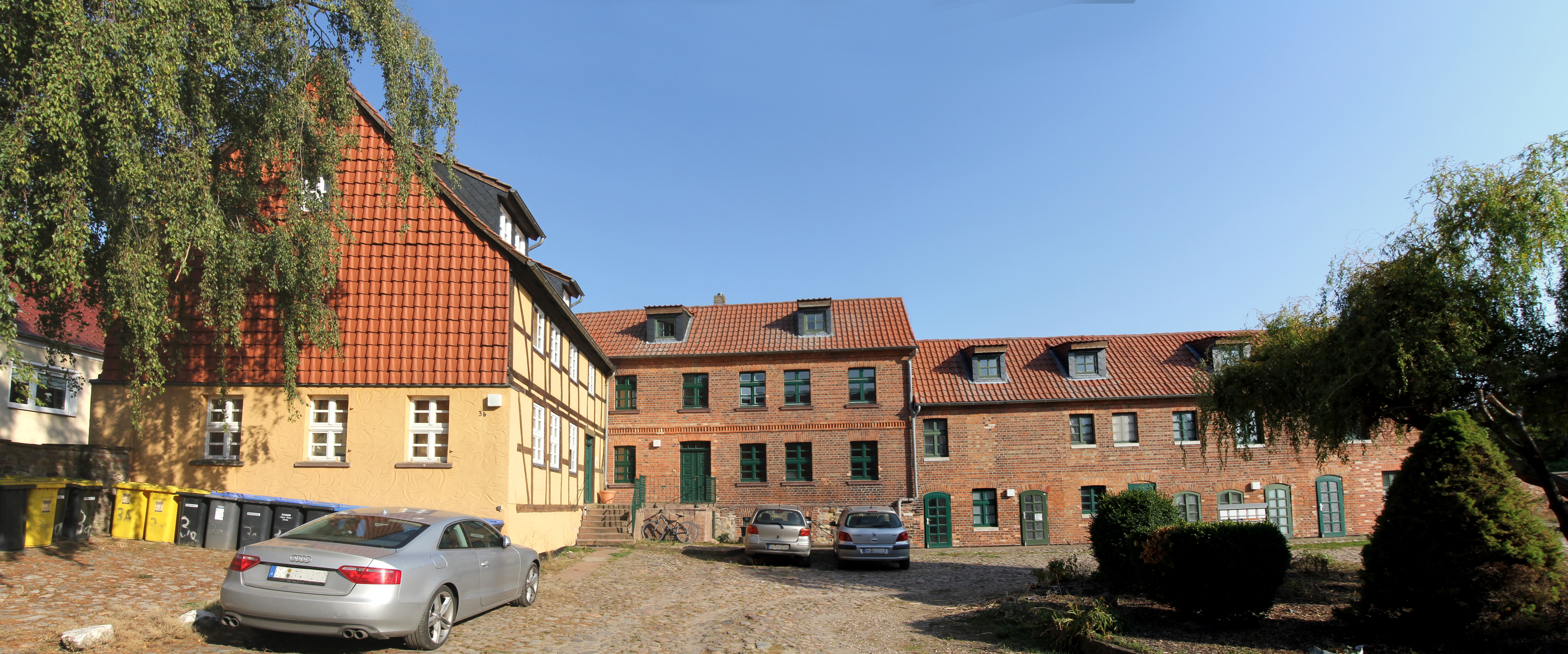

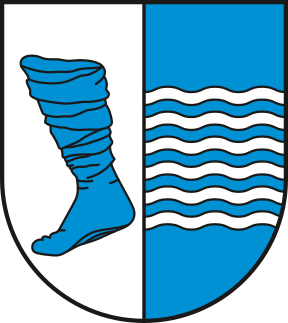
- Coat of arms
- Interactive map of Wellen
- Location within Germany Location within Saxony-Anhalt
- Coordinates: 52°09′N 11°26′E
- Country: Germany
- State: Saxony-Anhalt
- District: Börde
- Municipality: Hohe Börde

Area
  - Total: 10.37 km^{2} (4.00 sq mi)
- Elevation: 119 m (390 ft)

Population (2011)
  - Total: 1,250
  - Density: 121/km^{2} (312/sq mi)
- Time zone: UTC+01:00 (CET)
  - Summer (DST): UTC+02:00 (CEST)
- Postal codes: 39167
- Dialling codes: 039206

Wellen (German pronunciation: [ˈvɛlən]) is a village and a former municipality in the Börde district in Saxony-Anhalt, Germany. Since 1 January 2010, it is part of the municipality Hohe Börde.
