= Ackendorf =

- Ortsteil of Hohe Börde
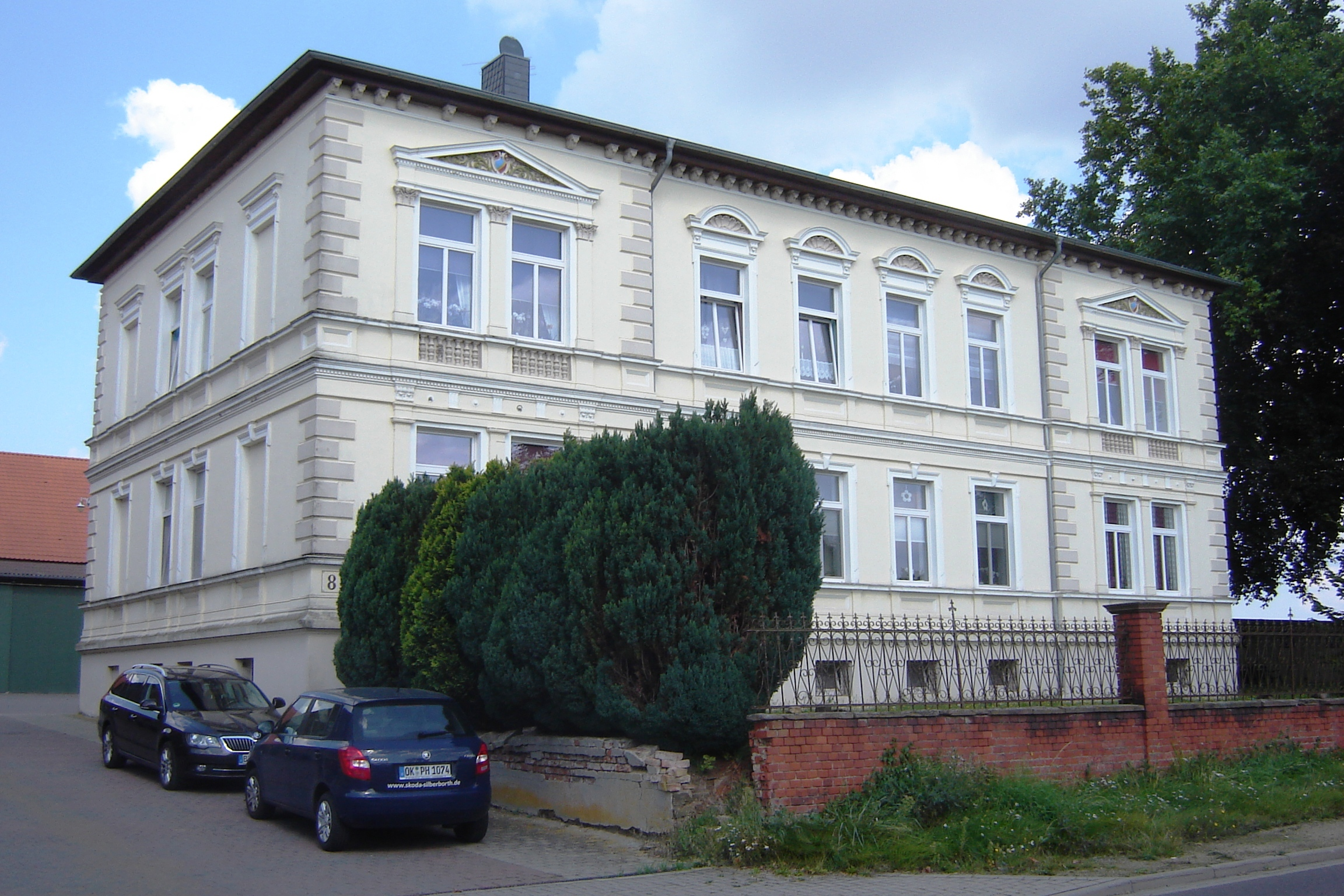

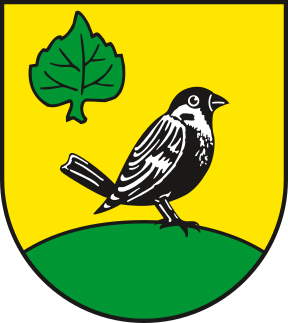
- Coat of arms
- Interactive map of Ackendorf
- Location within Germany Location within Saxony-Anhalt
- Coordinates: 52°13′N 11°26′E
- Country: Germany
- State: Saxony-Anhalt
- District: Börde
- Municipality: Hohe Börde

Area
  - Total: 6.94 km^{2} (2.68 sq mi)
- Elevation: 108 m (354 ft)

Population (2006-12-31)
  - Total: 418
  - Density: 60.2/km^{2} (156/sq mi)
- Time zone: UTC+01:00 (CET)
  - Summer (DST): UTC+02:00 (CEST)
- Postal codes: 39343
- Dialling codes: 039202
- Vehicle registration: BK
- Website: www.hohe-boerde.de

Ackendorf is a village and a former municipality in the Börde district in Saxony-Anhalt, Germany. Since 1 January 2010, it is part of the municipality Hohe Börde.
