= Niederndodeleben =

- Ortsteil of Hohe Börde
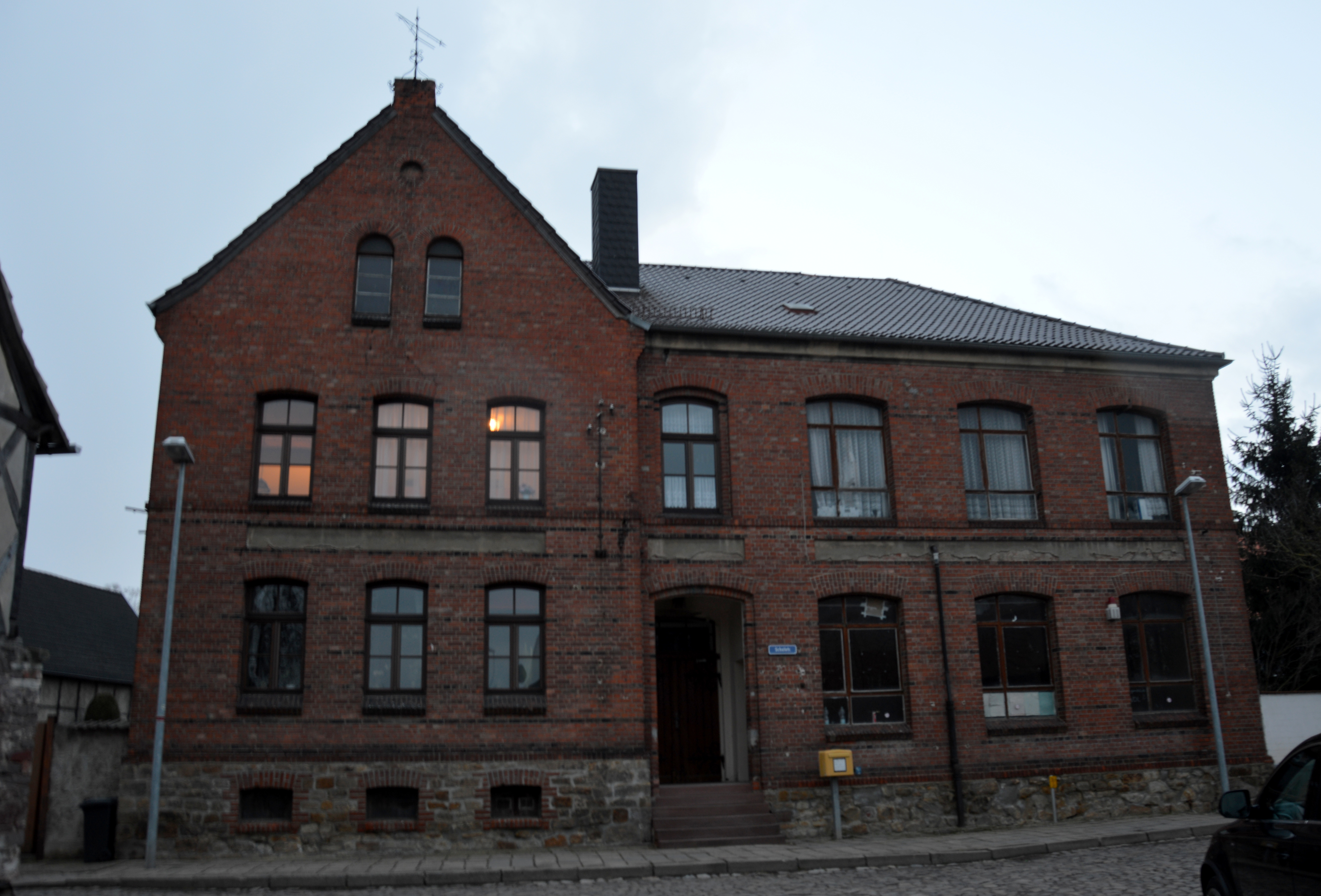

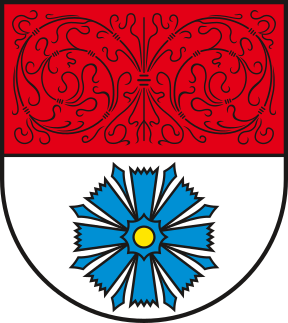
- Coat of arms
- Interactive map of Niederndodeleben
- Location within Germany Location within Saxony-Anhalt
- Coordinates: 52°8′4″N 11°29′55″E
- Country: Germany
- State: Saxony-Anhalt
- District: Börde
- Municipality: Hohe Börde

Area
  - Total: 28.11 km^{2} (10.85 sq mi)
- Elevation: 89 m (292 ft)

Population (2006-12-31)
  - Total: 4,204
  - Density: 149.6/km^{2} (387.3/sq mi)
- Time zone: UTC+01:00 (CET)
  - Summer (DST): UTC+02:00 (CEST)
- Postal codes: 39167
- Dialling codes: 039204
- Vehicle registration: BK
- Website: www.niederndodeleben.de

Niederndodeleben is a village and a former municipality in the Börde district in Saxony-Anhalt, Germany. Since 1 January 2010, it is part of the municipality Hohe Börde.
