= Irxleben =

- Ortsteil of Hohe Börde
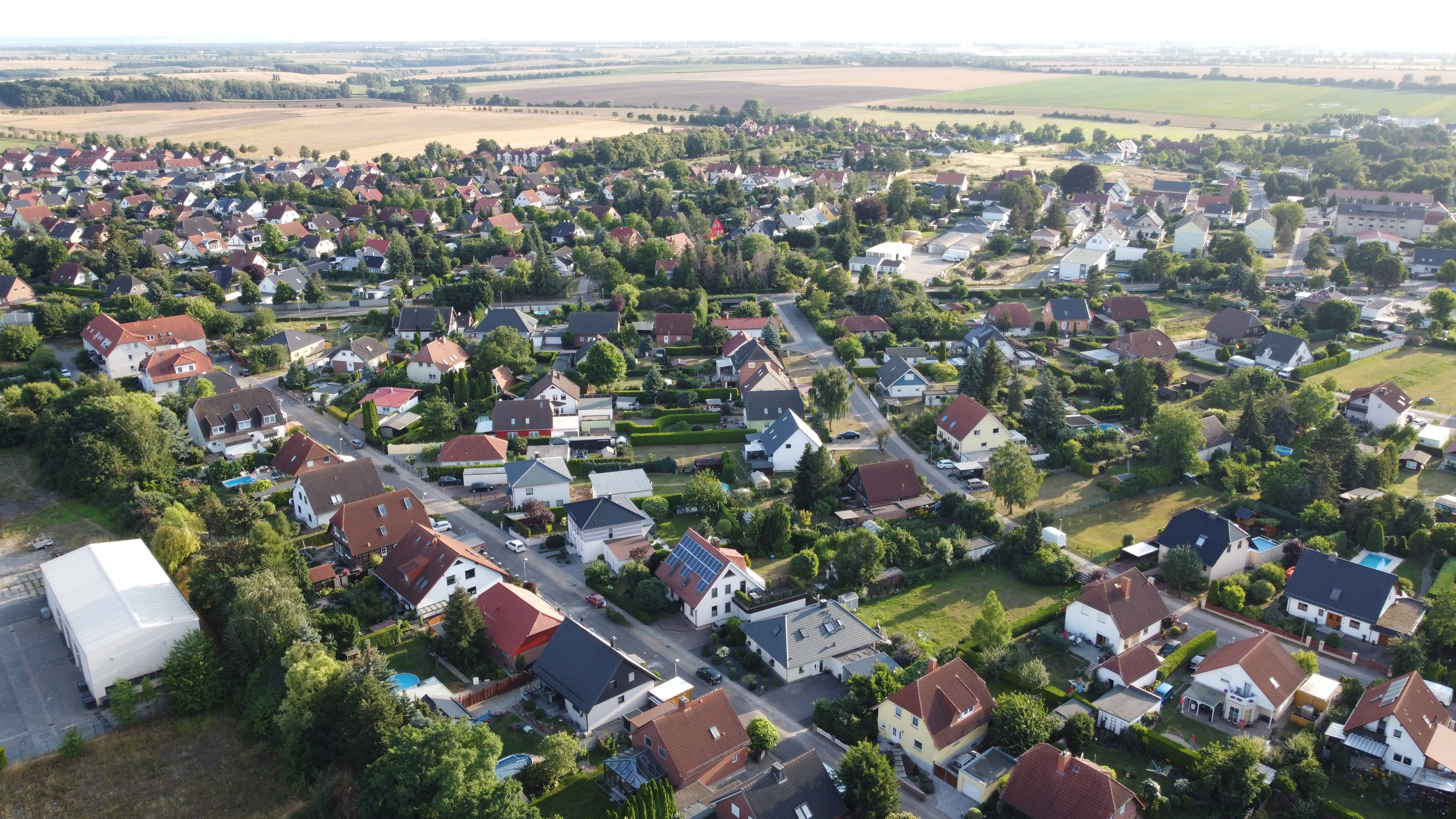

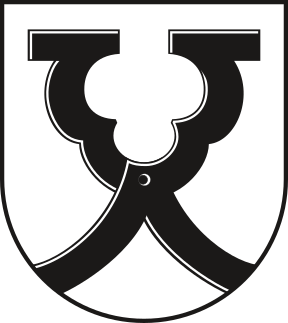
- Coat of arms
- Interactive map of Irxleben
- Location within Germany Location within Saxony-Anhalt
- Coordinates: 52°9′54″N 11°29′12″E
- Country: Germany
- State: Saxony-Anhalt
- District: Börde
- Municipality: Hohe Börde

Area
  - Total: 7.07 km^{2} (2.73 sq mi)
- Elevation: 129 m (423 ft)

Population (2006-12-31)
  - Total: 2,370
  - Density: 335/km^{2} (868/sq mi)
- Time zone: UTC+01:00 (CET)
  - Summer (DST): UTC+02:00 (CEST)
- Postal codes: 39167
- Dialling codes: 039204
- Vehicle registration: BK
- Website: www.irxleben.de

Irxleben is a village and a former municipality in the Börde district in Saxony-Anhalt, Germany. Since 1 January 2010, it is part of the municipality Hohe Börde.
