= Soil quality =

Capacity of soil to perform ecosystem services

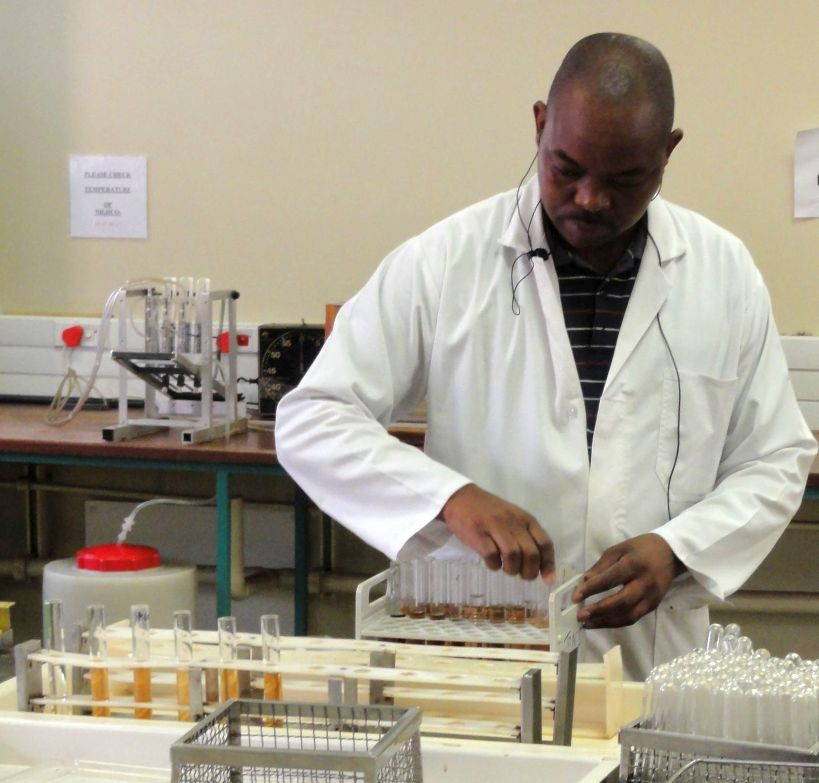
Testing soil fertility

Soil quality refers to the condition of soil based on its capacity to perform ecosystem services that meet the needs of human and non-human life.

Soil quality reflects how well a soil performs the functions of maintaining biodiversity and productivity, partitioning water and solute flow, filtering and buffering, nutrient cycling, and providing support for plants and other structures. Soil management has a major impact on soil quality.

Soil quality relates to soil functions. Unlike water or air, for which established standards have been set, soil quality is difficult to define or quantify.

== Indicators of soil quality ==
Soil quality can be evaluated using the Soil Management Assessment Framework. Soil quality in agricultural terms is measured on a scale of soil value (Bodenwertzahl) in Germany.

Soil quality is primarily measured by chemical, physical, and biological indicators because soil function cannot easily be measured directly. Each of these categories comprises several indicators that provide insight into overall soil quality. There are very few soil quality monitoring systems that can provide near real-time information on these indicators but almost all of these systems are currently reported only at the research level.

=== Physical ===
The physical category of soil quality indicators consists of tests that measure soil texture, bulk density, porosity, water content at saturation, aggregate stability, penetration resistance, and more. These measures provide hydrological information, such the level of water infiltration and water availability to plants.

=== Chemical ===
Chemical indicators include pH and nutrient levels. A typical soil test only evaluates chemical soil properties.

=== Biological ===
The movement and biological functions of soil organisms (including earthworms, millipedes, centipedes, ants, and spiders) impact soil processes such as the regulation of soil structure, degradation of contaminants, and nutrient cycling.
