= Bördeland =

- Municipality
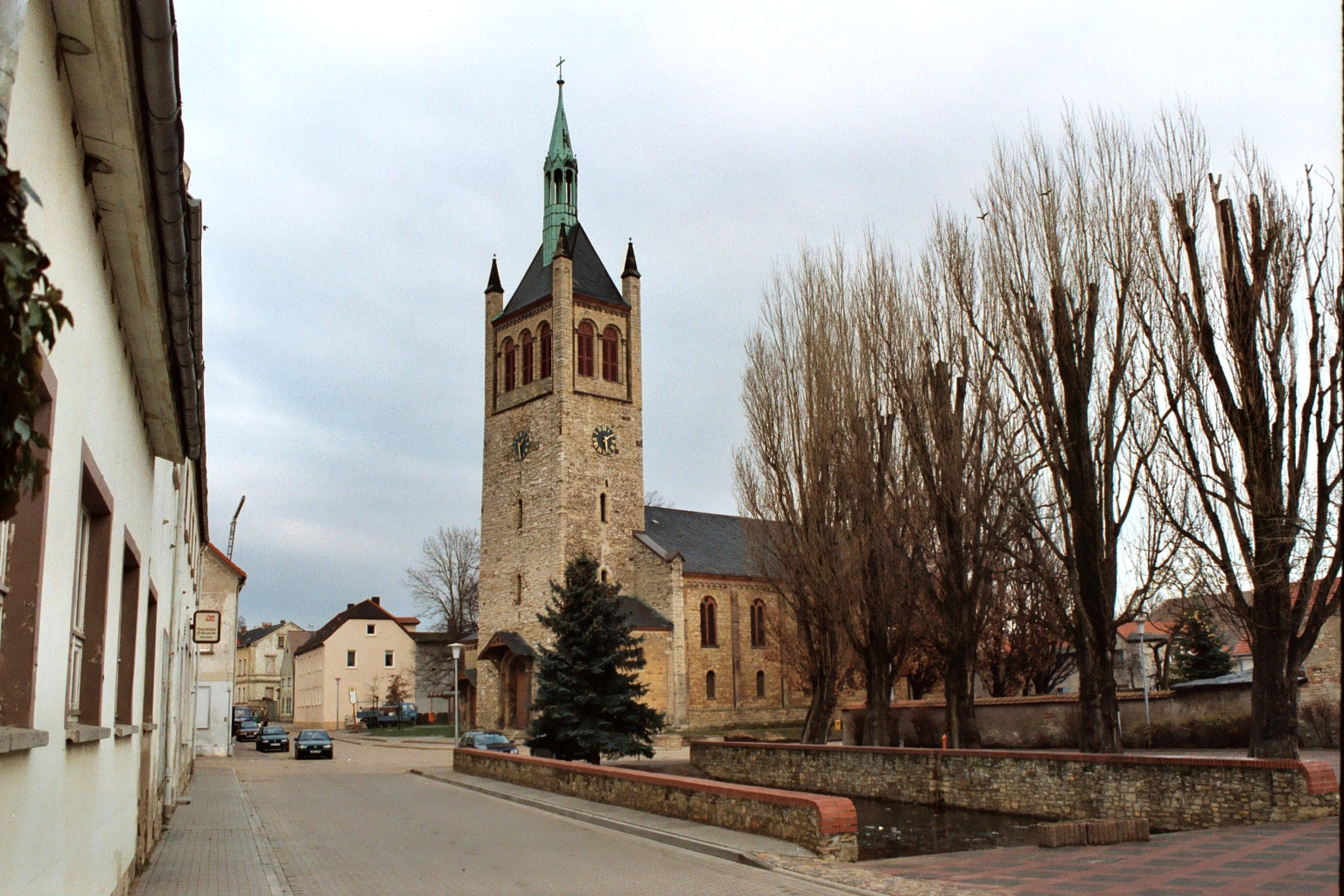
- Church of Saint Andrew in Biere

- Coat of arms

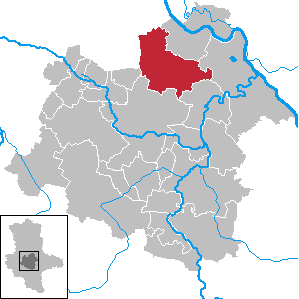
- Location of Bördeland within Salzlandkreis district
- Interactive map of Bördeland
- Location within Germany Location within Saxony-Anhalt
- Coordinates: 51°58′N 11°39′E
- Country: Germany
- State: Saxony-Anhalt
- District: Salzlandkreis

Government
  - Mayor (2022–29): Marco Schmoldt (SPD)

Area
  - Total: 91.97 km^{2} (35.51 sq mi)

Population (2025-12-31)
  - Total: 7,348
  - Density: 79.90/km^{2} (206.9/sq mi)
- Time zone: UTC+01:00 (CET)
  - Summer (DST): UTC+02:00 (CEST)
- Postal codes: 39221
- Vehicle registration: SLK
- Website: www.gem-boerdeland.de

Bördeland is a municipality in the district Salzlandkreis, in Saxony-Anhalt, Germany. It is situated south-west of Schönebeck.

== History ==
The municipality was formed on 29 December 2007 from the former municipalities Biere, Eggersdorf, Eickendorf, Großmühlingen, Kleinmühlingen, Welsleben and Zens. Between January 2005 and January 2008, these municipalities cooperated in the Verwaltungsgemeinschaft ("collective municipality") Südöstliches Bördeland.

== Subdivision ==
Ortsteil	Inhabitants
Biere	2,431
Eggersdorf	1,240
Eickendorf	1,143
Großmühlingen	1,059

Ortsteil	Inhabitants
Kleinmühlingen	640
Welsleben	1,835
Zens	288
