= Loess =

Sediment of accumulated wind-blown dust

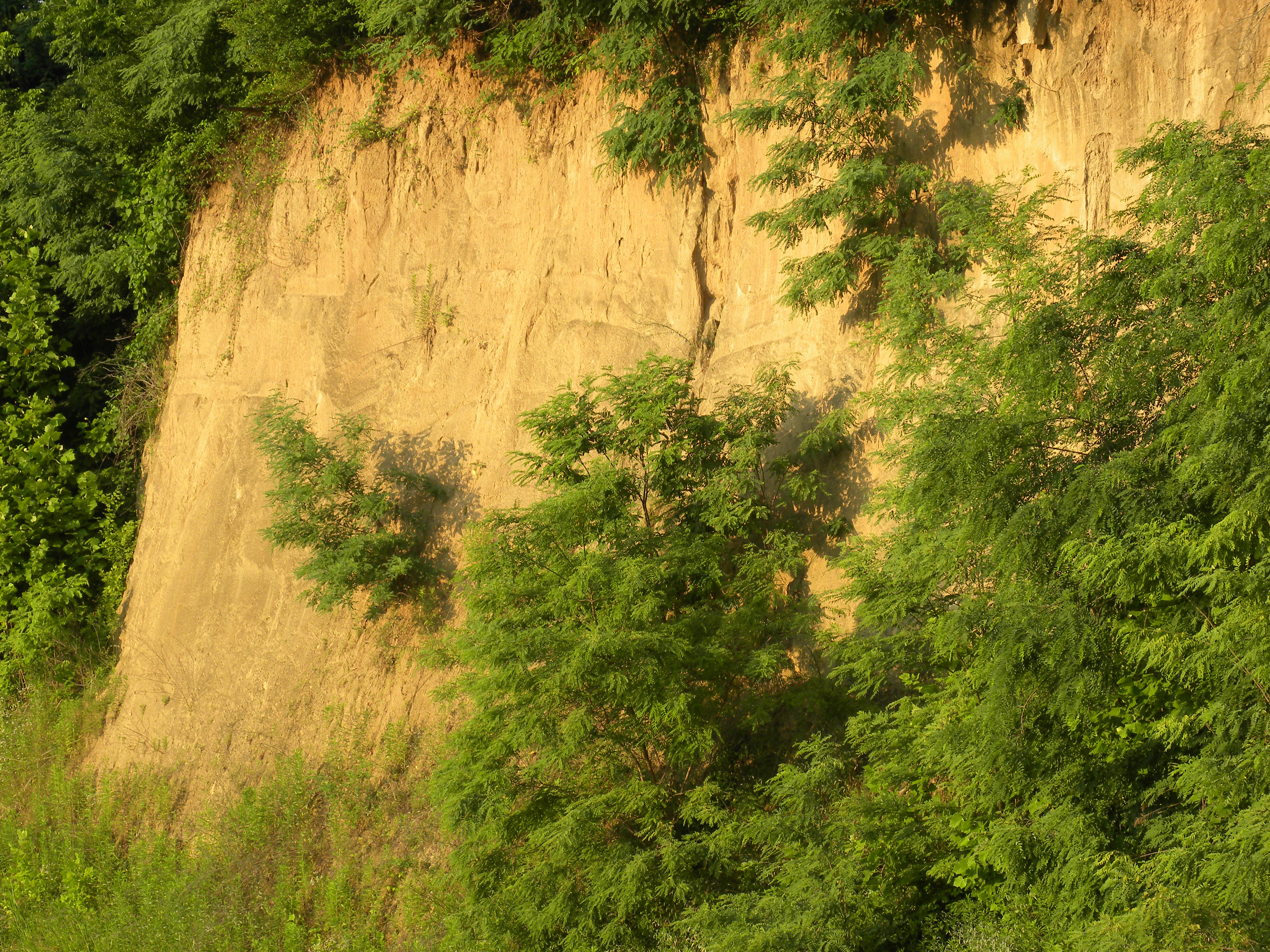
Loess in Vicksburg, Mississippi, United States

Loess (US: /ˈlɛs, ˈlʌs, ˈloʊ.əs/, UK: /ˈloʊ.əs, ˈlɜːs/; from German: Löss [lœs]) is a clastic, predominantly silt-sized sediment that is formed by the accumulation of wind-blown dust. Ten percent of Earth's land area is covered by loesses or similar deposits.

Loess is a periglacial or aeolian (windborne) sediment, defined as an accumulation of 20% or less of clay with a balance of roughly equal parts sand and silt (with a typical grain size from 20 to 50 micrometers), often loosely cemented by calcium carbonate. Usually, they are homogeneous and highly porous and have vertical capillaries that permit the sediment to fracture and form vertical bluffs.

== Properties ==
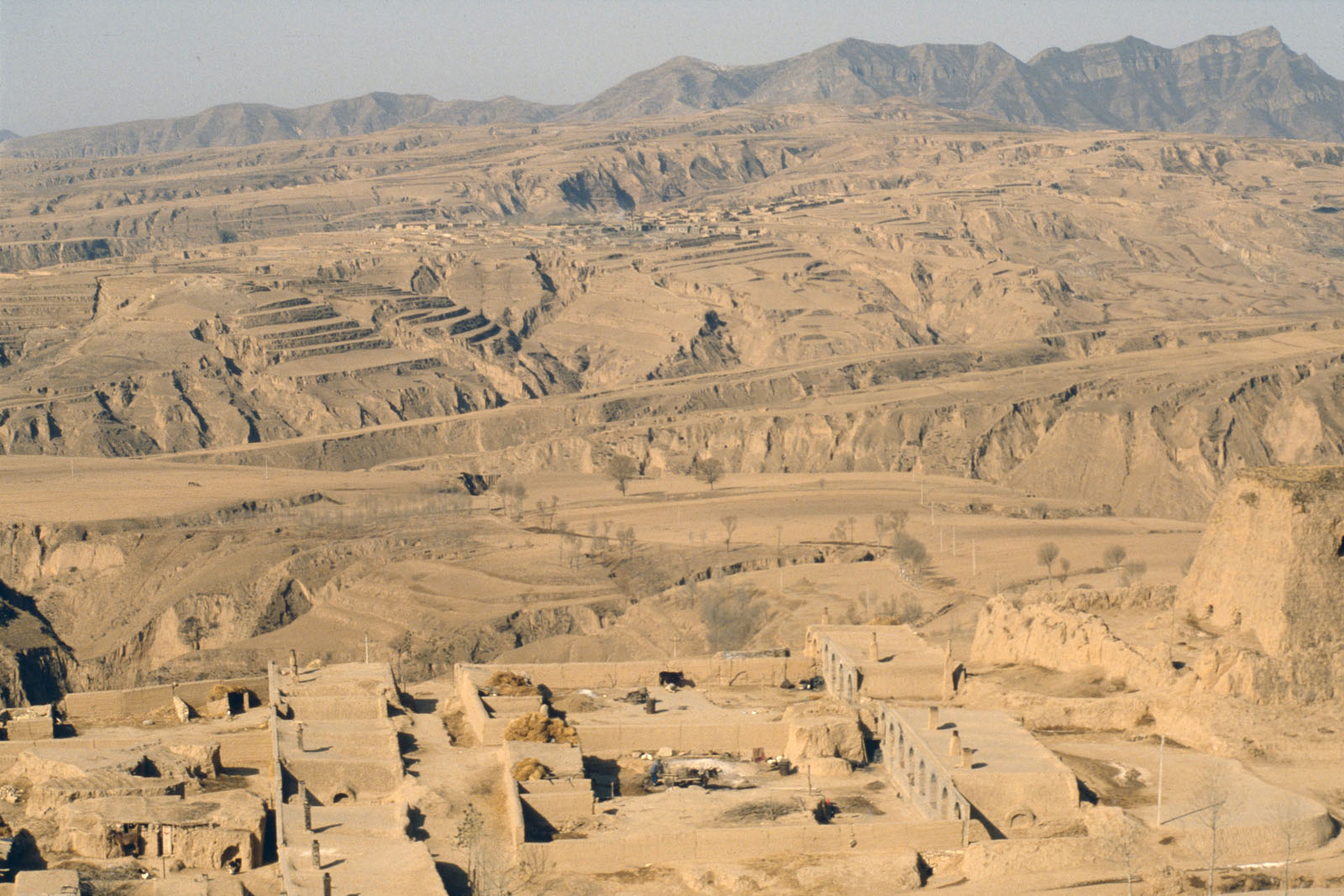
Loess near Hunyuan, China

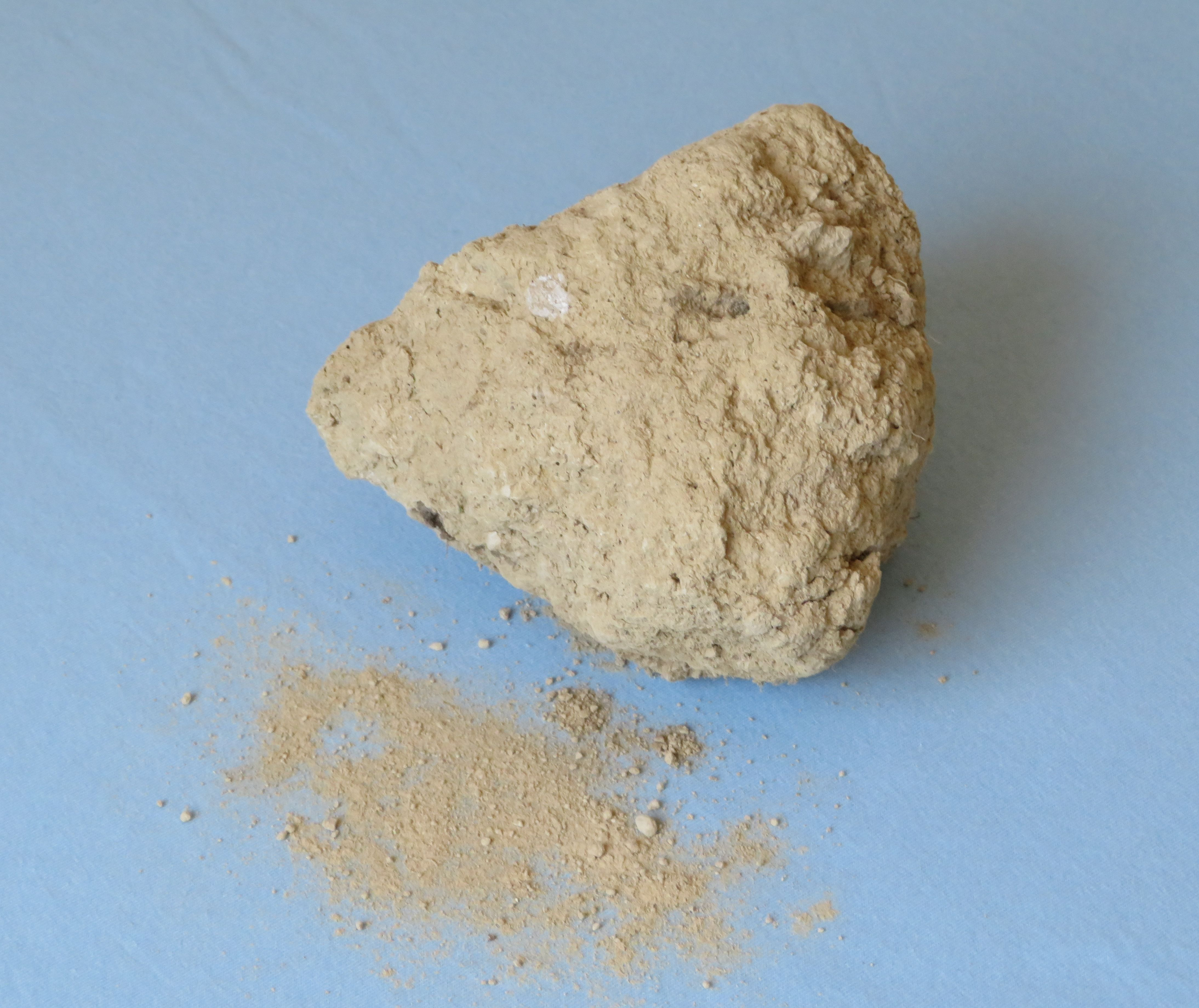
Loess from the Rhine lowlands near Mannheim with calcareous concretions

Loesses are homogeneous, erosive, porous, friable, pale yellow or buff, slightly coherent, typically non-stratified, and often calcareous. Loess grains are angular, with little polishing or rounding, and composed of quartz, feldspar, mica, or other mineral crystals. Loesses have been described as rich, dust-like soil.

Loess deposits may become very thick: at more than a hundred meters in areas of Northwestern China and tens of meters in parts of the Midwestern United States. Loesses generally occur as blanket deposits that cover hundreds of square kilometers. Loesses often have steep or vertical faces. Because the grains are angular, loesses will often stand in banks for many years without slumping. This type of soil has "vertical cleavage", and thus, it can be easily excavated to form cave dwellings, which is a popular method of making human habitations in some parts of China. However, loesses can readily erode.

In several areas of the world, loess ridges have formed that had been aligned with the prevailing winds during the last glacial maximum; these are called "paha ridges" in America and "greda ridges" in Europe. The formation of these loess dunes has been explained as a combination of wind and tundra conditions.

== Etymology ==
The word loess, with connotations of origin by wind-deposited accumulation, was introduced into English from the German Löss (1824), which can be traced back to Swiss German and is cognate with the English word loose and the German word los. It was first applied to the Rhine River valley loesses around 1821.

== History of research ==
The term "Löß" was first described in Central Europe by Karl Cäsar von Leonhard (1823–1824), who had reported yellowish brown, silty deposits along the Rhine valley near Heidelberg. Charles Lyell (1834) brought the term into widespread usage, observing similarities between "loess" and its derivatives along the loess bluffs in the Rhine and in Mississippi. At the time, it was thought that the yellowish brown silt-rich sediment was of fluvial origin and had been deposited by large rivers. The aeolian origin of the loesses was recognized later (Virlet D'Aoust 1857), particularly due to the convincing observations of loesses in China by Ferdinand von Richthofen (1878). Many scientific papers have been published since then, focusing on the formation of loesses and on loess/paleosol (older soil buried under deposits) sequences as the archives of climate and environment change. Research on loesses in China to support water conservation has been ongoing since 1954.

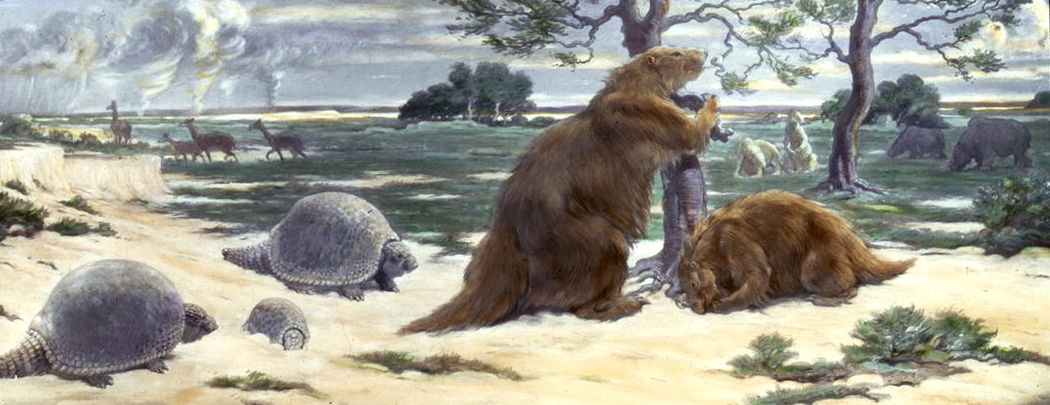
Artist's impression of a scene during the Pleistocene Era. A dust storm in the distance represents a typical cause of present-day loess. (1918 painting by Charles R. Knight)

Much effort was put into setting up regional and local loess stratigraphies and their correlations (Kukla 1970, 1975, 1977). However, even the chronostratigraphical position of the last interglacial soil correlating with marine isotope substage 5e was a matter of debate, due to the lack of robust and reliable numerical dating, as summarized, for example, by Zöller et al. (1994) and Frechen et al. (1997) for the Austrian and Hungarian loess stratigraphy, respectively.

Since the 1980s, thermoluminescence (TL), optically stimulated luminescence (OSL), and infrared stimulated luminescence (IRSL) dating have been available, providing the possibility for dating the time of loess (dust) depositions, i.e., the time elapsed since the last exposure of the mineral grains to daylight. During the past decade, luminescence dating has significantly improved by new methodological improvements, especially the development of single aliquot regenerative (SAR) protocols (Murray & Wintle 2000) resulting in reliable ages (or age estimates) with an accuracy of up to 5 and 10% for the last glacial record. More recently, luminescence dating has also become a robust dating technique for penultimate and antepenultimate glacial loess (e.g. Thiel et al. 2011, Schmidt et al. 2011) allowing for a reliable correlation of loess/palaeosol sequences for at least the last two interglacial/glacial cycles throughout Europe and the Northern Hemisphere (Frechen 2011). Furthermore, the numerical dating provides the basis for quantitative loess research applying more sophisticated methods to determine and understand high-resolution proxy data including the palaeodust content of the atmosphere, variations of the atmospheric circulation patterns and wind systems, palaeoprecipitation, and palaeotemperature.

Besides luminescence dating methods, the use of radiocarbon dating in loess has increased during the past decades. Advances in methods of analyses, instrumentation, and refinements to the radiocarbon calibration curve have made it possible to obtain reliable ages from loess deposits for the last 40–45 ka. However, the use of this method relies on finding suitable in situ organic material in deposits such as charcoal, seeds, earthworm granules, or snail shells.

== Formation ==
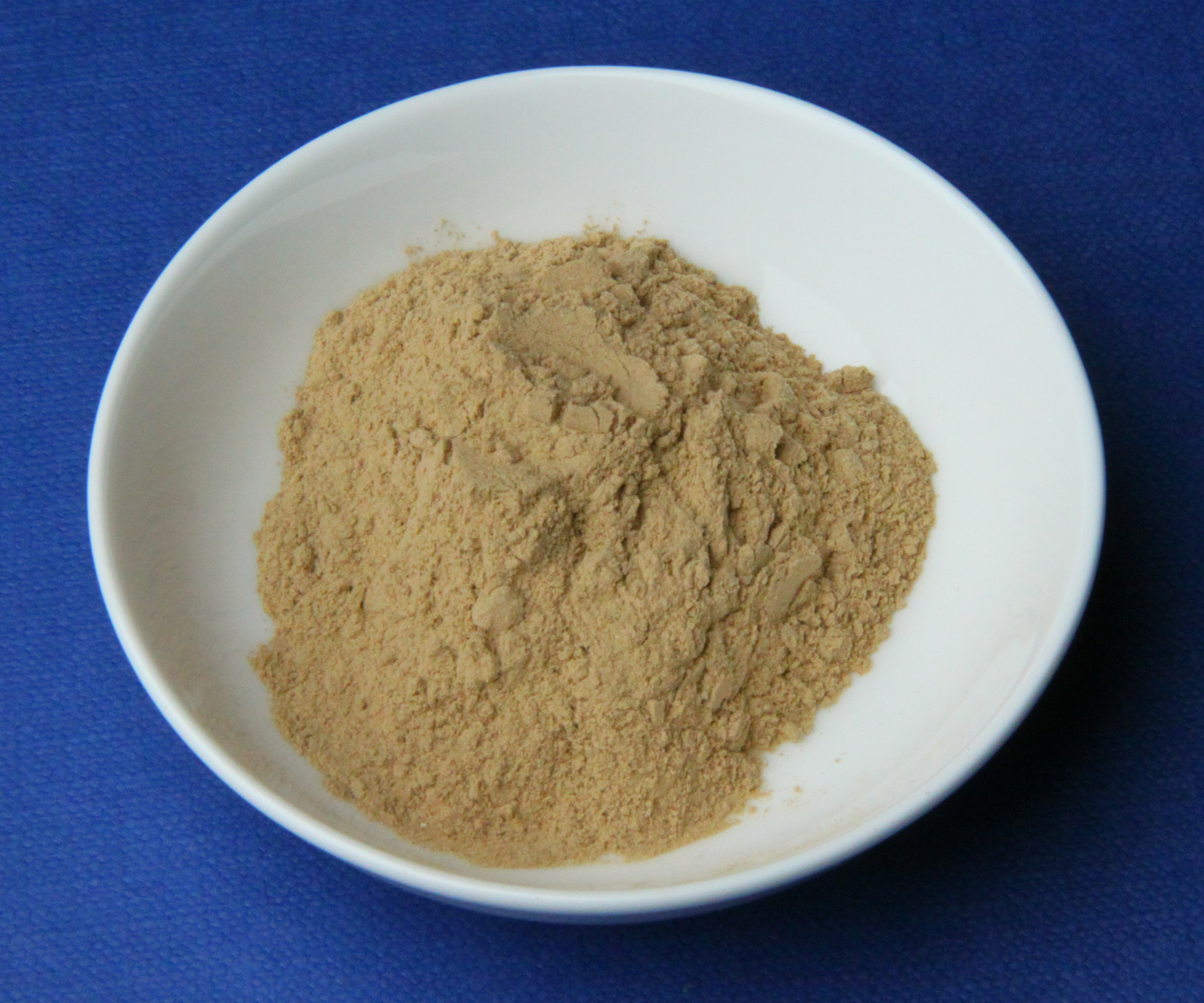
Medicinal clay composed of loess with a fineness grade of 1

According to Pye (1995), four fundamental requirements are necessary for the formation of loess: a dust source, adequate wind energy to transport the dust, a suitable accumulation area, and a sufficient amount of time.

=== Periglacial loess ===
Periglacial (glacial) loess is derived from the floodplains of glacial braided rivers that carried large volumes of glacial meltwater and sediments from the annual melting of continental ice sheets and mountain ice caps during the spring and summer. During the autumn and winter, when the melting of the ice sheets and ice caps ceased, the flow of meltwater down these rivers either ceased or was greatly reduced. As a consequence, large parts of the formerly submerged and unvegetated floodplains of these braided rivers dried out and were exposed to the wind. Because the floodplains consist of sediment containing a high content of glacially ground flour-like silt and clay, they were highly susceptible to winnowing of their silts and clays by the wind. Once entrained by the wind, particles were then deposited downwind. The loess deposits found along both sides of the Mississippi River alluvial valley are a classic example of periglacial loess.

During the Quaternary, loess and loess-like sediments were formed in periglacial environments on mid-continental shield areas in Europe and Siberia as well as on the margins of high mountain ranges like in Tajikistan and on semi-arid margins of some lowland deserts as in China.

In England, periglacial loess is also known as brickearth.

=== Non-glacial ===
Non-glacial loess can originate from deserts, dune fields, playa lakes, and volcanic ash.

Some types of nonglacial loess are:

- Desert loess produced by aeolian attrition of quartz grains;
- Volcanic loess in Ecuador and Argentina;
- Tropical loess in Argentina, Brazil and Uruguay;
- Gypsum loess in Spain;
- Trade wind loess in Venezuela and Brazil;
- Anticyclonic loess in Argentina.

The thick Chinese loess deposits are non-glacial loess having been blown in from deserts in northern China. The loess covering the Great Plains of Nebraska, Kansas, and Colorado is considered to be non-glacial desert loess. Non-glacial desert loess is also found in Australia and Africa.

== Fertility ==
Loess tends to develop into very rich soils. Under appropriate climatic conditions, it is some of the most agriculturally productive terrain in the world.

Soils underlain by loess tend to be excessively drained. The fine grains weather rapidly due to their large surface area, making soils derived from loess rich. The fertility of loess soils is due largely to a high cation exchange capacity (the ability of the soil to retain nutrients) and porosity (the air-filled space in the soil). The fertility of loess is not due to organic matter content, which tends to be rather low, unlike tropical soils which derive their fertility almost wholly from organic matter.

Even well managed loess farmland can experience dramatic erosion of well over 2.5 kg/m^{2} per year. In China, the loess deposits which give the Yellow River its color have been farmed and have produced phenomenal yields for over one thousand years. Winds pick up loess particles contributing to the Asian Dust pollution problem. The largest deposit of loess in the United States which is the Loess Hills along the border of Iowa and Nebraska, has survived intensive farming and poor farming practices. For almost 150 years, this loess deposit was farmed with mouldboard ploughs and tilled in the fall, both intensely erosive practices. At times it suffered erosion rates of over 10 kilograms per square meter per year. Today this loess deposit is worked as low till or no till in all areas and is aggressively terraced.

== Large areas of loess deposits and soils ==
=== Central Asia ===
An area of multiple loess deposits spans from southern Tajikistan up to Almaty, Kazakhstan.

=== East Asia ===
==== China ====
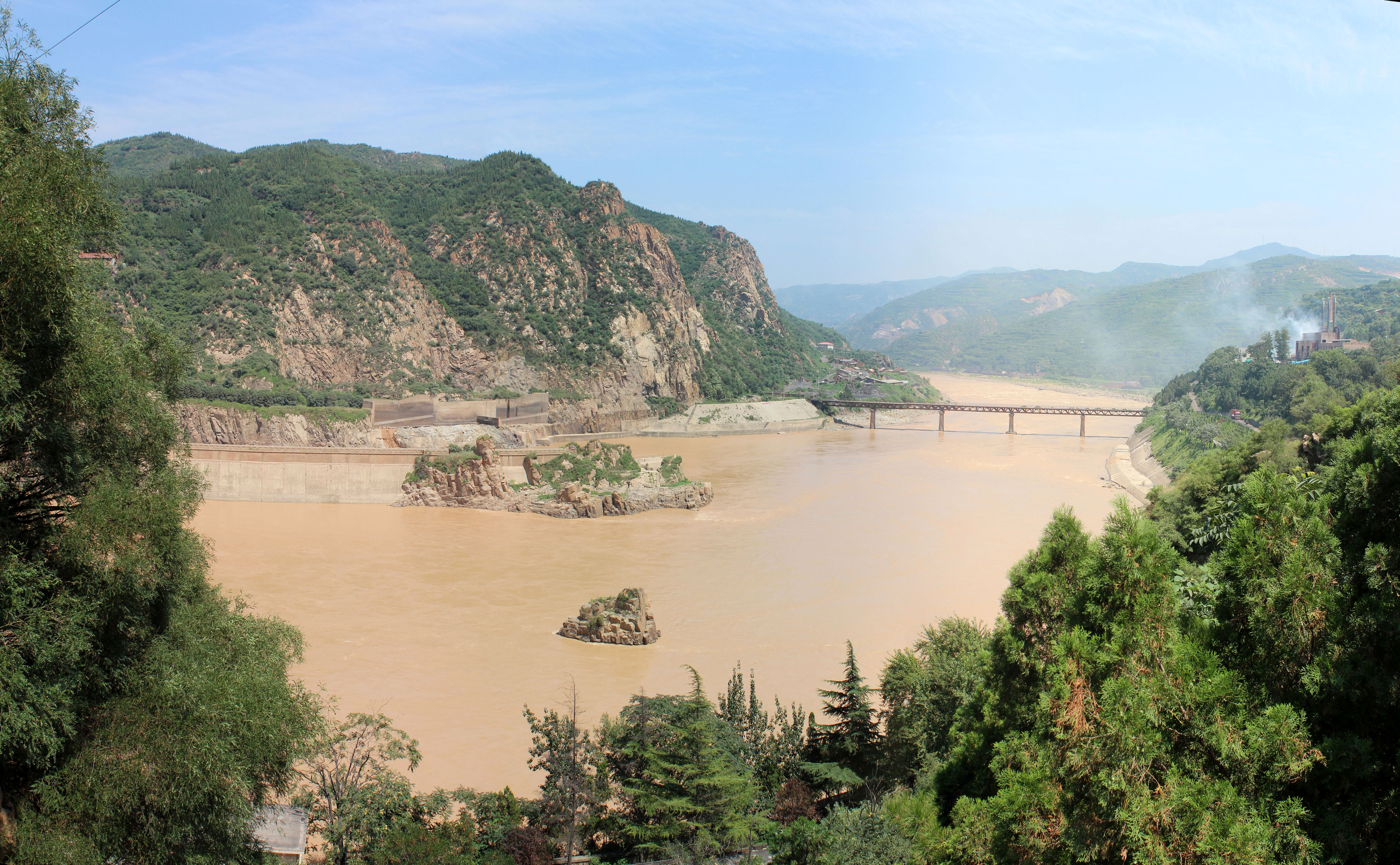
The Yellow River's distinctive light yellow colour is due to the large amounts of loess it carries from the Loess Plateau.

The Loess Plateau (simplified Chinese: 黄土高原; traditional Chinese: 黃土高原; pinyin: Huángtǔ Gāoyuán), also known as the Huangtu Plateau, is a plateau that covers an area of some 640,000 km^{2} around the upper and middle reaches of China's Yellow River. The Yellow River was so named because the loess forming its banks gave a yellowish tint to the water. The soil of this region has been called the "most highly erodible soil on earth". The Loess Plateau and its dusty soil cover almost all of Shanxi, Shaanxi, and Gansu provinces; the Ningxia Hui Autonomous Region, and parts of others.

=== Europe ===
Loess canyon near Bochotnica, Poland

Loess deposits of varying thickness (decimeter to several tens of meters) are widely distributed over the European continent. The northern European loess belt stretches from southern England and northern France to Germany, Poland and the southern Ukraine and deposits are characterized by strong influences of periglacial conditions. South-eastern European loess is mainly deposited in plateau-like situations in the Danube basins, likely derived from the Danube River system. In south-western Europe, relocated loess derivatives are mostly restricted to the Ebro Valley and central Spain.

=== North America ===
==== United States ====
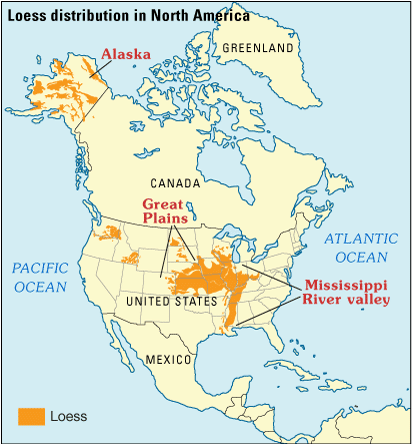
Map showing the distribution of loess in the United States

The Loess Hills of Iowa owe their fertility to the prairie topsoils built by 10,000 years of post-glacial accumulation of organic-rich humus as a consequence of a persistent grassland biome. When the valuable A-horizon topsoil is eroded or degraded, the underlying loess soil is infertile and requires the addition of fertilizer to support agriculture.

The loess along the Mississippi River near Vicksburg, Mississippi, consists of three layers. The Peoria Loess, Sicily Island Loess, and Crowley's Ridge Loess accumulated at different periods during the Pleistocene. Ancient soils, called paleosols, have developed on the top of the Sicily Island Loess and Crowley's Ridge Loess. The lowermost loess, the Crowley's Ridge Loess, accumulated during the late Illinoian Stage. The middle loess, Sicily Island Loess, accumulated during the early Wisconsin Stage. The uppermost loess, the Peoria Loess, in which the modern soil has developed, accumulated during the late Wisconsin Stage. Animal remains include terrestrial gastropods and mastodons.

=== Oceania ===
==== New Zealand ====
Extensive areas of loess occur in New Zealand including the Canterbury Plains and on the Banks Peninsula. The basis of loess stratigraphy was introduced by John Hardcastle in 1890.

=== South America ===
==== Argentina ====
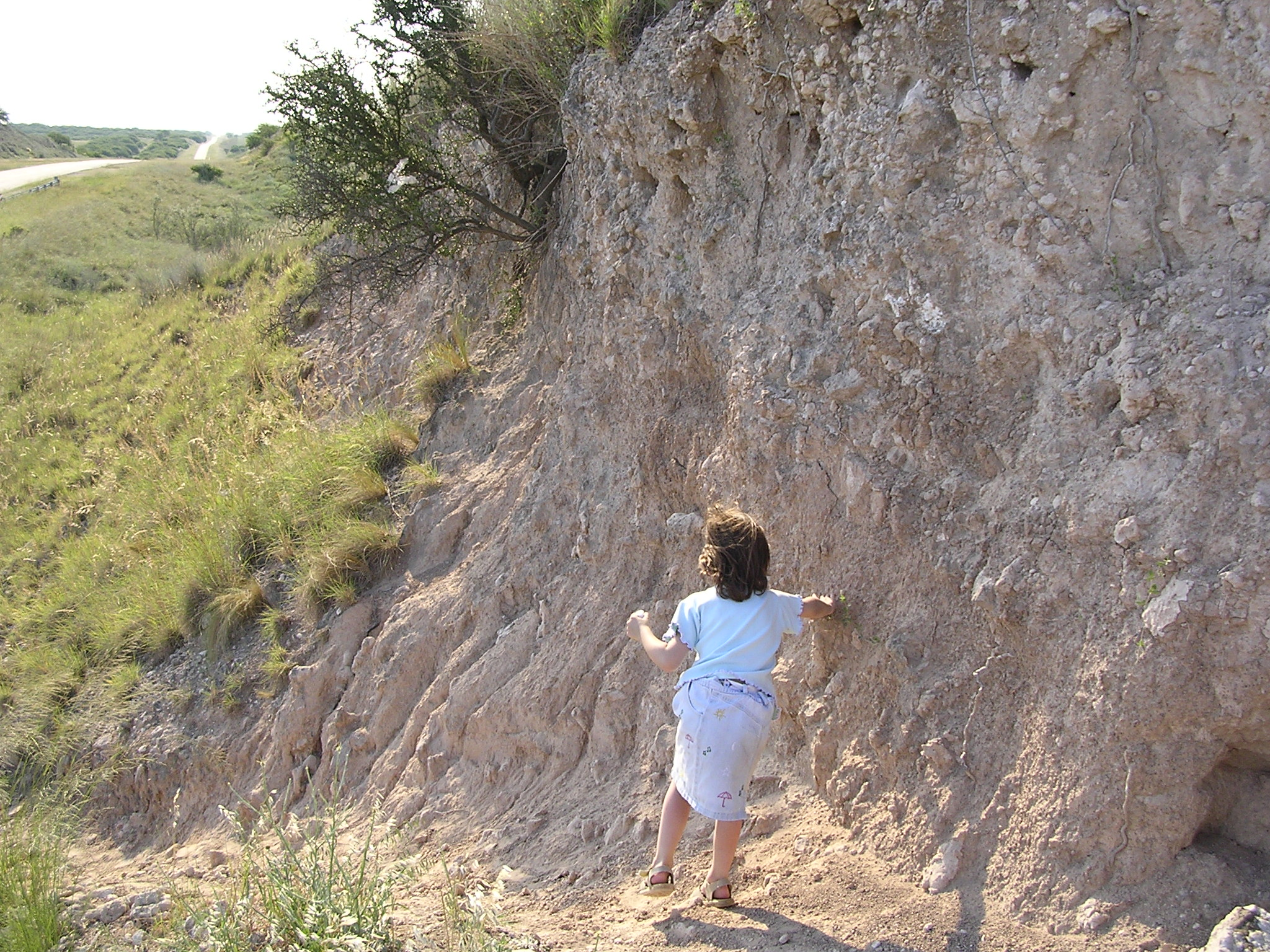
An outcrop of loess in Patagonia

Much of Argentina is covered by loess. Two areas of loess are usually distinguished in Argentina: the neotropical loess north of latitude 30° S and the pampean loess.

The neotropical loess is made of silt or silty clay. Relative to the pampean loess the neotropical loess is poor in quartz and calcium carbonate. The source region for this loess is thought by some scientists to be areas of fluvio-glacial deposits the Andean foothills formed by the Patagonian Ice Sheet. Other researchers stress the importance of volcanic material in the neotropical loess.

The pampean loess is sandy or made of silty sand.

== See also ==
- Börde – Fertile plain – North German loess regions
- Gäu – South German loess regions
- Loam – Soil composed of similar proportions of sand and silt, and somewhat less clay
