= Bundesstraße 245 =

Federal highway in Germany

B 245
- Bundesstraße 245

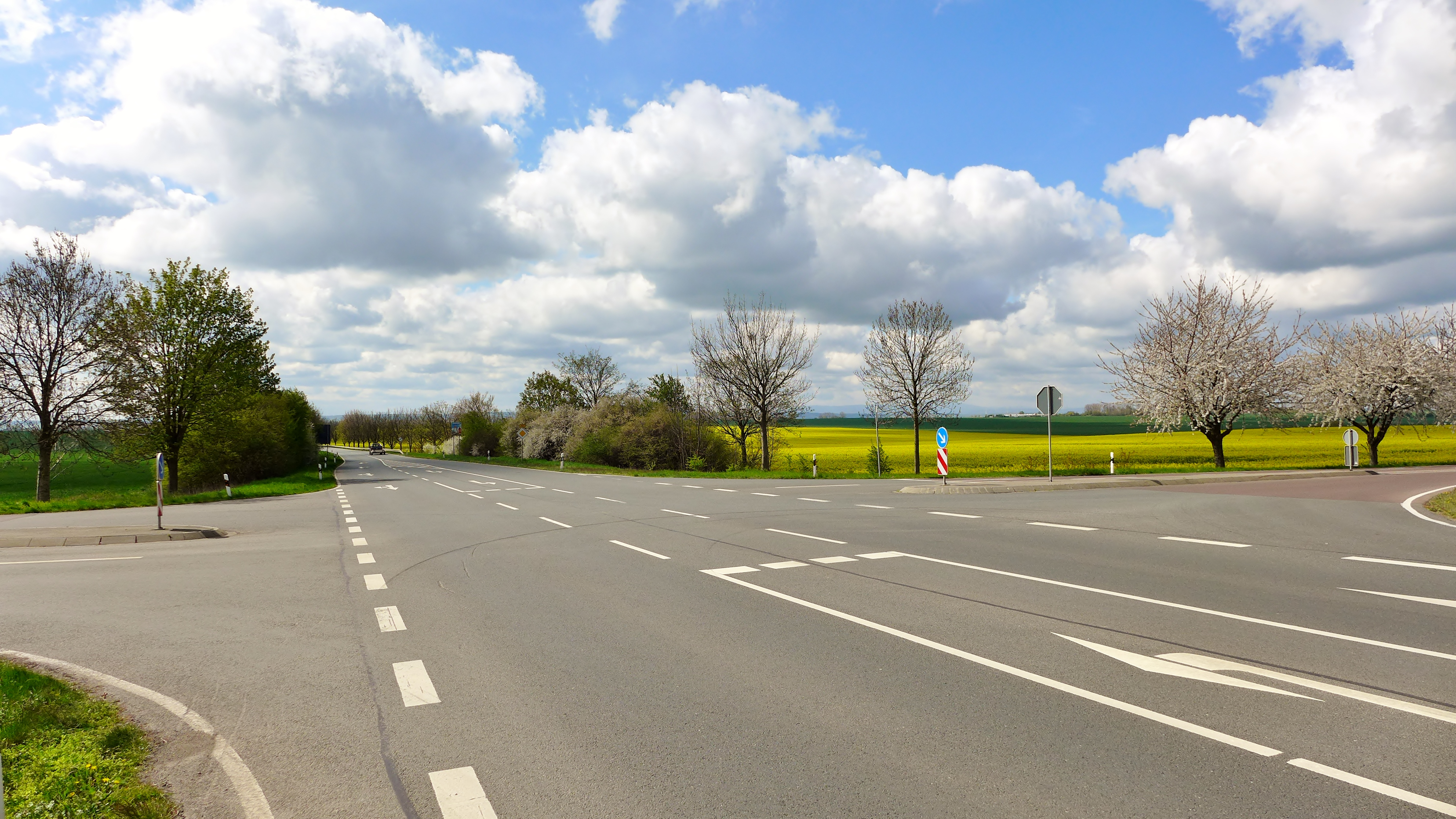

Route information
- Length: 61 km (38 mi)

Major junctions
- North end: Haldensleben
- B 71
- South end: Halberstadt

Location
- Country: Germany
- States: Saxony-Anhalt

Highway system
- Roads in Germany; Autobahns; List; Federal; List; State; E-roads

The Bundesstraße 245 (abbreviated B 245) is a German federal highway in Saxony-Anhalt. It runs from Haldensleben in Börde to Halberstadt in Harz.

== Junctions lists ==
Legend:

- I/C - Interchange, I/S - Intersection, RSA - Rest and service area, OBR - Overhead bridge restaurant, R/R - Restaurant and rest plaza, L/B - Layby, V/P - Vista point, TN - tunnel, T/P - Toll plaza, BR - Bridge

km	Exit	Name
		Haldensleben B 71
		Bebertal
Crossing		B 1
		Uhrsleben
	(65)	Eilsleben A 2
		Hakenstedt B 246a
		Eilsleben
		Ummendorf
		Völpke
		Barneberg B 245a
		Hamersleben
		Neuwegersleben B 246
		Schwanebeck
		Groß Quenstedt
		Halberstadt B 81

== See also ==
- List of federal highways in Germany
