= Benndorf (disambiguation) =

Benndorf is municipality in the Mansfeld-Südharz district.

Benndorf may also refer to:

- in Saxony-Anhalt, Germany:
  - Benndorf (Kabelsketal), district of Kabelsketal, Saalekreis district
  - Benndorf (Lanitz-Hassel-Tal), district of Lanitz-Hassel-Tal, Burgenlandkreis district
  - Benndorf (Braunsbedra), the brown coal mining disappeared district of Braunsbedra, Saalekreis district
  - Benndorf, Bendorf, lost place between Laucha and Weischütz, Burgenlandkreis district
- in Saxony, Germany:
  - Benndorf (Delitzsch), district of Delitzsch, Landkreis Nordsachsen district
  - Benndorf (Frohburg), district of Frohburg, Landkreis Leipzig district

Benndorf is the family name of several people.

- a noble family "von Benndorf"
- Cornelie Benndorf-Much (1880–1962), Austrian anglistin, gymnastics teacher and high school director
- Hans Benndorf (1870–1953), Austrian physicist
- Helene Benndorf (1897–1984), German librarian
- Karl-Heinz Benndorf (1919–1995), German painter and sculptor
- Michael Benndorf (born 1952), President of the Higher Administrative Court of Saxony-Anhalt in Magdeburg
- Otto Benndorf (1838–1907), German archaeologist
- Paul Benndorf (1859–1926), German teacher and writer
- Wolfgang Benndorf (1901–1959), Austrian director of the university library Graz

== See also ==
- Bendorf, Beendorf
- Behnsdorf, Bensdorf
