= Flechtingen Hills =

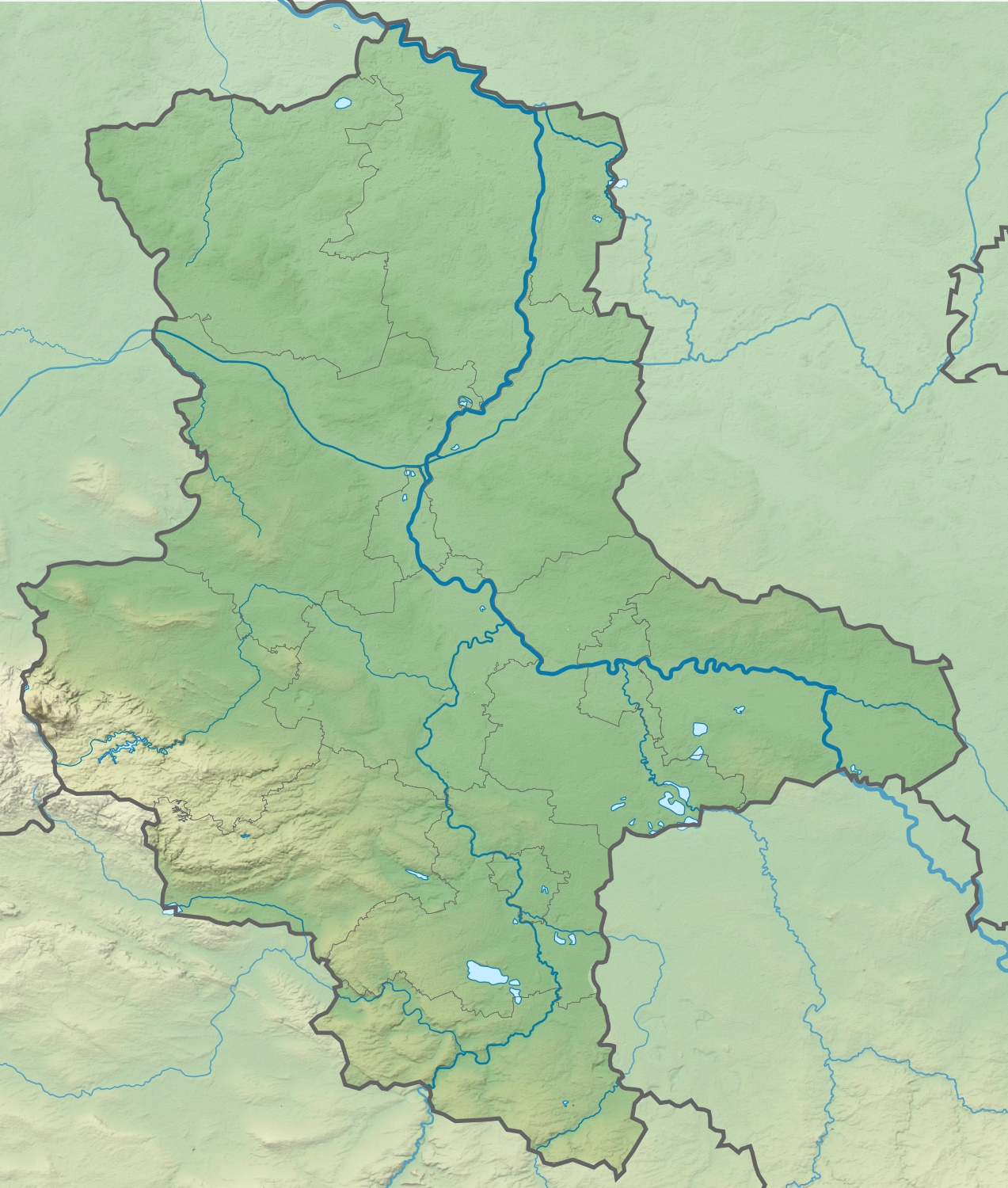
- Location within Saxony-Anhalt

Highest point
- Elevation: 179 m (587 ft)
- Coordinates: 52°17′N 11°13′E

Geography
- Location: Saxony-Anhalt, Germany

The Flechtingen Hills (German: Flechtinger Höhenzug) are a wooded, hilly upland area up to 179 m high in the northwestern part of the German state of Saxony-Anhalt, named after the town of Flechtingen.

== Location ==
The Flechtingen Hills are bordered by the River Aller to the west, the Spetze, a right-hand tributary of the Aller, to the north, the valley of the Ohre to the northeast, through which the Mittelland Canal also runs, and by the Beber, a tributary of the Ohre, to the south.

One of the highest elevations in the Flechtingen Hills is the Butterberg near Ivenrode at 176 m above sea level (NN).

== Geology ==
Unlike the surrounding region, geologically old rocks reach the surface of the Flechtingen Hills. It thus forms the northernmost region of bedrock in Germany, because North Germany is almost completely covered by unconsolidated rocks of the Quaternary period. The ridge is mostly composed of volcanic rock and sedimentary rocks of the Carboniferous and Permian periods. In places these are mined in large quarries.

Regionally the ridge is part of the Flechtingen-Roßlau Scholle, that runs in the northwest from the depression of the Drömling towards the southeast to Magdeburg and the river Roßlau. Another well-known ridge in this Scholle is the Magdeburg Domfelsen, which acts as a sill to the Elbe and markedly raises its water velocity.
