= Böddensell =

- Ortsteil of Flechtingen
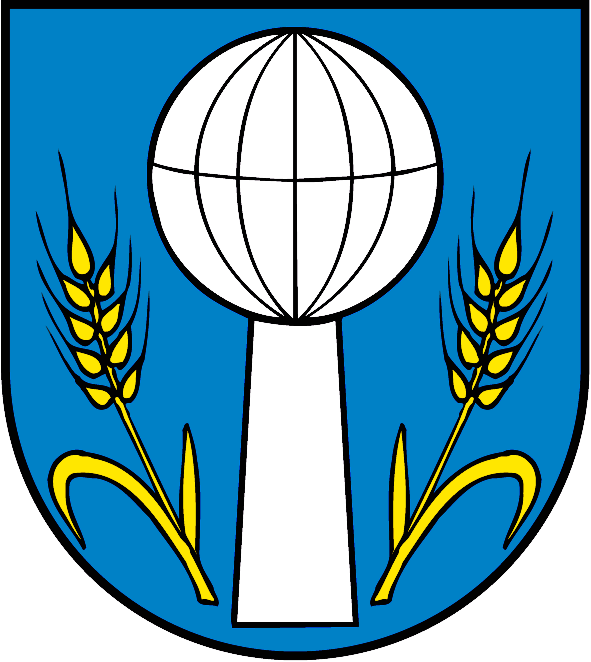
- Coat of arms
- Interactive map of Böddensell
- Location within Germany Location within Saxony-Anhalt
- Coordinates: 52°22′N 11°14′E
- Country: Germany
- State: Saxony-Anhalt
- District: Börde
- Municipality: Flechtingen

Area
  - Total: 6.99 km^{2} (2.70 sq mi)
- Elevation: 82 m (269 ft)

Population (2006-12-31)
  - Total: 243
  - Density: 34.8/km^{2} (90.0/sq mi)
- Time zone: UTC+01:00 (CET)
  - Summer (DST): UTC+02:00 (CEST)
- Postal codes: 39359
- Dialling codes: 039054
- Vehicle registration: BK

Böddensell is a village and a former municipality in the Börde district in Saxony-Anhalt, Germany.

Since 1 January 2010, it is part of the municipality Flechtingen.
