= Heinrichsberg =

- Ortsteil of Loitsche-Heinrichsberg
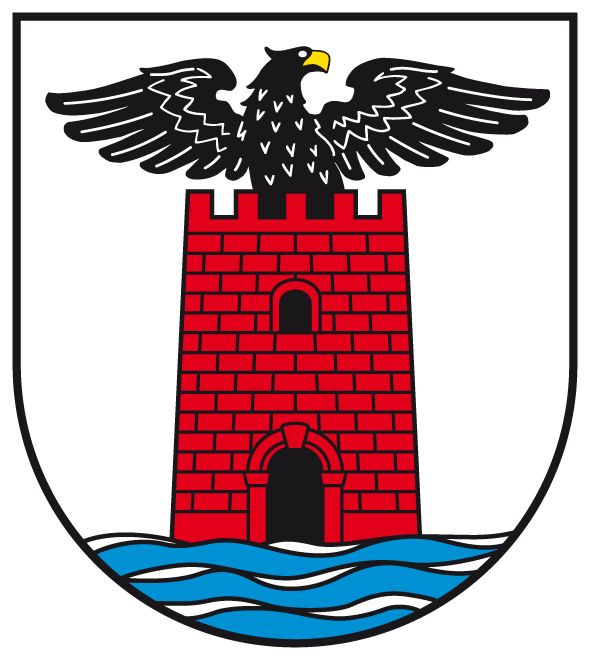
- Coat of arms

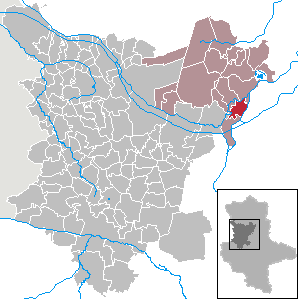
- Location of Heinrichsberg within Börde district
- Interactive map of Heinrichsberg
- Location within Germany Location within Saxony-Anhalt
- Coordinates: 52°16′23.002″N 11°44′3.001″E
- Country: Germany
- State: Saxony-Anhalt
- District: Börde
- Municipality: Loitsche-Heinrichsberg

Area
  - Total: 11.34 km^{2} (4.38 sq mi)
- Elevation: 40 m (130 ft)

Population (2006-12-31)
  - Total: 381
  - Density: 33.6/km^{2} (87.0/sq mi)
- Time zone: UTC+01:00 (CET)
  - Summer (DST): UTC+02:00 (CEST)
- Postal codes: 39326
- Dialling codes: 039208
- Vehicle registration: OK
- Website: www.elbe-heide.de

Heinrichsberg is a village and a former municipality in the Börde district in Saxony-Anhalt, Germany. Since 1 January 2010, it is part of the municipality Loitsche-Heinrichsberg.
