= Vatke =

Vatke is a surname. Notable people with the surname include:

- Georg Carl Wilhelm Vatke (1849–1889), German botanist to whom the botanical abbreviation Vatke refers.
- (Johann Karl) Wilhelm Vatke (1806–1882), German theologian.
