= Bartensleben =

- Ortsteil of Erxleben
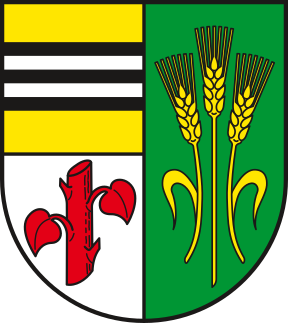
- Coat of arms
- Interactive map of Bartensleben
- Location within Germany Location within Saxony-Anhalt
- Coordinates: 52°14′N 11°8′E
- Country: Germany
- State: Saxony-Anhalt
- District: Börde
- Municipality: Erxleben

Area
  - Total: 16.41 km^{2} (6.34 sq mi)
- Elevation: 151 m (495 ft)

Population (2006-12-31)
  - Total: 344
  - Density: 21.0/km^{2} (54.3/sq mi)
- Time zone: UTC+01:00 (CET)
  - Summer (DST): UTC+02:00 (CEST)
- Postal codes: 39343
- Dialling codes: 039050
- Vehicle registration: BK

Bartensleben is a village and a former municipality in the Börde district in Saxony-Anhalt, Germany. Since 1 January 2010, it is part of the municipality Erxleben. It is mostly known because of the former Repository for radioactive waste Morsleben nearby. The disposal of waste into the facility was ended in 1998.
