= Neuenhofe =

- Ortsteil of Westheide
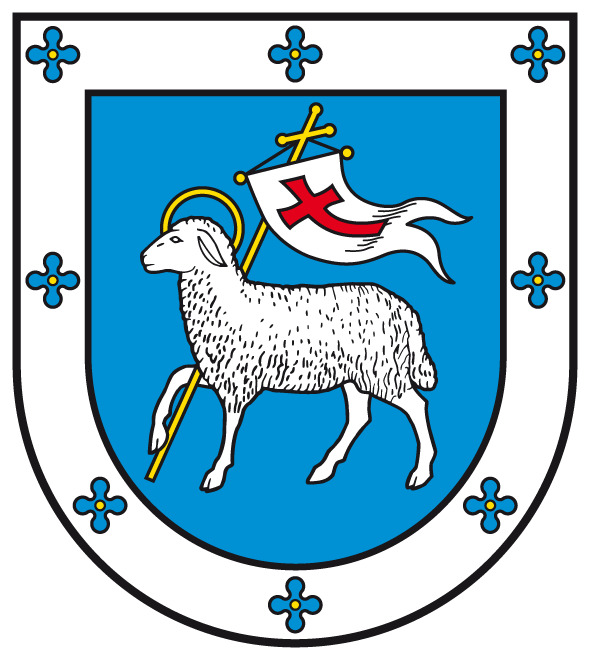
- Coat of arms

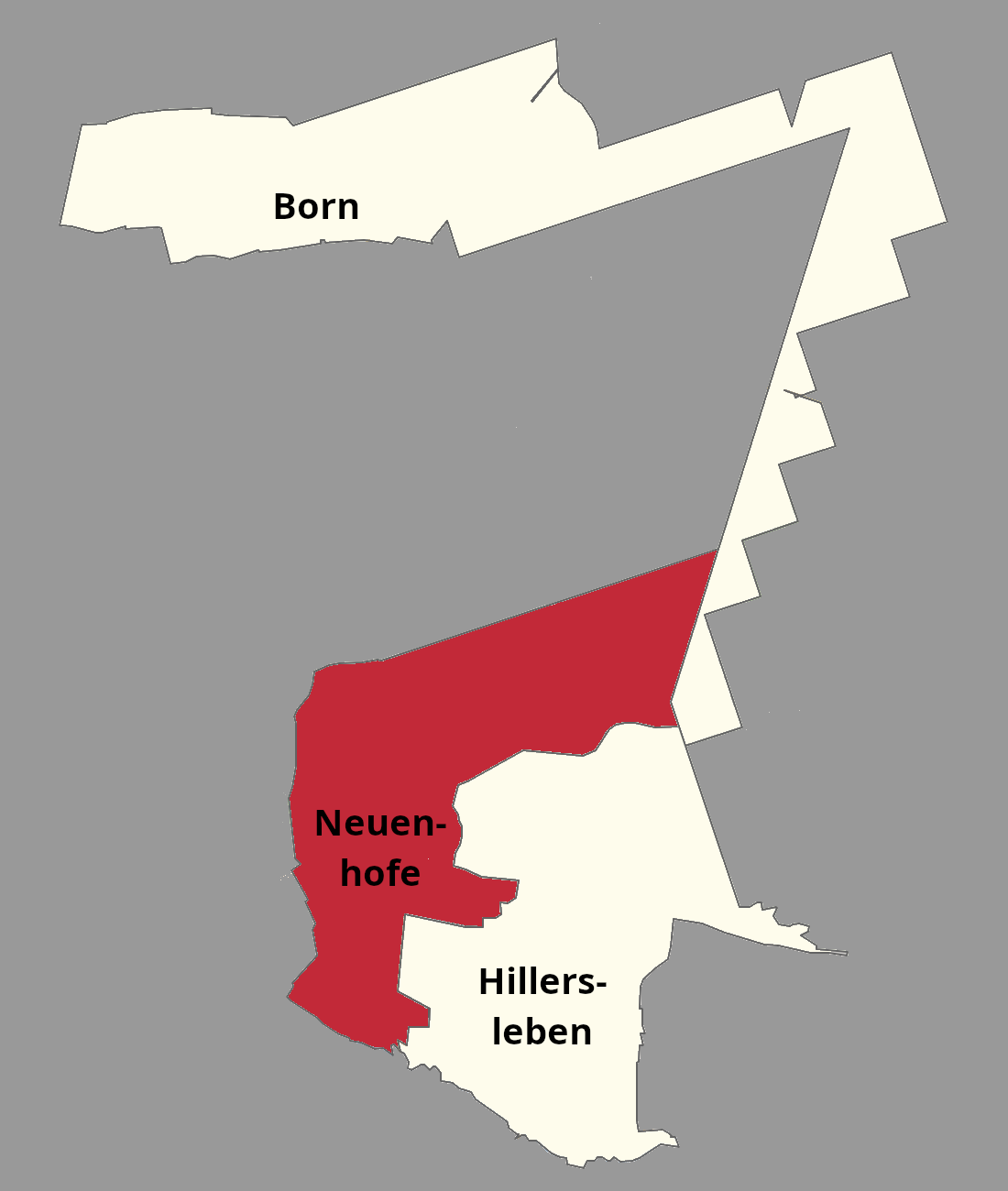
- Neuenhofe in Westheide
- Interactive map of Neuenhofe
- Location within Germany Location within Saxony-Anhalt
- Coordinates: 52°18′N 11°28′E
- Country: Germany
- State: Saxony-Anhalt
- District: Börde
- Municipality: Westheide

Area
  - Total: 14.97 km^{2} (5.78 sq mi)
- Elevation: 74 m (243 ft)

Population (2006-12-31)
  - Total: 774
  - Density: 51.7/km^{2} (134/sq mi)
- Time zone: UTC+01:00 (CET)
  - Summer (DST): UTC+02:00 (CEST)
- Postal codes: 39345
- Dialling codes: 03904
- Website: www.elbe-heide.de

Neuenhofe is a village and a former municipality in the Börde district in Saxony-Anhalt, Germany. Since 1 January 2010, it is part of the municipality Westheide.
