= Druxberge =

- Ortsteil of Eilsleben
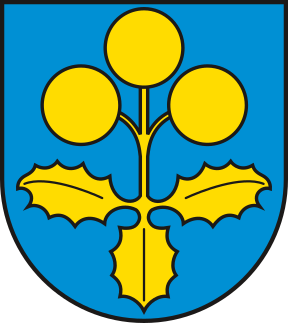
- Coat of arms
- Interactive map of Druxberge
- Location within Germany Location within Saxony-Anhalt
- Coordinates: 52°8′N 11°19′E
- Country: Germany
- State: Saxony-Anhalt
- District: Börde
- Municipality: Eilsleben

Area
  - Total: 7.46 km^{2} (2.88 sq mi)
- Elevation: 150 m (490 ft)

Population (2009-12-31)
  - Total: 408
  - Density: 54.7/km^{2} (142/sq mi)
- Time zone: UTC+01:00 (CET)
  - Summer (DST): UTC+02:00 (CEST)
- Postal codes: 39365
- Dialling codes: 039293
- Vehicle registration: BK
- Website: www.allerquelle.de

Druxberge is a village and a former municipality in the Börde district in Saxony-Anhalt, Germany. Since 1 September 2010, it is part of the municipality Eilsleben.
