= Ovelgünne =

- Ortsteil of Eilsleben
- Interactive map of Ovelgünne
- Location within Germany Location within Saxony-Anhalt
- Coordinates: 52°8′42″N 11°16′0″E
- Country: Germany
- State: Saxony-Anhalt
- District: Börde
- Municipality: Eilsleben

Area
  - Total: 13.50 km^{2} (5.21 sq mi)
- Elevation: 132 m (433 ft)

Population (2009-12-31)
  - Total: 404
  - Density: 29.9/km^{2} (77.5/sq mi)
- Time zone: UTC+01:00 (CET)
  - Summer (DST): UTC+02:00 (CEST)
- Postal codes: 39365
- Dialling codes: 039409
- Vehicle registration: BK

Ovelgünne is a village in the municipality of Eilsleben, Saxony-Anhalt, Germany. Before September 2010, it was an independent municipality.
