= Wieglitz =

- Ortsteil of Bülstringen
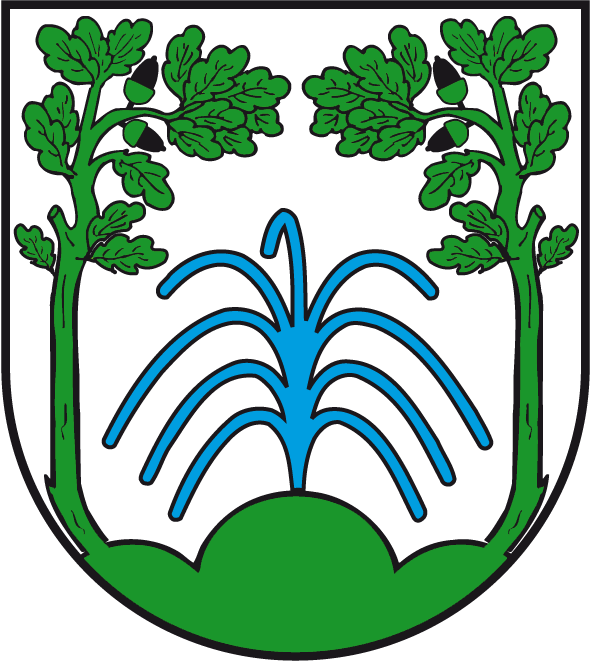
- Coat of arms
- Interactive map of Wieglitz
- Location within Germany Location within Saxony-Anhalt
- Coordinates: 52°22′N 11°19′E
- Country: Germany
- State: Saxony-Anhalt
- District: Börde
- Municipality: Bülstringen

Area
  - Total: 59.14 km^{2} (22.83 sq mi)
- Elevation: 53 m (174 ft)

Population (2006-12-31)
  - Total: 191
  - Density: 3.23/km^{2} (8.36/sq mi)
- Time zone: UTC+01:00 (CET)
  - Summer (DST): UTC+02:00 (CEST)
- Postal codes: 39345
- Dialling codes: 039058

Wieglitz is a village and a former municipality in the Börde district in Saxony-Anhalt, Germany. Since 1 January 2010, it is part of the municipality Bülstringen.
