= Emden, Saxony-Anhalt =

Emden
- Ortsteil of Altenhausen
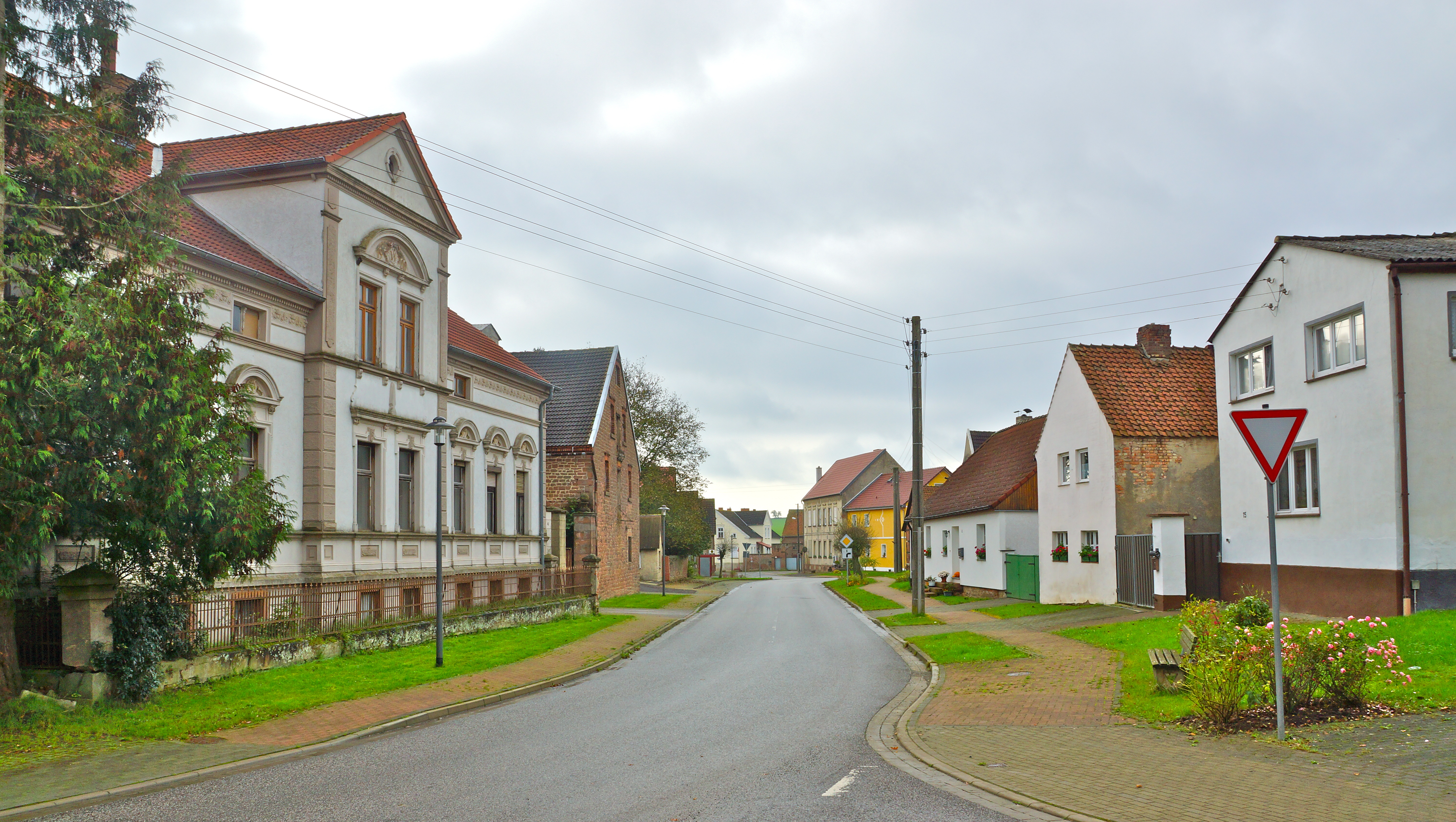
- Interactive map of Emden
- Location within Germany Location within Saxony-Anhalt
- Coordinates: 52°14′N 11°16′E
- Country: Germany
- State: Saxony-Anhalt
- District: Börde
- Municipality: Altenhausen

Area
  - Total: 16.43 km^{2} (6.34 sq mi)
- Elevation: 126 m (413 ft)

Population (2006-12-31)
  - Total: 298
  - Density: 18.1/km^{2} (47.0/sq mi)
- Time zone: UTC+01:00 (CET)
  - Summer (DST): UTC+02:00 (CEST)
- Postal codes: 39343
- Dialling codes: 03 90 52
- Vehicle registration: BK

Emden is a village and a former municipality in the Börde district in Saxony-Anhalt, Germany.

Since 1 January 2010, it is part of the municipality Altenhausen.
