= Loitsche =

- Ortsteil of Loitsche-Heinrichsberg
- Coat of arms
- Interactive map of Loitsche
- Location within Germany Location within Saxony-Anhalt
- Coordinates: 52°17′46″N 11°41′57″E
- Country: Germany
- State: Saxony-Anhalt
- District: Börde
- Municipality: Loitsche-Heinrichsberg

Area
  - Total: 19.43 km^{2} (7.50 sq mi)
- Elevation: 39 m (128 ft)

Population (2006-12-31)
  - Total: 679
  - Density: 34.9/km^{2} (90.5/sq mi)
- Time zone: UTC+01:00 (CET)
  - Summer (DST): UTC+02:00 (CEST)
- Postal codes: 39326
- Dialling codes: 039208
- Vehicle registration: BK
- Website: www.elbe-heide.de

Loitsche is a village and a former municipality in the Börde district in Sachsen-Anhalt, Germany. Since 1 January 2010, it is part of the municipality Loitsche-Heinrichsberg.

Loitsche is about 20 km north of Magdeburg. Loitsche has about 674 inhabitants (2005). Loitsche has a size of 19,43 km².

== Notable people ==
- Bill Kaulitz, singer of Tokio Hotel
- Tom Kaulitz, guitarist of Tokio Hotel
