= Hillersleben =

- Ortsteil of Westheide
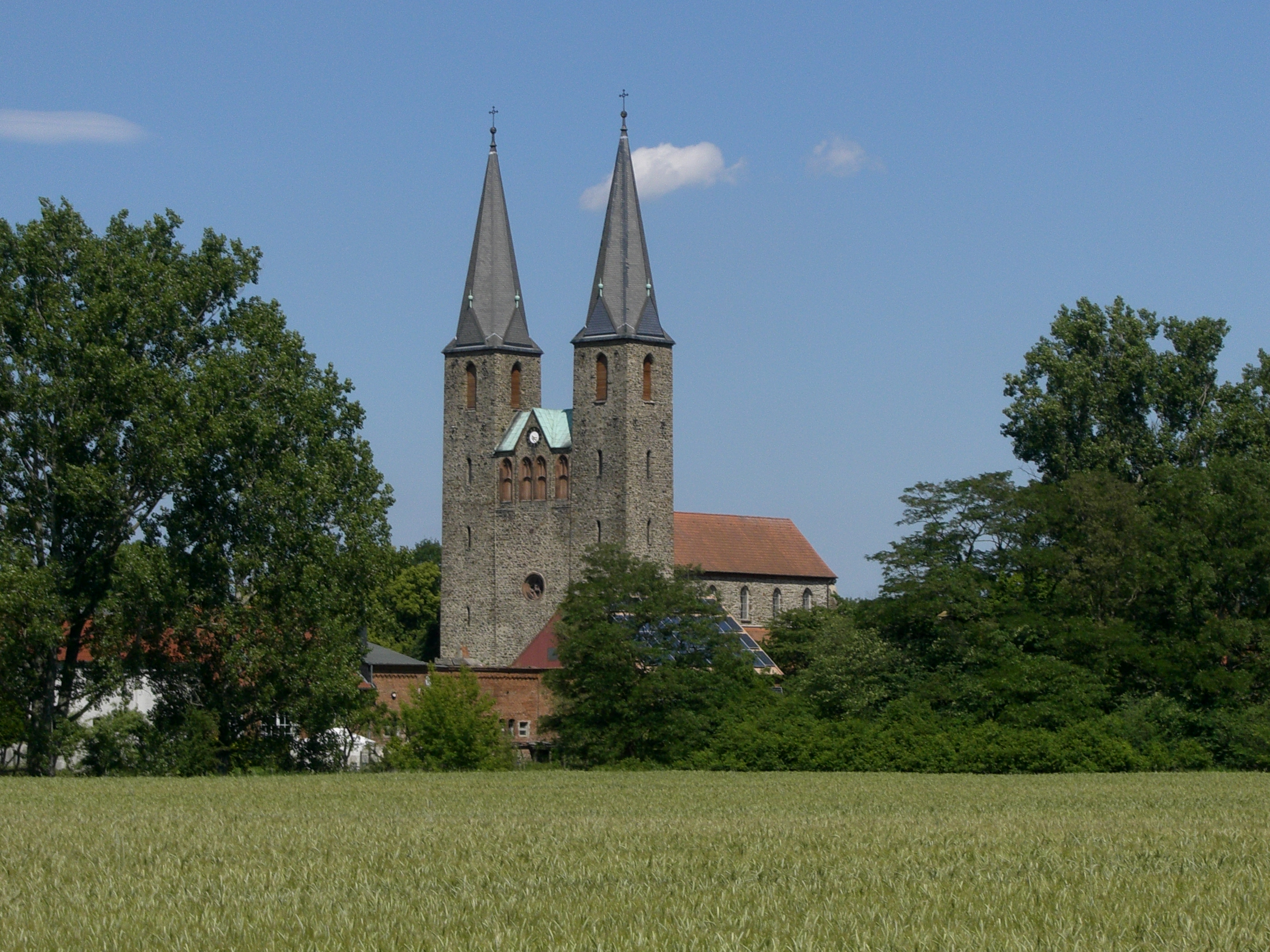
- St. Laurentius Church of the former Benedictine nuns monastery in Hillersleben

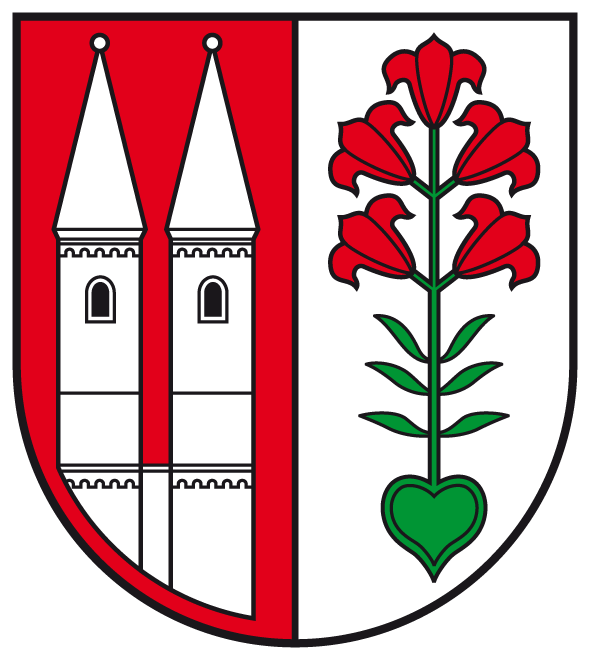
- Coat of arms

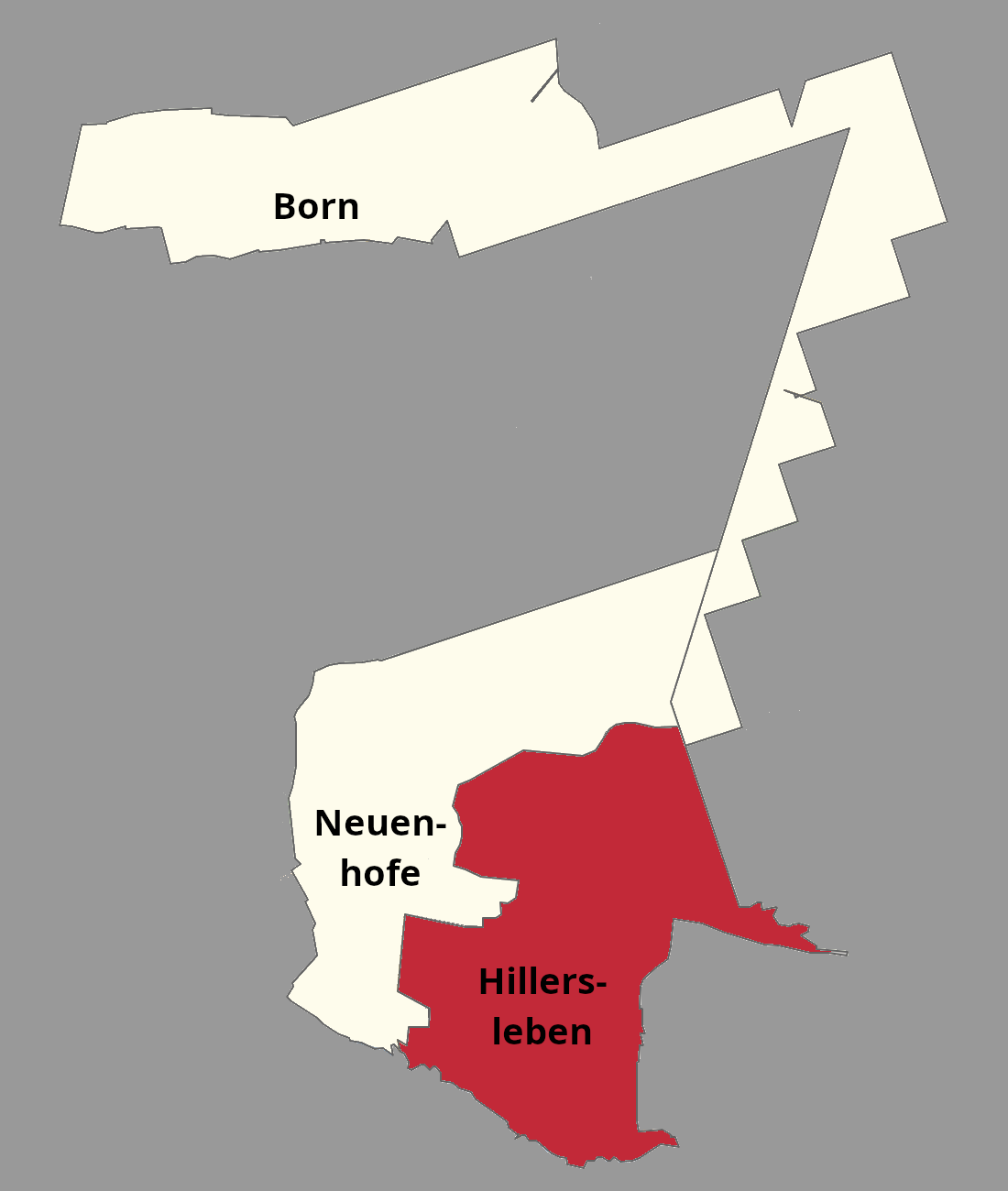
- Hillersleben in Westheide
- Interactive map of Hillersleben
- Location within Germany Location within Saxony-Anhalt
- Coordinates: 52°16′N 11°29′E
- Country: Germany
- State: Saxony-Anhalt
- District: Börde
- Municipality: Westheide

Area
  - Total: 15.25 km^{2} (5.89 sq mi)
- Elevation: 48 m (157 ft)

Population (2006-12-31)
  - Total: 844
  - Density: 55.3/km^{2} (143/sq mi)
- Time zone: UTC+01:00 (CET)
  - Summer (DST): UTC+02:00 (CEST)
- Postal codes: 39343
- Dialling codes: 039202, 03904
- Vehicle registration: BK

Hillersleben is a village and a former municipality in the Börde district in Saxony-Anhalt, Germany. A large proving ground for artillery operated there from 1934 to 1945. Since 1 January 2010, it is part of the municipality Westheide.
