= Belsdorf =

- Ortsteil of Flechtingen
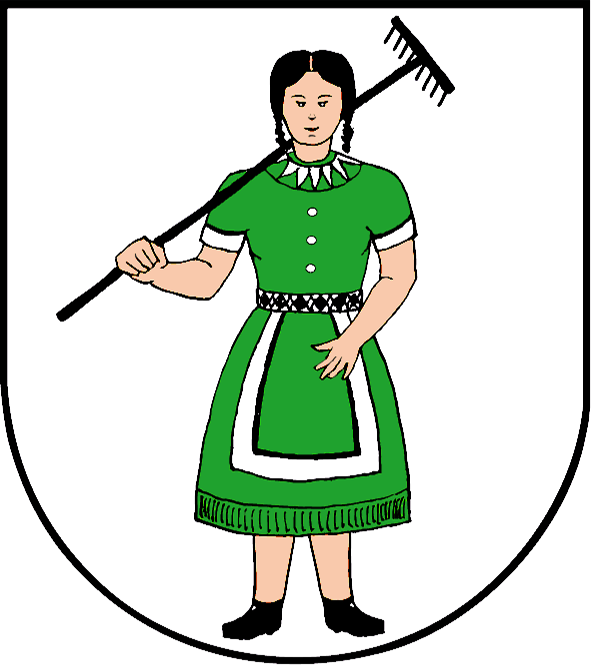
- Coat of arms
- Interactive map of Belsdorf
- Location within Germany Location within Saxony-Anhalt
- Coordinates: 52°20′N 11°9′E
- Country: Germany
- State: Saxony-Anhalt
- District: Börde
- Municipality: Flechtingen

Area
  - Total: 9.94 km^{2} (3.84 sq mi)
- Elevation: 127 m (417 ft)

Population (2006-12-31)
  - Total: 196
  - Density: 19.7/km^{2} (51.1/sq mi)
- Time zone: UTC+01:00 (CET)
  - Summer (DST): UTC+02:00 (CEST)
- Postal codes: 39356
- Dialling codes: 039055
- Vehicle registration: BK

Belsdorf (German pronunciation: [ˈbɛlsdɔʁf]) is a village and a former municipality in the Börde district in Saxony-Anhalt, Germany.

Since 1 January 2010, it is part of the municipality Flechtingen.
