= Wormsdorf =

- Ortsteil of Eilsleben
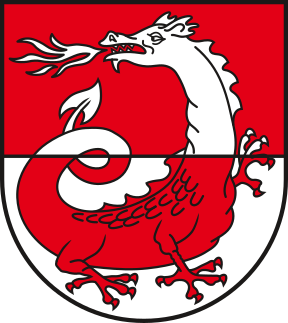
- Coat of arms
- Interactive map of Wormsdorf
- Location within Germany Location within Saxony-Anhalt
- Coordinates: 52°7′59″N 11°11′23″E
- Country: Germany
- State: Saxony-Anhalt
- District: Börde
- Municipality: Eilsleben

Area
  - Total: 13.69 km^{2} (5.29 sq mi)
- Elevation: 146 m (479 ft)

Population (2006-12-31)
  - Total: 549
  - Density: 40.1/km^{2} (104/sq mi)
- Time zone: UTC+01:00 (CET)
  - Summer (DST): UTC+02:00 (CEST)
- Postal codes: 39365
- Dialling codes: 039409
- Vehicle registration: BK

Wormsdorf is a village and a former municipality in the Börde district in Saxony-Anhalt, Germany. Since 1 January 2010, it is part of the municipality Eilsleben.
