= Bregenstedt =

- Ortsteil of Erxleben
- Coat of arms
- Interactive map of Bregenstedt
- Location within Germany Location within Saxony-Anhalt
- Coordinates: 52°15′N 11°13′E
- Country: Germany
- State: Saxony-Anhalt
- District: Börde
- Municipality: Erxleben

Area
  - Total: 6.46 km^{2} (2.49 sq mi)
- Elevation: 139 m (456 ft)

Population (2006-12-31)
  - Total: 549
  - Density: 85.0/km^{2} (220/sq mi)
- Time zone: UTC+01:00 (CET)
  - Summer (DST): UTC+02:00 (CEST)
- Postal codes: 39343
- Dialling codes: 039052

Bregenstedt is a village and a former municipality in the Börde district in Saxony-Anhalt, Germany. Since 1 January 2010, it is part of the municipality Erxleben.
