= Born, Saxony-Anhalt =

Born
- Ortsteil of Westheide
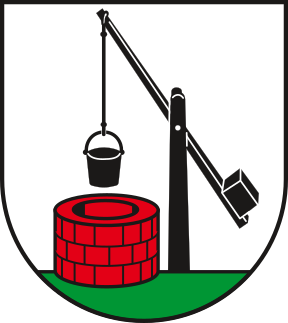
- Coat of arms

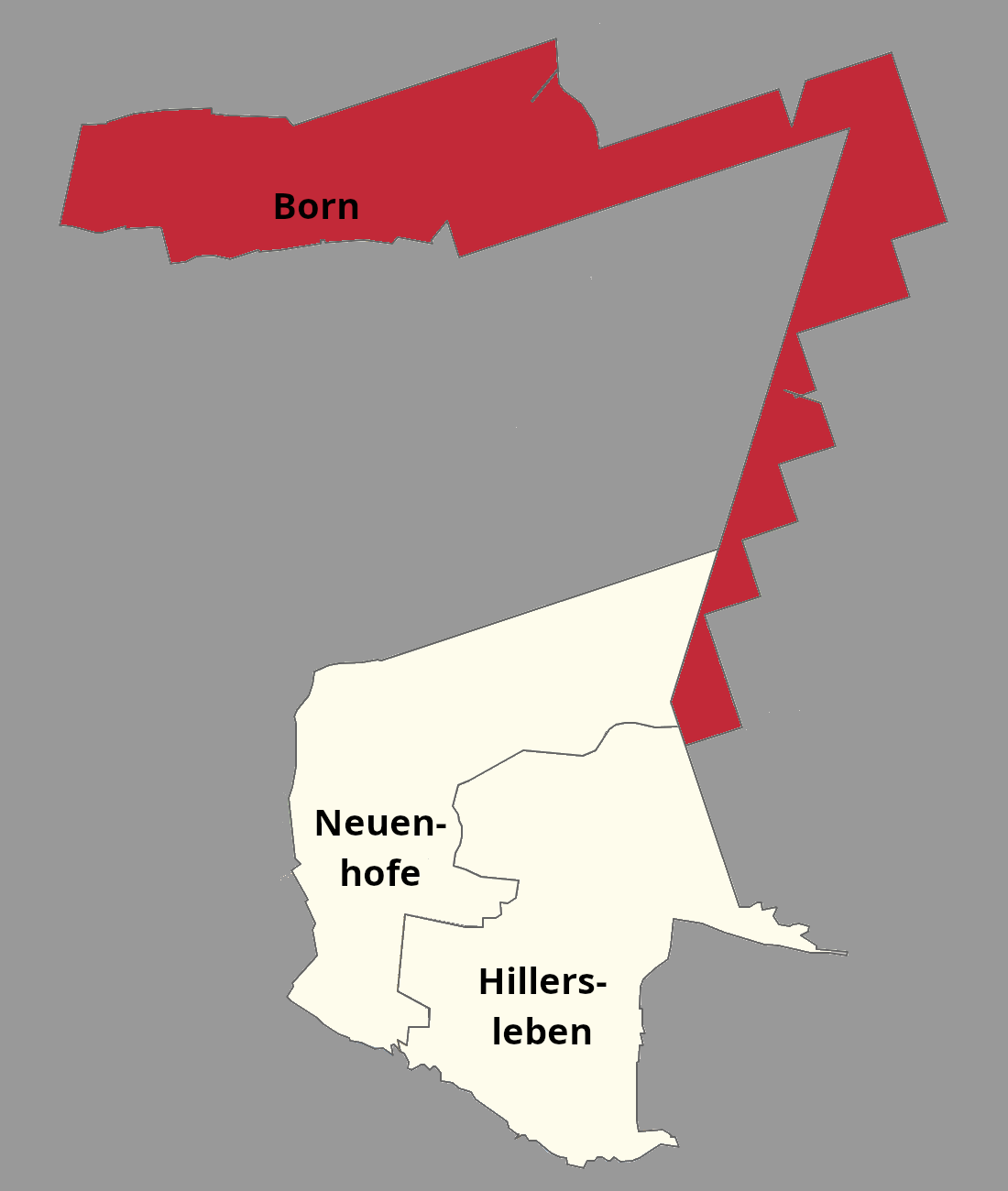
- Born in Westheide
- Interactive map of Born
- Location within Germany Location within Saxony-Anhalt
- Coordinates: 52°22′32″N 11°28′14″E
- Country: Germany
- State: Saxony-Anhalt
- District: Börde
- Municipality: Westheide

Area
  - Total: 20.62 km^{2} (7.96 sq mi)
- Elevation: 80 m (260 ft)

Population (2006-12-31)
  - Total: 239
  - Density: 11.6/km^{2} (30.0/sq mi)
- Time zone: UTC+01:00 (CET)
  - Summer (DST): UTC+02:00 (CEST)
- Postal codes: 39345
- Dialling codes: 039056
- Vehicle registration: BK
- Website: www.elbe-heide.de

Born is a village and a former municipality in the Börde district in Saxony-Anhalt, Germany. Since 1 January 2010, it is part of the municipality Westheide.
