= Sandbeiendorf =

- Ortsteil of Burgstall
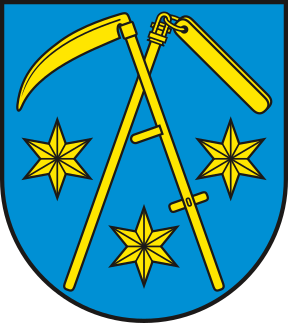
- Coat of arms
- Interactive map of Sandbeiendorf
- Location within Germany Location within Saxony-Anhalt
- Coordinates: 52°23′35″N 11°43′0″E
- Country: Germany
- State: Saxony-Anhalt
- District: Börde
- Municipality: Burgstall

Area
  - Total: 8.9 km^{2} (3.4 sq mi)
- Elevation: 42 m (138 ft)

Population (2006-12-31)
  - Total: 280
  - Density: 31/km^{2} (81/sq mi)
- Time zone: UTC+01:00 (CET)
  - Summer (DST): UTC+02:00 (CEST)
- Postal codes: 39517
- Dialling codes: 039364
- Vehicle registration: BK
- Website: www.elbe-heide.de

Sandbeiendorf (German pronunciation: [ˌzantˈbaɪəndɔʁf]) is a village and a former municipality in the Börde district in Saxony-Anhalt, Germany. Since 1 January 2010, it is part of the municipality Burgstall.
