= Altenhausen =

- Municipality
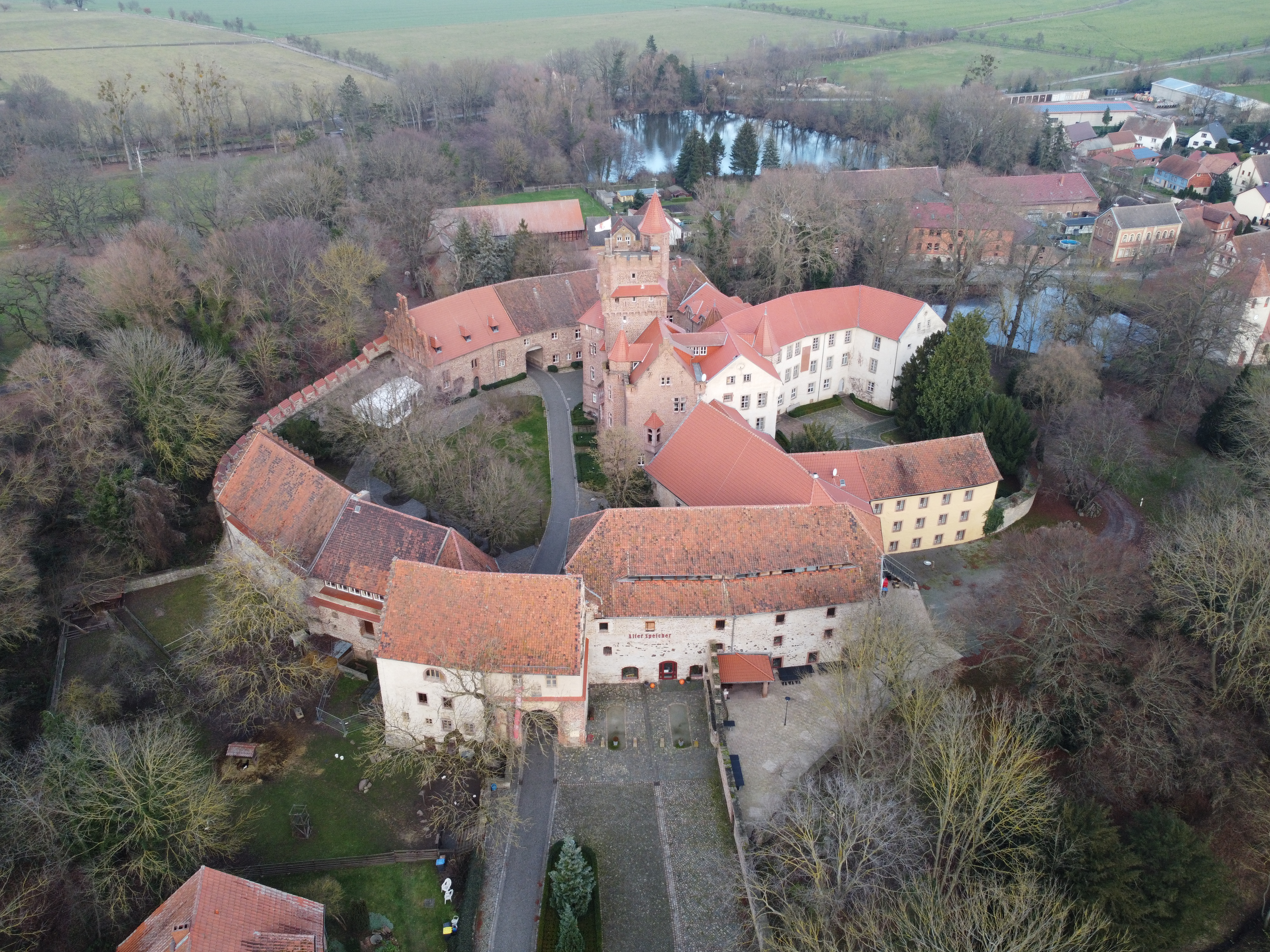

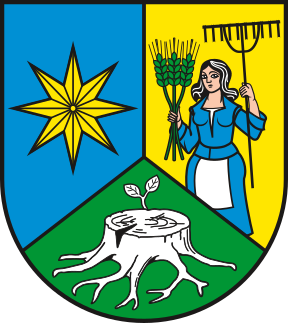
- Coat of arms

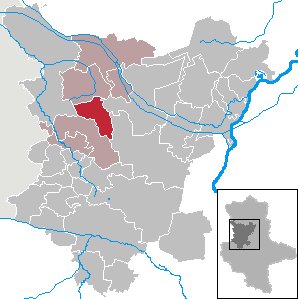
- Location of Altenhausen within Börde district
- Interactive map of Altenhausen
- Location within Germany Location within Saxony-Anhalt
- Coordinates: 52°15′N 11°15′E
- Country: Germany
- State: Saxony-Anhalt
- District: Börde
- Municipal assoc.: Flechtingen

Government
  - Mayor (2020–27): Matthias Horsika

Area
  - Total: 43.17 km^{2} (16.67 sq mi)
- Elevation: 118 m (387 ft)

Population (2025-12-31)
  - Total: 967
  - Density: 22.4/km^{2} (58.0/sq mi)
- Time zone: UTC+01:00 (CET)
  - Summer (DST): UTC+02:00 (CEST)
- Postal codes: 39343
- Dialling codes: 039052
- Vehicle registration: BK, OK

Altenhausen is a municipality in the Börde district in Saxony-Anhalt, Germany. On 1 January 2010 it absorbed the former municipalities Emden and Ivenrode.
