= Wefensleben =

- Municipality
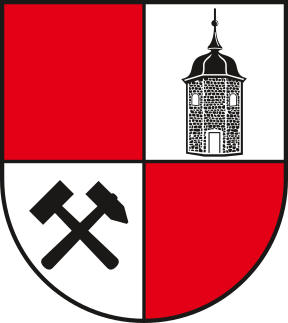
- Coat of arms

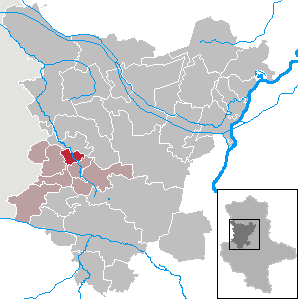
- Location of Wefensleben within Börde district
- Interactive map of Wefensleben
- Location within Germany Location within Saxony-Anhalt
- Coordinates: 52°11′6″N 11°9′36″E
- Country: Germany
- State: Saxony-Anhalt
- District: Börde
- Municipal assoc.: Obere Aller
- Subdivisions: 2 boroughs

Government
  - Mayor (2022–29): Marko Bader

Area
  - Total: 12.63 km^{2} (4.88 sq mi)
- Elevation: 123 m (404 ft)

Population (2025-12-31)
  - Total: 1,632
  - Density: 129.2/km^{2} (334.7/sq mi)
- Time zone: UTC+01:00 (CET)
  - Summer (DST): UTC+02:00 (CEST)
- Postal codes: 39365
- Dialling codes: 039400
- Vehicle registration: BK, BÖ, HDL, OC, OK, WMS, WZL
- Website: www.obere-aller.de

Wefensleben is a village and a municipality in the Börde district in Saxony-Anhalt, Germany. Since 1 January 2010, it is part of the collective municipality Obere Aller.

== Geography ==
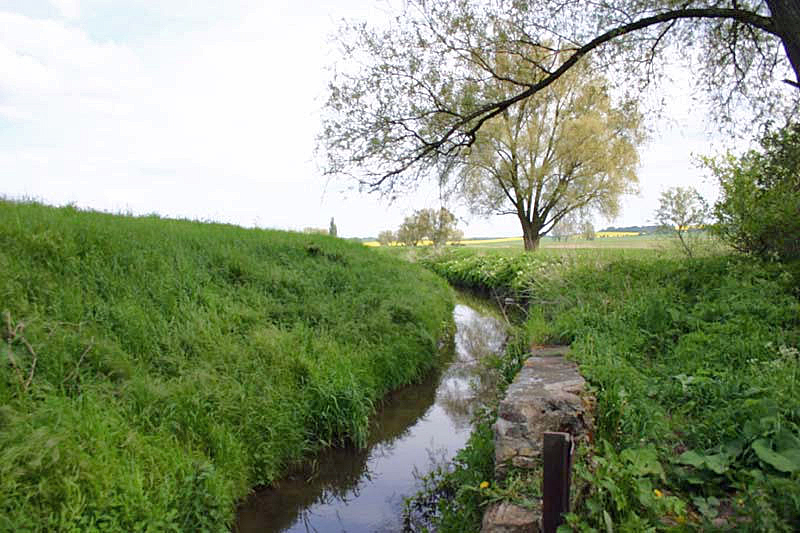
The river Aller near Wefensleben

Wefensleben is situated on the river Aller, in the lowland between the foothills of the Lappwald and the Osterberg (166 m (545 ft)). In the west is a forest of 24 ha (59 acres) named "Trenckmann's Busch" or "Zechenholz".

== Village ==
Parts of Wefensleben are Wefensleben, the borough Belsdorf and the living-place Zechenhaus.

== History ==
The first documentarily mention occurred in the year 1160 in the property list of the St. Ludger's Abbey in Helmstedt (German: Kloster St. Ludgeri).

To middle of the 18th century Wefensleben is a pure farmer village. In the district available mineral resources influenced the evolution of the place.
With the discovery of a coal seam in 1741 the coal mining began. Until 1825 coal was won in up to 12 shafts. From 1809 the Zechenhaus was the seat of the Eastphalian mountain and hut administration and from 1815 up to 1843 of the mountain and hut administration of the government district of Magdeburg.
Between 1750 and 1900 3 quarries were operated to produce sandstone blocks as building material for many sacral and profane buildings in Central Germany.
In the 1970s several Plattenbauten were built in the village and Wefensleben became a sleep and living place for the attendants of the Helmstedt–Marienborn border crossing and their families. At this time many members of the Stasi moved to Wefensleben especially attendants of the Passkontrolleinheit (PKE) a division of the former Eastern Germany secret service who worked at the border crossing.

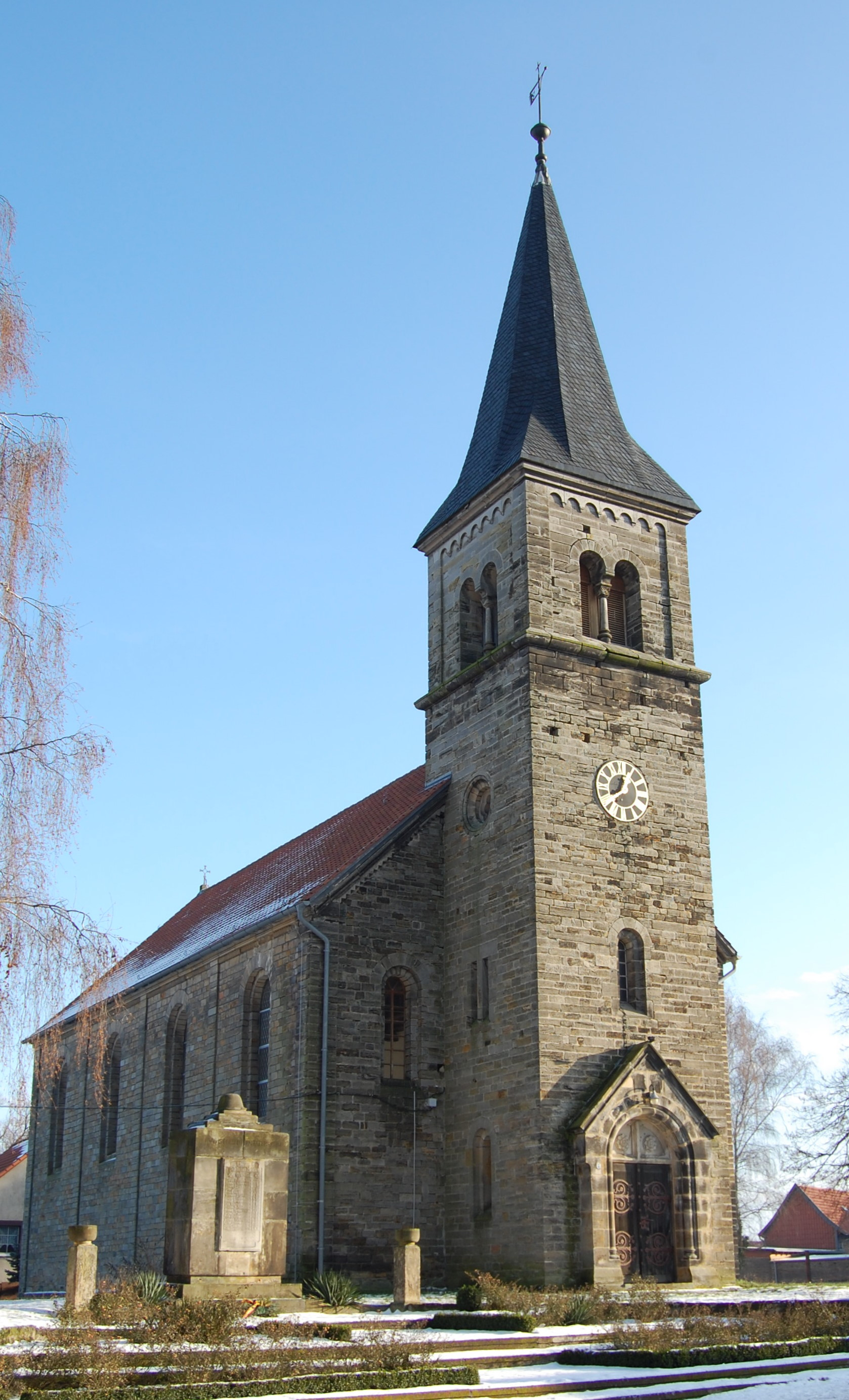
church Belsdorf

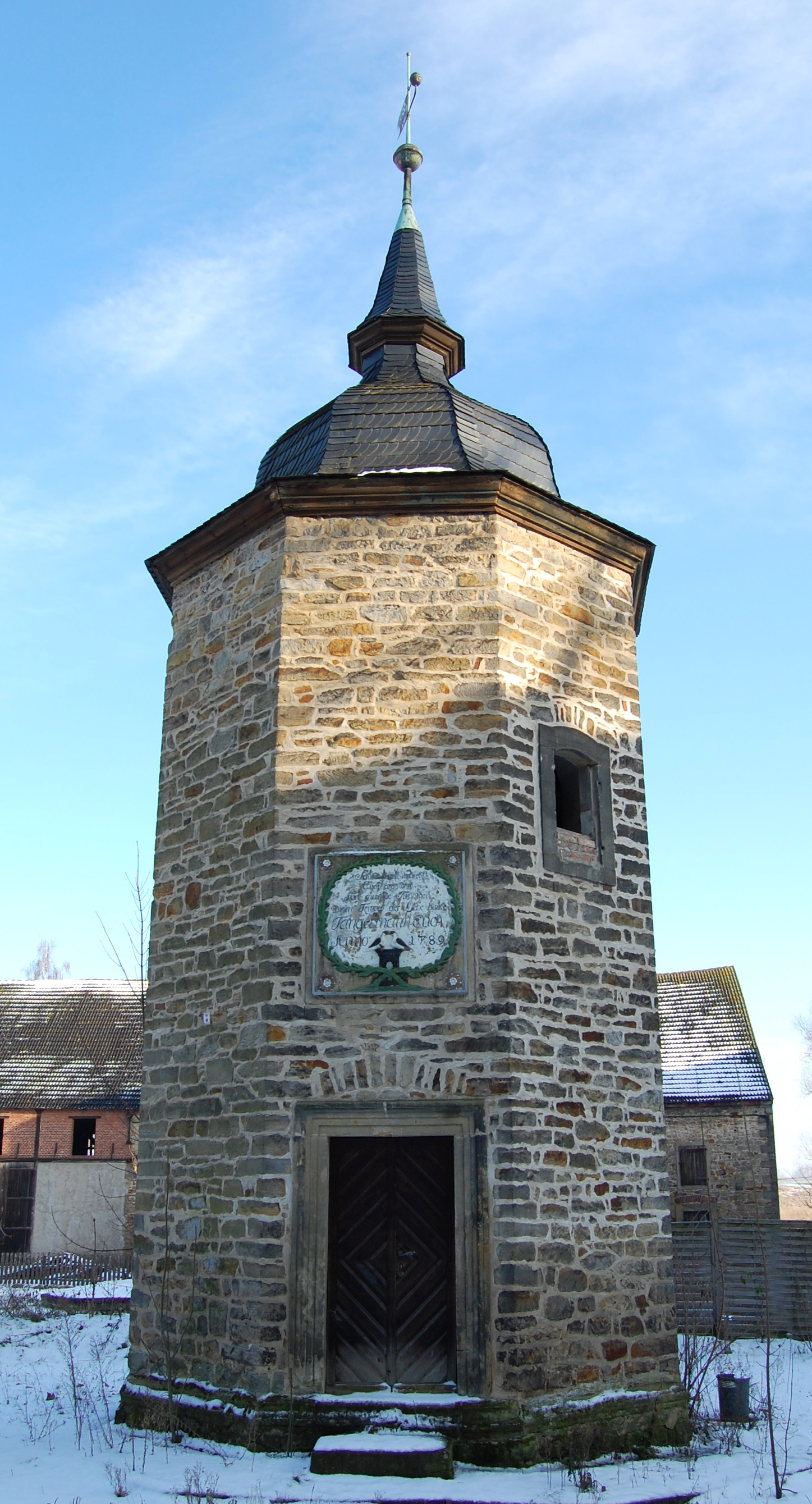
dove tower on the farmstead Tangermann
