= Erxleben, Börde =

Erxleben
- Municipality
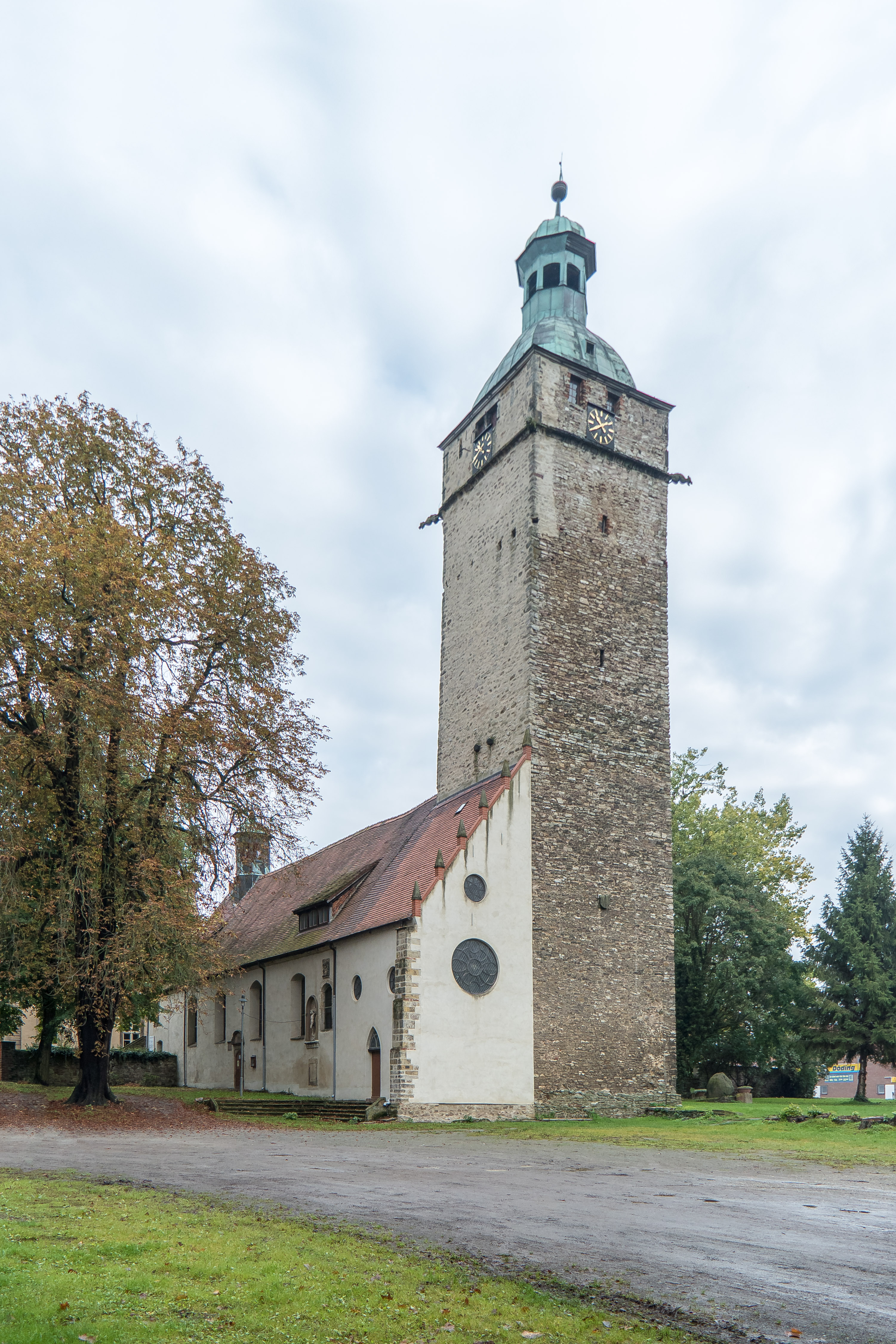

- Coat of arms

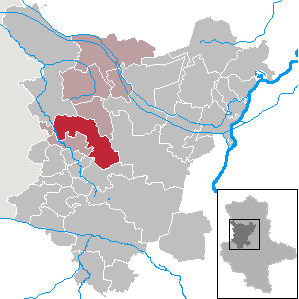
- Location of Erxleben within Börde district
- Interactive map of Erxleben
- Location within Germany Location within Saxony-Anhalt
- Coordinates: 52°13′N 11°15′E
- Country: Germany
- State: Saxony-Anhalt
- District: Börde
- Municipal assoc.: Flechtingen

Government
  - Mayor (2021–28): Christian Jungenitz

Area
  - Total: 83.39 km^{2} (32.20 sq mi)
- Elevation: 128 m (420 ft)

Population (2025-12-31)
  - Total: 2,659
  - Density: 31.89/km^{2} (82.59/sq mi)
- Time zone: UTC+01:00 (CET)
  - Summer (DST): UTC+02:00 (CEST)
- Postal codes: 39343
- Dialling codes: 039052, 039050, 039052, 039062, 039409
- Vehicle registration: BK

Erxleben is a municipality in the Börde district in Saxony-Anhalt, Germany. On 31 December 2009 it absorbed the former municipality Bregenstedt, followed by the former municipalities Bartensleben, Hakenstedt and Uhrsleben on 1 January 2010. The municipality consists of the Ortsteile (municipal divisions) Bregenstedt, Erxleben, Groß Bartensleben, Groppendorf, Hakenstedt, Klein Bartensleben and Uhrsleben.

Erxleben Castle was owned by the House of Alvensleben from around 1270 until expropriation in 1945 by communist East Germany.

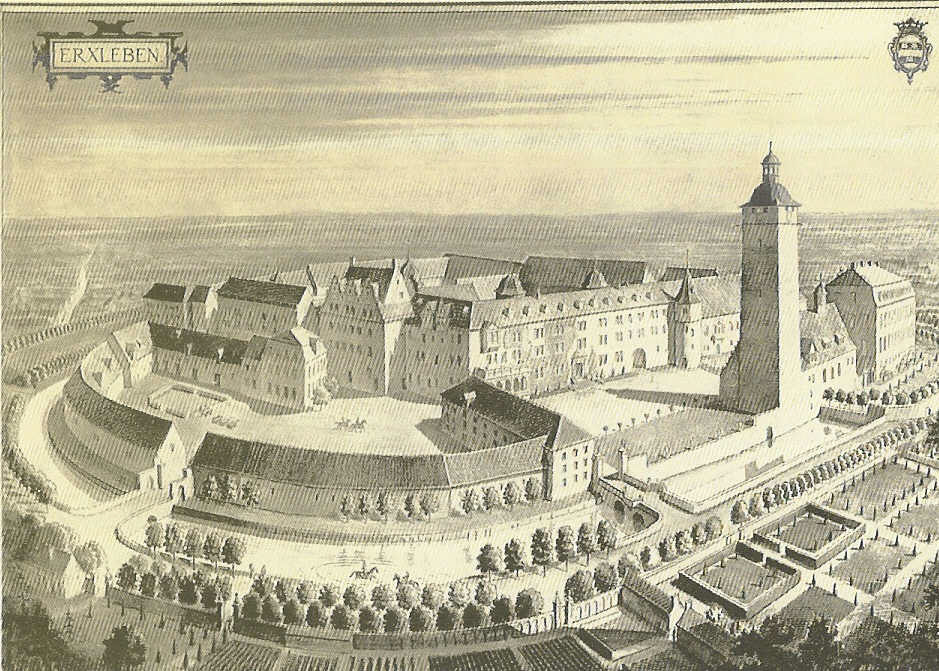
Erxleben Castle
