= Obere Aller =

Municipality in Saxony-Anhalt, Germany

- Verbandsgemeinde
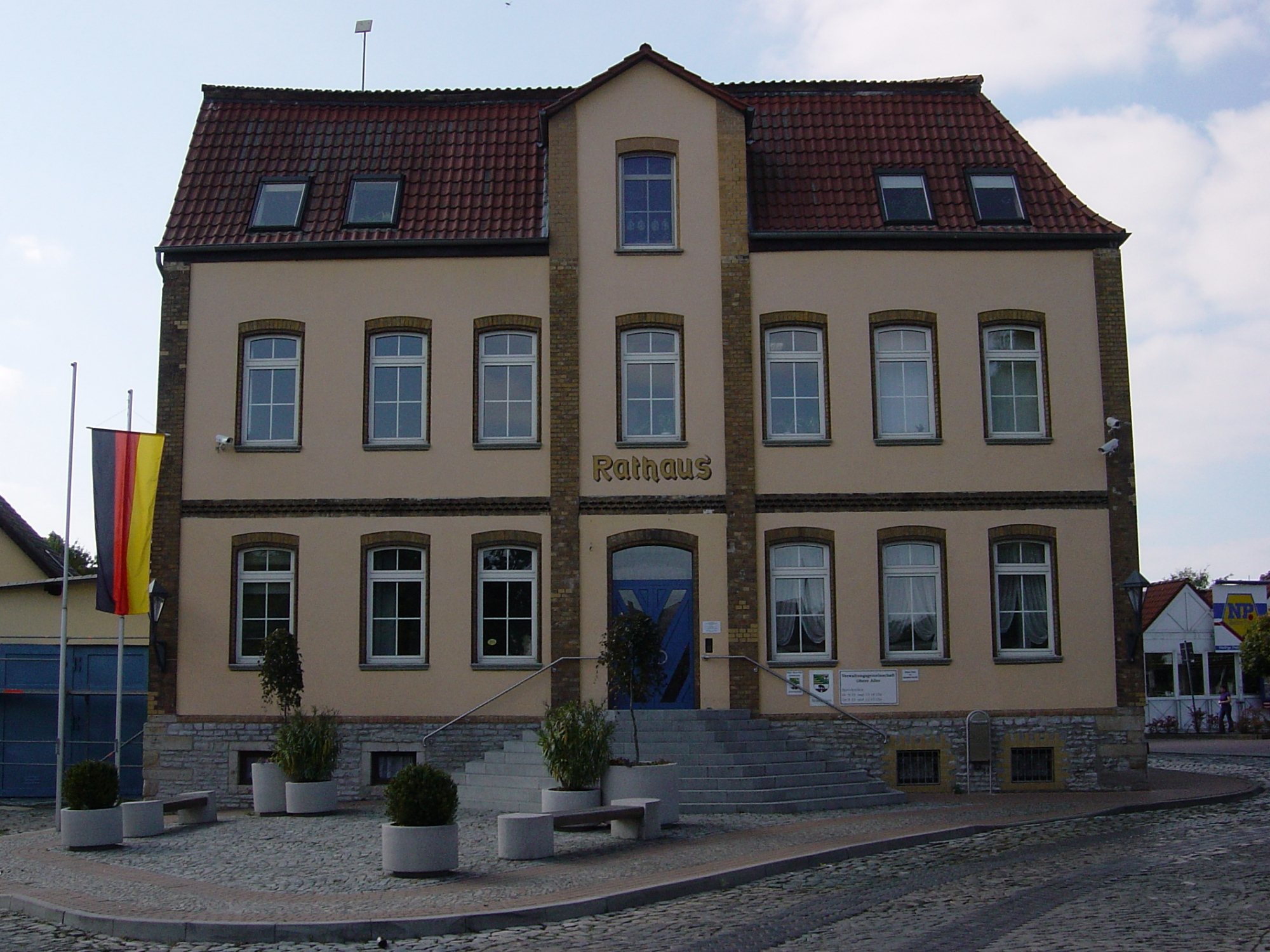
- Rathaus in Eilsleben: seat of the Verbandsgemeinde Obere Aller

- Map of Börde highlighting Obere Aller
- Interactive map of Obere Aller
- Location within Germany Location within Saxony-Anhalt
- Coordinates: 52°09′N 11°13′E
- Country: Germany
- State: Saxony-Anhalt
- District: Börde
- Seat: Eilsleben
- Subdivisions: 7 municipalities

Area
  - Total: 210.15 km^{2} (81.14 sq mi)

Population (2025-12-31)
  - Total: 13,431
  - Density: 63.911/km^{2} (165.53/sq mi)
- Time zone: UTC+01:00 (CET)
  - Summer (DST): UTC+02:00 (CEST)
- Website: www.obere-aller.de

Obere Aller is a Verbandsgemeinde ("collective municipality") in the Börde district in Saxony-Anhalt, Germany. Before 1 January 2010, it was a Verwaltungsgemeinschaft. It is situated approximately 30 km west of Magdeburg. It is named after the upper course of the river Aller, in its territory. The seat of the Verbandsgemeinde is in Eilsleben.

The Verbandsgemeinde Obere Aller consists of the following municipalities:

- Eilsleben
- Harbke
- Hötensleben
- Sommersdorf
- Ummendorf
- Völpke
- Wefensleben
