= Ivenrode =

- Ortsteil of Altenhausen
- Coat of arms
- Interactive map of Ivenrode
- Location within Germany Location within Saxony-Anhalt
- Coordinates: 52°16′N 11°13′E
- Country: Germany
- State: Saxony-Anhalt
- District: Börde
- Municipality: Altenhausen

Area
  - Total: 10.55 km^{2} (4.07 sq mi)
- Elevation: 150 m (490 ft)

Population (2006-12-31)
  - Total: 510
  - Density: 48/km^{2} (130/sq mi)
- Time zone: UTC+01:00 (CET)
  - Summer (DST): UTC+02:00 (CEST)
- Postal codes: 39343
- Dialling codes: 039052
- Vehicle registration: BK

Ivenrode is a village and a former municipality in the Börde district in Saxony-Anhalt, Germany.

Since 1 January 2010, it is part of the municipality Altenhausen.
