= Uhrsleben =

- Ortsteil of Erxleben
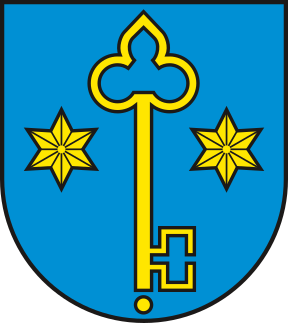
- Coat of arms
- Interactive map of Uhrsleben
- Location within Germany Location within Saxony-Anhalt
- Coordinates: 52°12′N 11°16′E
- Country: Germany
- State: Saxony-Anhalt
- District: Börde
- Municipality: Erxleben

Area
  - Total: 11.02 km^{2} (4.25 sq mi)
- Elevation: 125 m (410 ft)

Population (2006-12-31)
  - Total: 476
  - Density: 43.2/km^{2} (112/sq mi)
- Time zone: UTC+01:00 (CET)
  - Summer (DST): UTC+02:00 (CEST)
- Postal codes: 39343
- Dialling codes: 039052
- Vehicle registration: BK

Uhrsleben is a village and a former municipality in the Börde district in Saxony-Anhalt, Germany.

Since 1 January 2010, it is part of the municipality Erxleben.
