= Johann Karl Wilhelm Vatke =

German Protestant theologian

Johann Karl Wilhelm Vatke, known as Wilhelm Vatke (March 14, 1806 – April 18, 1882) was a German Protestant theologian, born in Behnsdorf, near Magdeburg. After acting as Privatdozent in Berlin, he was appointed in 1837 professor extraordinarius.

Vatke was one of the founders of the newer Hexateuch criticism. In the same year in which David Strauss published his Life of Jesus, Vatke issued his book, Die Religion des Alten Testaments nach den kanonischen Büchern entwickelt, which contained the seeds of a revolution in the ideas held about the Old Testament. Since, however, his book was too philosophical to be popular, the author's theories were practically unnoticed for a generation, and the new ideas are now associated especially with the names of Abraham Kuenen and Julius Wellhausen.

His other works include: Die menschliche Freiheit in ihrem Verhältniss zur Sünde und zur göttlichen Gnade (1841), Historisch-kritische Einleitung in das Alte Testament (1886), and Religionsphilosophie (1888). See O Pfleiderer, Development of Theology (1890), and TK Cheyne, Founders of Old Testament Criticism (1893).

He died in Berlin.
