= Westheide =

- Municipality
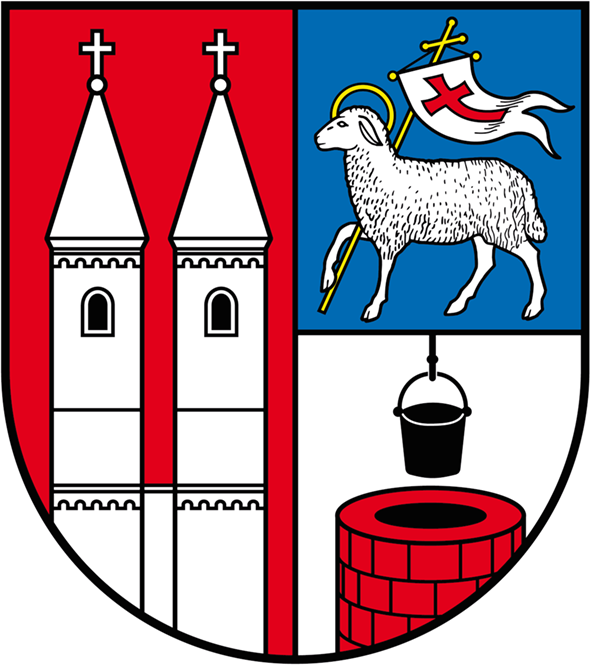
- Coat of arms

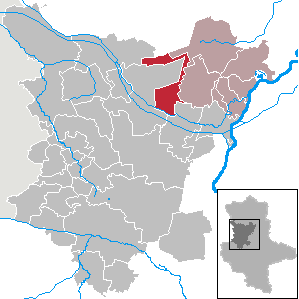
- Location of Westheide within Börde district
- Interactive map of Westheide
- Location within Germany Location within Saxony-Anhalt
- Coordinates: 52°17′N 11°28′E
- Country: Germany
- State: Saxony-Anhalt
- District: Börde
- Municipal assoc.: Elbe-Heide

Government
  - Mayor (2022–29): Romy Staufenbiel

Area
  - Total: 50.84 km^{2} (19.63 sq mi)

Population (2025-12-31)
  - Total: 1,633
  - Density: 32.12/km^{2} (83.19/sq mi)
- Time zone: UTC+01:00 (CET)
  - Summer (DST): UTC+02:00 (CEST)
- Postal codes: 39343, 39345
- Dialling codes: 03904, 039056, 039202
- Vehicle registration: BK, OK
- Website: www.elbe-heide.de

Westheide is a municipality in the Börde district in Saxony-Anhalt, Germany. It was formed on 1 January 2010 by the merger of the former municipalities Born, Hillersleben and Neuenhofe.
