= Hakenstedt =

Village in Saxony-Anhalt, Germany

- Ortsteil of Erxleben
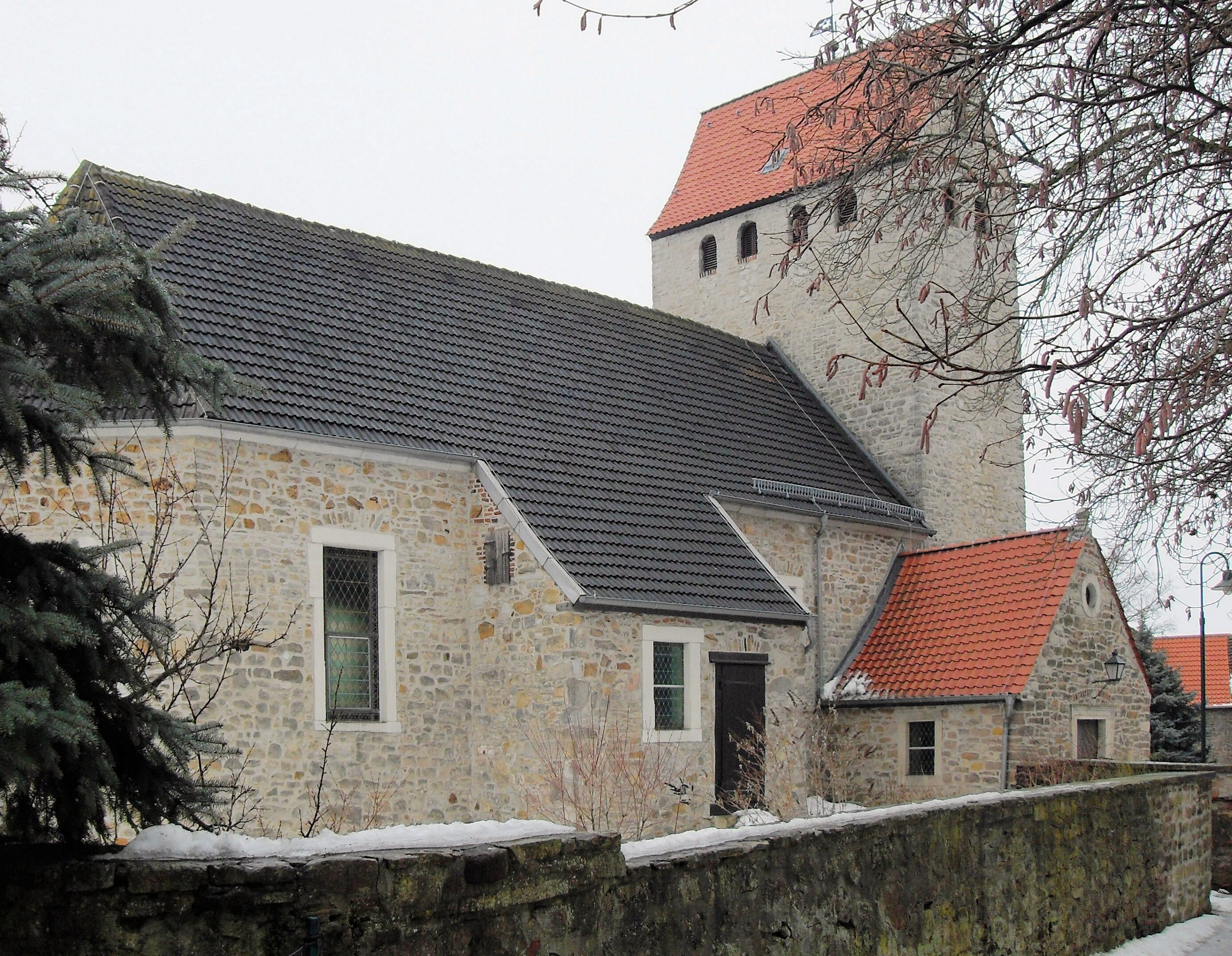
- Saint Mary's Church
- Interactive map of Hakenstedt
- Location within Germany Location within Saxony-Anhalt
- Coordinates: 52°11′N 11°16′E
- Country: Germany
- State: Saxony-Anhalt
- District: Börde
- Municipality: Erxleben

Area
  - Total: 17.08 km^{2} (6.59 sq mi)
- Elevation: 144 m (472 ft)

Population (2006-12-31)
  - Total: 577
  - Density: 33.8/km^{2} (87.5/sq mi)
- Time zone: UTC+01:00 (CET)
  - Summer (DST): UTC+02:00 (CEST)
- Postal codes: 39343
- Dialling codes: 039062, 039409
- Vehicle registration: BK

Hakenstedt is a village and a former municipality in the Börde district in Saxony-Anhalt, Germany.

Since 1 January 2010, it is part of the municipality Erxleben.
