= Sommersdorf =

- Municipality
- Coat of arms

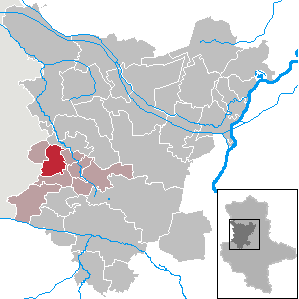
- Location of Sommersdorf within Börde district
- Interactive map of Sommersdorf
- Location within Germany Location within Saxony-Anhalt
- Coordinates: 52°10′N 11°5′E
- Country: Germany
- State: Saxony-Anhalt
- District: Börde
- Municipal assoc.: Obere Aller

Government
  - Mayor (2022–29): Hendrikje Riechers-Knape

Area
  - Total: 29.31 km^{2} (11.32 sq mi)
- Elevation: 165 m (541 ft)

Population (2025-12-31)
  - Total: 1,252
  - Density: 42.72/km^{2} (110.6/sq mi)
- Time zone: UTC+01:00 (CET)
  - Summer (DST): UTC+02:00 (CEST)
- Postal codes: 39365
- Dialling codes: 039402
- Vehicle registration: BK
- Website: www.sommersdorf.de

Sommersdorf is a municipality in the Börde district in Saxony-Anhalt, Germany. On 1 January 2010 it absorbed the former municipality Marienborn.
