= Domfelsen =

Rock formation in Germany

Coordinates: 52°07′22″N 11°38′12″E

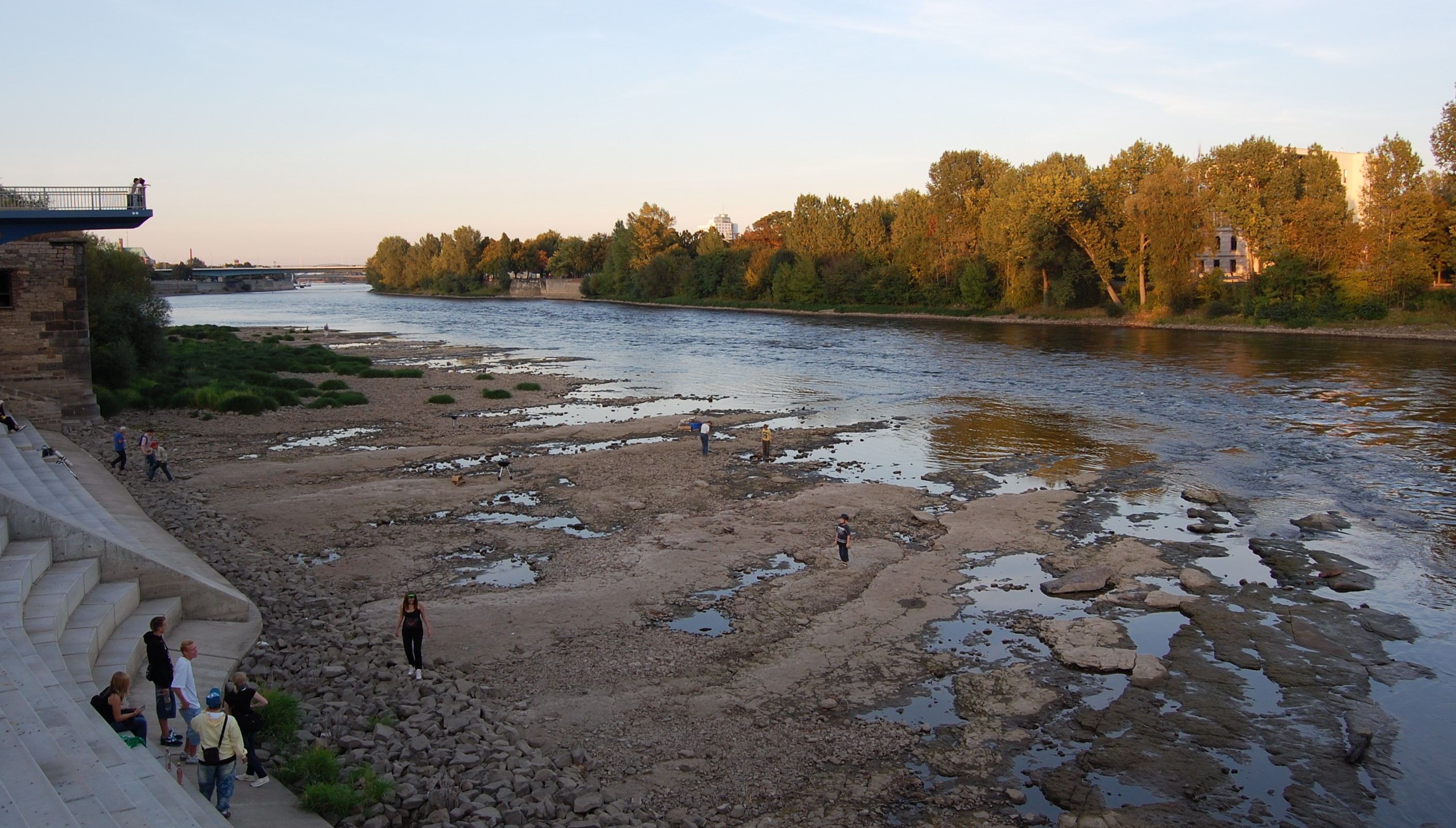
The exposed Domfelsen in the Elbe; view downstream looking north

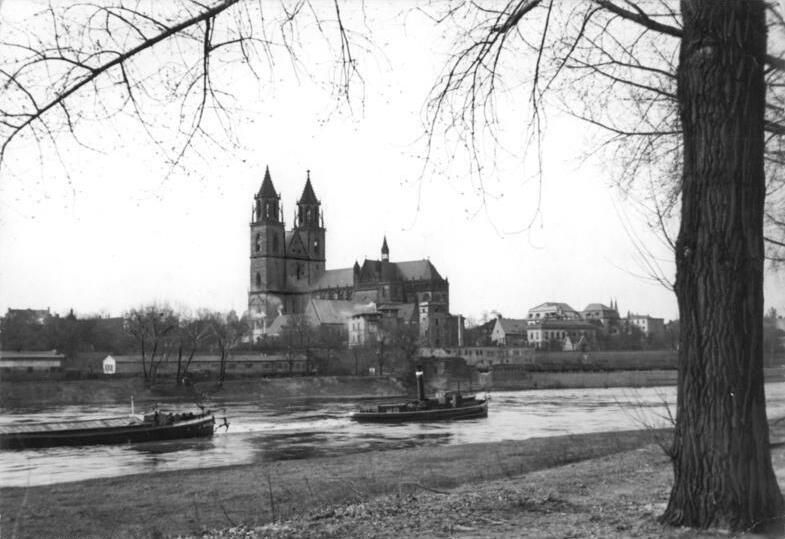
View of the area of the flooded Domfelsen in April 1954 from the east bank of the Elbe - shipping passes the Domfelsen to the east

The Domfelsen is a rock formation near Magdeburg Cathedral, part of which juts out into the River Elbe in Germany. The name means "Cathedral Rocks"

== Geology ==
The Domfelsen consists mainly of sandstone with a small proportion of siltstone. The rock is part of the rotliegendes formation and thus dates to the Lower Permian period. This outcrop of bedrock may be viewed as a continuation of the Flechtingen Hills which, in the urban area of Magdeburg, are mostly covered by a thin layer of Quaternary depositions.

== Significance ==
The rocks are of particular significance for river navigation on the Elbe and also for the river's ecosystem. The rocks, which are clearly visible on the west bank below the cathedral when water levels are low, affect local current conditions. Even in high water, ships can only pass down the river by sailing close to the eastern bank. Commercial shipping is not allowed to cross at this point; traffic is regulated remotely by a light system. The speed of the current in the Elbe is considerably higher at this point due to the narrowing of the river. Low-powered, motorised barges can therefore only make their way upstream here with the aid of a tug.

Historically, the rocks were important because it was likely that a ford had been created here by the Elbe, which could eventually have resulted in the settlement that led to the city of Magdeburg growing up on its present site.

The Domfelsen was chosen as the site of the cathedral because it had a firmer foundation than the surrounding land. Because the rocks in the river are only exposed at low water levels, which are associated with drought and poor harvest, they were also nicknamed the Hungerfelsen by the local population.

The Domfelsen is accessible on foot from the west bank at low water. A staircase built in the summer of 2007 improves access to the rocks considerably. On the landward side, the remains of the Southern Railway Fortress Gate (Südliches Eisenbahnfestungstor) rise over the Domfelsen.

== Removal plans ==
The authorities responsible for river navigation repeatedly put forward proposals to remove the rocks from the river in order to improve navigation for shipping. A citizens' initiative, Pro Elbe, is opposed to such attempts. Apart from fears of the impact on water levels in the floodplains, especially upriver, opponents criticize the removal of the rock, which is seen as the first step of the ecologically controversial and unapproved expansion of the River Saale.

Fears that work on Domfelsen could affect the stability of the Magdeburg Cathedral have not been confirmed by recent work.
