= Loitsche-Heinrichsberg =

- Municipality
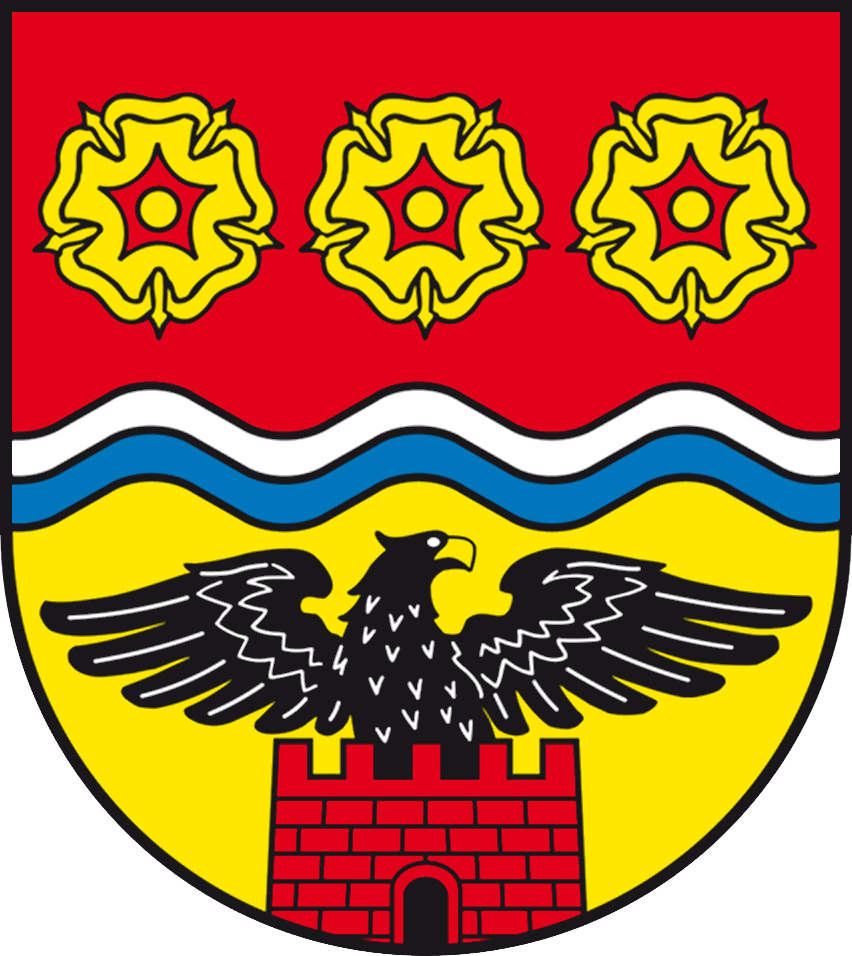
- Coat of arms

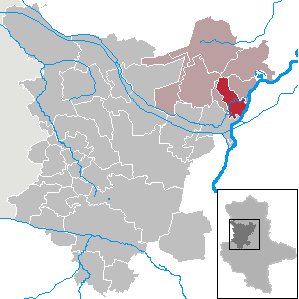
- Location of Loitsche-Heinrichsberg within Börde district
- Interactive map of Loitsche-Heinrichsberg
- Location within Germany Location within Saxony-Anhalt
- Coordinates: 52°17′N 11°43′E
- Country: Germany
- State: Saxony-Anhalt
- District: Börde
- Municipal assoc.: Elbe-Heide

Government
  - Mayor (2023–30): Bettina Roggisch

Area
  - Total: 30.77 km^{2} (11.88 sq mi)
- Elevation: 40 m (130 ft)

Population (2025-12-31)
  - Total: 917
  - Density: 29.8/km^{2} (77.2/sq mi)
- Time zone: UTC+01:00 (CET)
  - Summer (DST): UTC+02:00 (CEST)
- Postal codes: 39326
- Dialling codes: 039208
- Vehicle registration: BK, OK
- Website: www.elbe-heide.de

Loitsche-Heinrichsberg is a municipality in the Börde district in Saxony-Anhalt, Germany. It was formed on 1 January 2010 by the merger of the former municipalities Loitsche and Heinrichsberg.
