= Burgstall, Saxony-Anhalt =

Burgstall
- Municipality
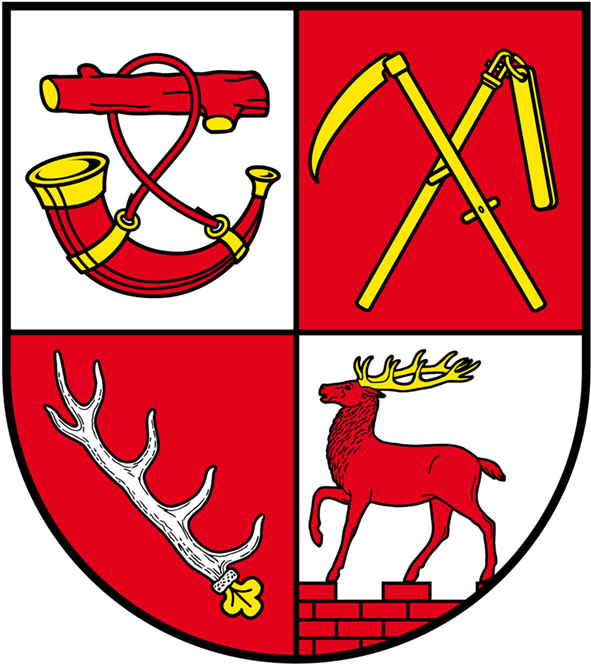
- Coat of arms

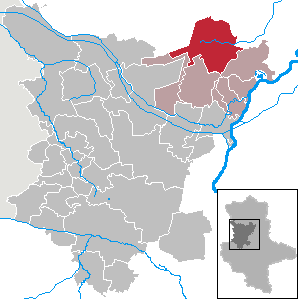
- Location of Burgstall within Börde district
- Interactive map of Burgstall
- Location within Germany Location within Saxony-Anhalt
- Coordinates: 52°25′N 11°41′E
- Country: Germany
- State: Saxony-Anhalt
- District: Börde
- Municipal assoc.: Elbe-Heide

Government
  - Mayor (2022–29): Carsten Miehe

Area
  - Total: 116.45 km^{2} (44.96 sq mi)
- Elevation: 45 m (148 ft)

Population (2025-12-31)
  - Total: 1,440
  - Density: 12.4/km^{2} (32.0/sq mi)
- Time zone: UTC+01:00 (CET)
  - Summer (DST): UTC+02:00 (CEST)
- Postal codes: 39517
- Dialling codes: 039364
- Vehicle registration: BK
- Website: www.elbe-heide.de

Burgstall (German pronunciation: [ˈbʊʁkˌʃtal]) is a municipality in the Börde district in Saxony-Anhalt, Germany. On 1 January 2010 it absorbed the former municipalities Cröchern, Dolle and Sandbeiendorf. The municipality consists of the Ortsteile (municipal divisions) Blätz, Burgstall, Cröchern, Dolle and Sandbeiendorf.

Between 1345 and 1562, Burgstall was owned by the Bismarck family.
