= Harbke =

- Municipality
- Coat of arms

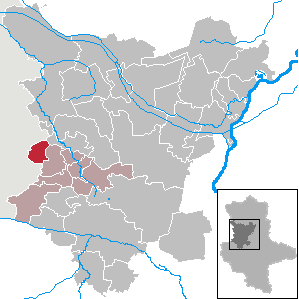
- Location of Harbke within Börde district
- Interactive map of Harbke
- Location within Germany Location within Saxony-Anhalt
- Coordinates: 52°11′N 11°3′E
- Country: Germany
- State: Saxony-Anhalt
- District: Börde
- Municipal assoc.: Obere Aller

Government
  - Mayor (2023–30): Werner Müller

Area
  - Total: 18.92 km^{2} (7.31 sq mi)
- Elevation: 137 m (449 ft)

Population (2025-12-31)
  - Total: 1,713
  - Density: 90.54/km^{2} (234.5/sq mi)
- Time zone: UTC+01:00 (CET)
  - Summer (DST): UTC+02:00 (CEST)
- Postal codes: 39365
- Dialling codes: 039406
- Vehicle registration: BK
- Website: www.obere-aller.de

Harbke is a municipality in the Börde district in Saxony-Anhalt, Germany.
