= Oschersleben (Verwaltungsgemeinschaft) =

Municipality in Saxony-Anhalt, Germany

Coordinates: 52°01′N 11°15′E

Oschersleben (Bode) is a former Verwaltungsgemeinschaft ("collective municipality") in the district of Börde, in Saxony-Anhalt, Germany. The seat of the Verwaltungsgemeinschaft was in Oschersleben. It was disbanded in September 2010.

The Verwaltungsgemeinschaft Oschersleben consisted of the following municipalities:

1. Hadmersleben
2. Oschersleben
