= Flechtingen (Verbandsgemeinde) =

Municipality in Germany

- Verbandsgemeinde
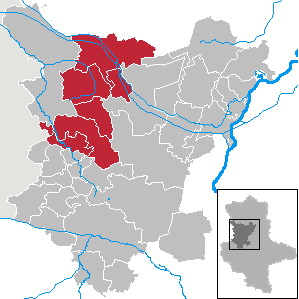
- Map of Börde highlighting Flechtingen
- Interactive map of Flechtingen
- Location within Germany Location within Saxony-Anhalt
- Coordinates: 52°20′N 11°15′E
- Country: Germany
- State: Saxony-Anhalt
- District: Börde
- Seat: Flechtingen
- Subdivisions: 7 municipalities

Area
  - Total: 385.73 km^{2} (148.93 sq mi)

Population (2025-12-31)
  - Total: 12,339
  - Density: 31.989/km^{2} (82.850/sq mi)
- Time zone: UTC+01:00 (CET)
  - Summer (DST): UTC+02:00 (CEST)
- Website: www.verbandsgemeinde-flechtingen.de

Flechtingen is a Verbandsgemeinde (association municipality) in the Börde district, in Saxony-Anhalt, Germany. Before 1 January 2010, it was a Verwaltungsgemeinschaft. The seat of the Verbandsgemeinde is in Flechtingen, with branch offices in Calvörde and Erxleben.

The Verbandsgemeinde Flechtingen consists of the following municipalities:

1. Altenhausen
2. Beendorf
3. Bülstringen
4. Calvörde
5. Erxleben
6. Flechtingen
7. Ingersleben
