= Bülstringen =

- Municipality
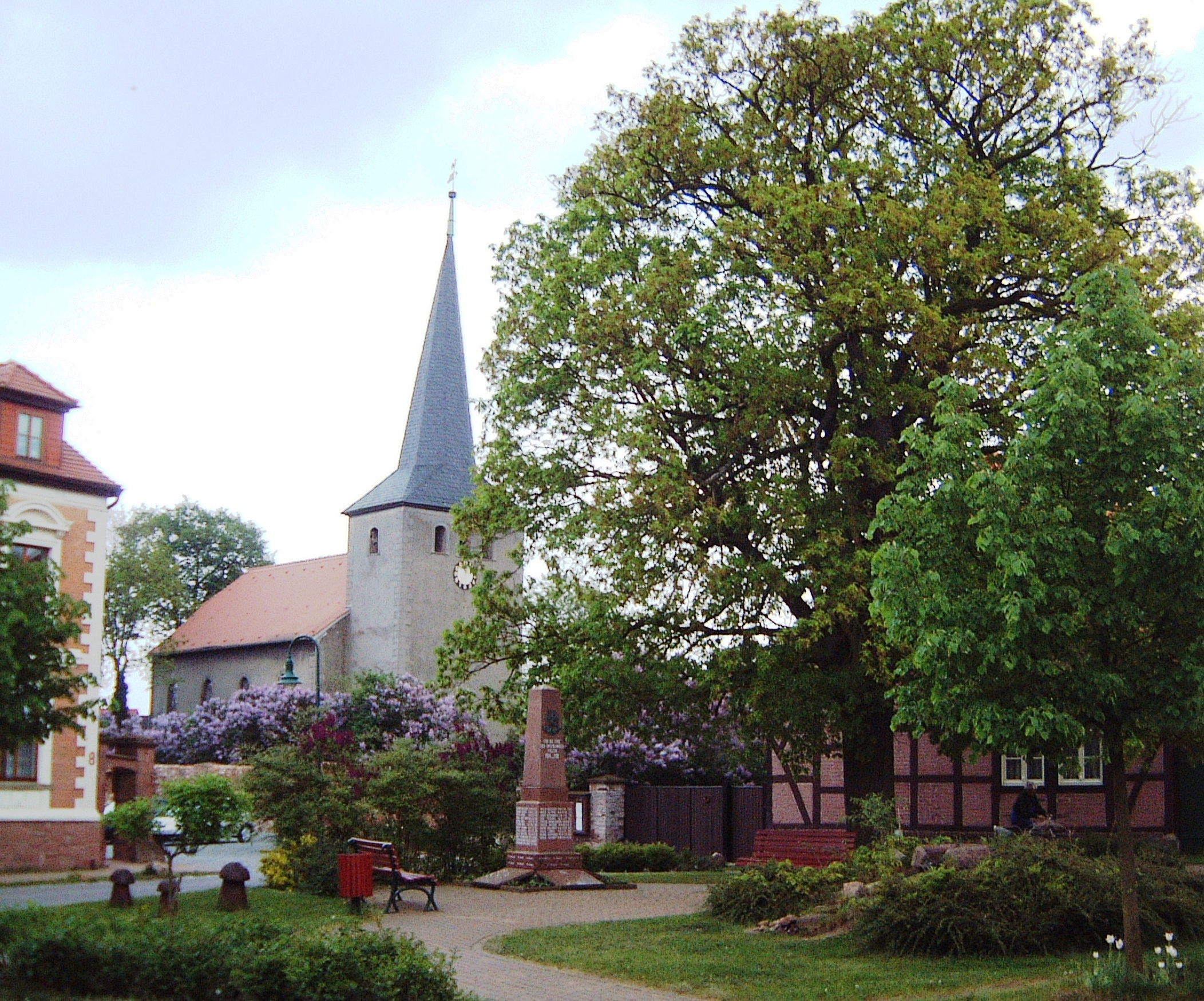

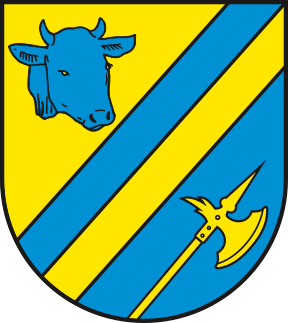
- Coat of arms

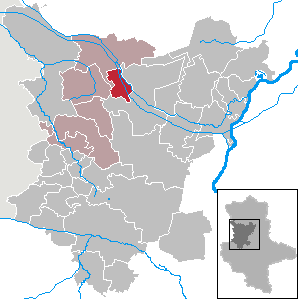
- Location of Bülstringen within Börde district
- Interactive map of Bülstringen
- Location within Germany Location within Saxony-Anhalt
- Coordinates: 52°19′N 11°21′E
- Country: Germany
- State: Saxony-Anhalt
- District: Börde
- Municipal assoc.: Flechtingen

Government
  - Mayor (2022–29): Sven Fahrenfeld

Area
  - Total: 25.42 km^{2} (9.81 sq mi)
- Elevation: 53 m (174 ft)

Population (2025-12-31)
  - Total: 870
  - Density: 34/km^{2} (89/sq mi)
- Time zone: UTC+01:00 (CET)
  - Summer (DST): UTC+02:00 (CEST)
- Postal codes: 39345
- Dialling codes: 039058
- Vehicle registration: BK
- Website: www.buelstringen.de

Bülstringen is a municipality in the Börde district in Saxony-Anhalt, Germany. On 1 January 2010 it absorbed the former municipality Wieglitz.
