= Beendorf =

- Municipality
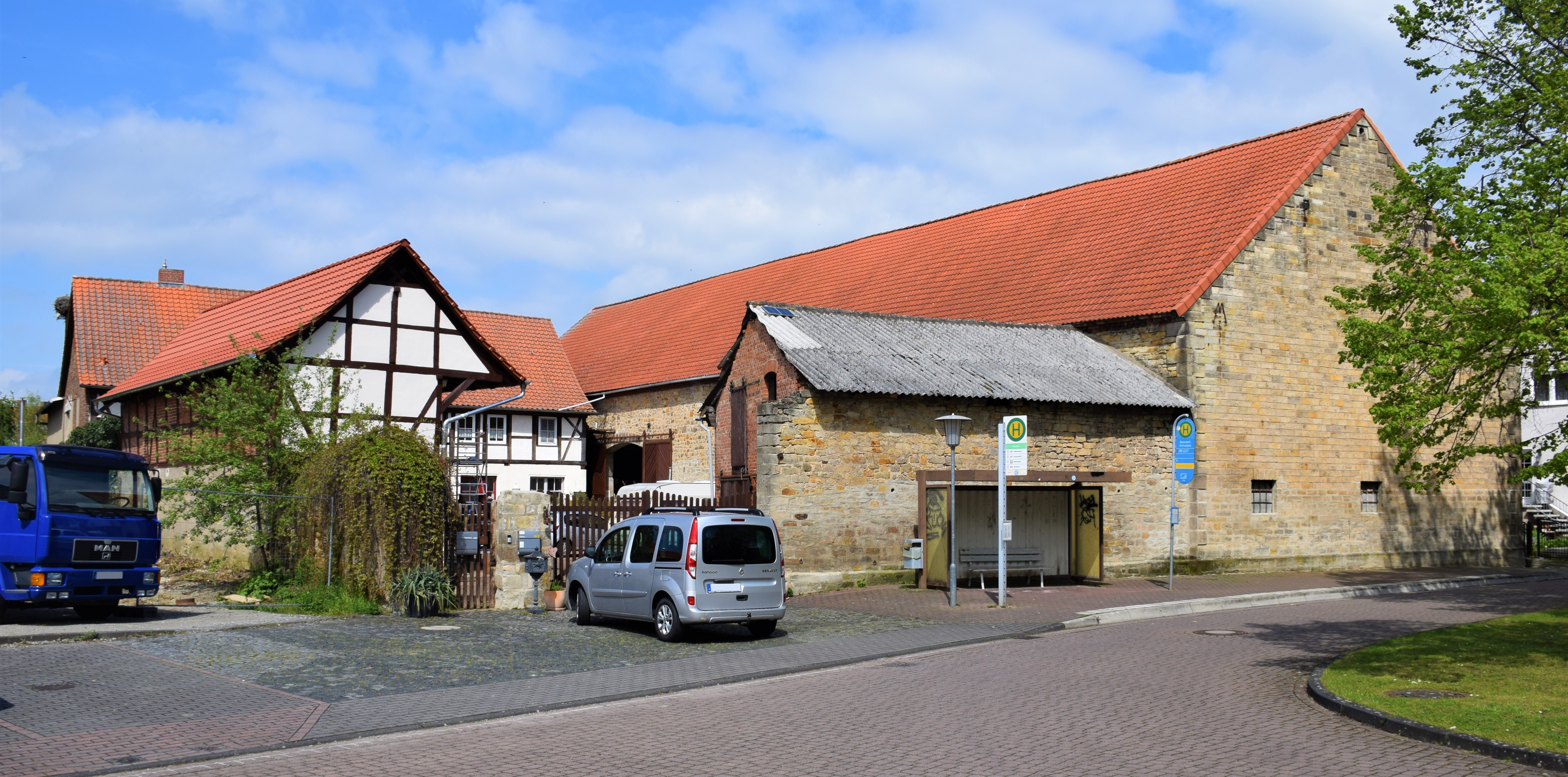

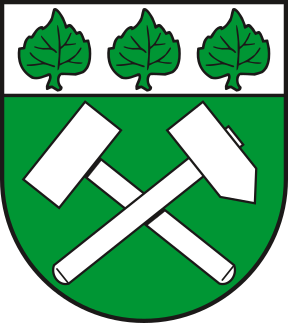
- Coat of arms

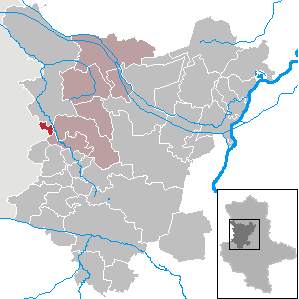
- Location of Beendorf within Börde district
- Interactive map of Beendorf
- Location within Germany Location within Saxony-Anhalt
- Coordinates: 52°14′32″N 11°5′16″E
- Country: Germany
- State: Saxony-Anhalt
- District: Börde
- Municipal assoc.: Flechtingen

Government
  - Mayor (2019–26): Hagen Friedrichs

Area
  - Total: 6.83 km^{2} (2.64 sq mi)
- Elevation: 130 m (430 ft)

Population (2025-12-31)
  - Total: 805
  - Density: 118/km^{2} (305/sq mi)
- Time zone: UTC+01:00 (CET)
  - Summer (DST): UTC+02:00 (CEST)
- Postal codes: 39343
- Dialling codes: 039050
- Vehicle registration: BK

Beendorf (German pronunciation: [ˈbeːndɔʁf]) is a municipality in the Börde district in Saxony-Anhalt, Germany.

== History ==
During World War II, a concentration camp was established in Beendorf. It was a subcamp to the Neuengamme concentration camp. From February 1944 until April 1945, about 2,500 women were forced to work in a pit. It was part of the armament factories for the German Luftwaffe.
