= Flechtingen =

- Municipality
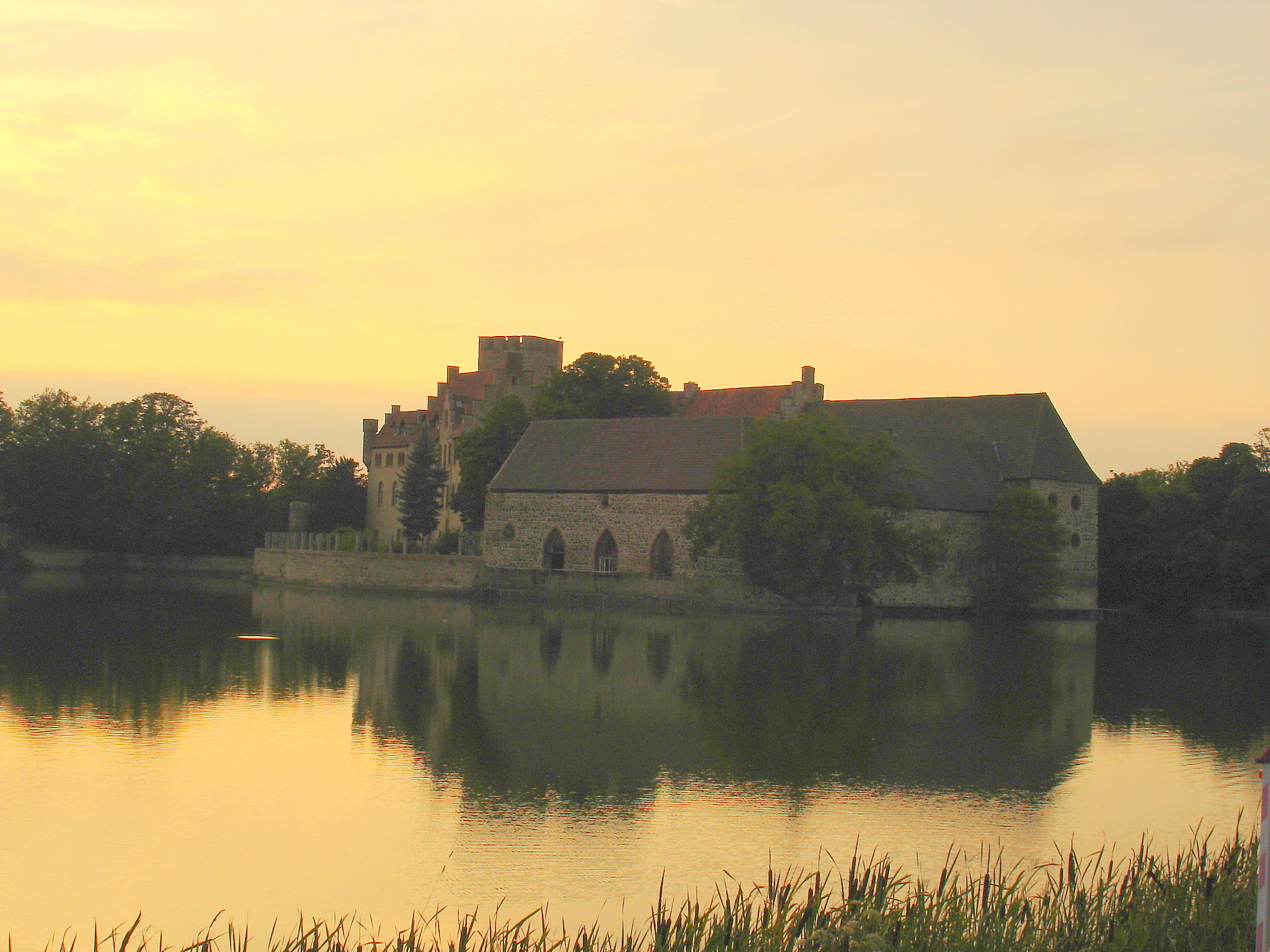
- Water citadel in Flechtingen

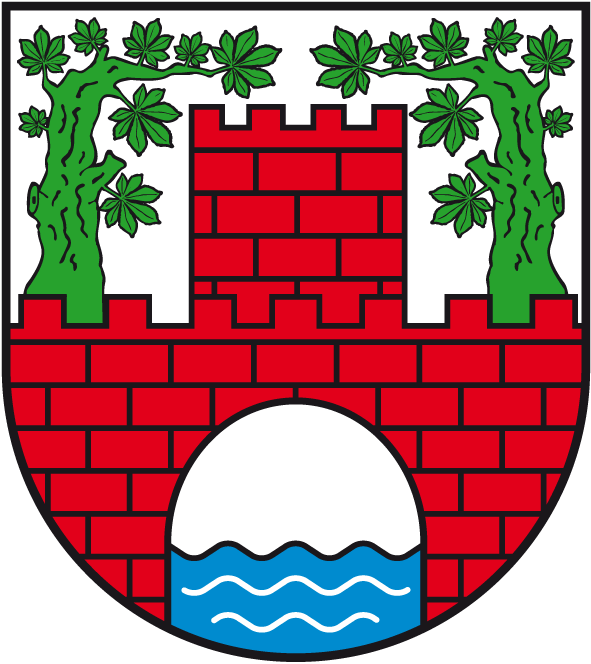
- Coat of arms

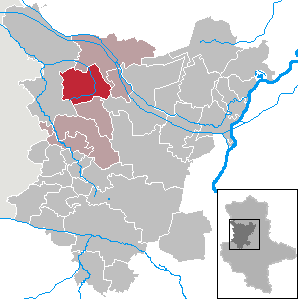
- Location of Flechtingen within Börde district
- Interactive map of Flechtingen
- Location within Germany Location within Saxony-Anhalt
- Coordinates: 52°19′52″N 11°14′29″E
- Country: Germany
- State: Saxony-Anhalt
- District: Börde
- Municipal assoc.: Flechtingen
- Subdivisions: 8

Government
  - Mayor (2022–29): Mirko Buttgereit

Area
  - Total: 73.52 km^{2} (28.39 sq mi)
- Elevation: 92 m (302 ft)

Population (2025-12-31)
  - Total: 2,646
  - Density: 35.99/km^{2} (93.21/sq mi)
- Time zone: UTC+01:00 (CET)
  - Summer (DST): UTC+02:00 (CEST)
- Postal codes: 39345, 39356, 39359
- Dialling codes: 039054, 039055
- Vehicle registration: BK
- Website: luftkurortflechtingen.de

Flechtingen is a municipality in the Börde district in Saxony-Anhalt, Germany. It is situated approximately 35 km towards northwest of Magdeburg. On 1 January 2010, it absorbed the former municipalities Behnsdorf, Belsdorf and Böddensell.

Flechtingen is the seat of the Verbandsgemeinde ("collective municipality") Flechtingen.
