= Behnsdorf =

- Ortsteil of Flechtingen
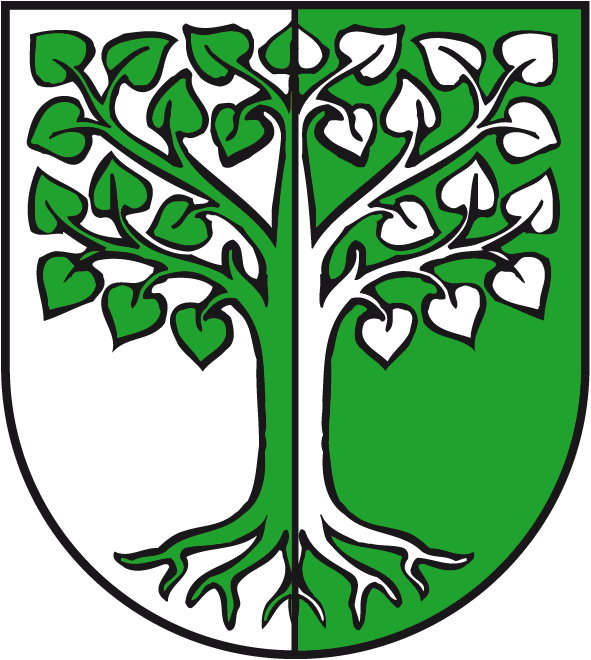
- Coat of arms
- Interactive map of Behnsdorf
- Location within Germany Location within Saxony-Anhalt
- Coordinates: 52°19′N 11°9′E
- Country: Germany
- State: Saxony-Anhalt
- District: Börde
- Municipality: Flechtingen

Area
  - Total: 13.86 km^{2} (5.35 sq mi)
- Elevation: 137 m (449 ft)

Population (2006-12-31)
  - Total: 657
  - Density: 47.4/km^{2} (123/sq mi)
- Time zone: UTC+01:00 (CET)
  - Summer (DST): UTC+02:00 (CEST)
- Postal codes: 39356
- Dialling codes: 039055
- Vehicle registration: BK

Behnsdorf (German pronunciation: [ˈbeːnsdɔʁf]) is a village and a former municipality in the Börde district in Saxony-Anhalt, Germany.

Since 1 January 2010, it is part of the municipality Flechtingen.
