= Völpke =

- Municipality
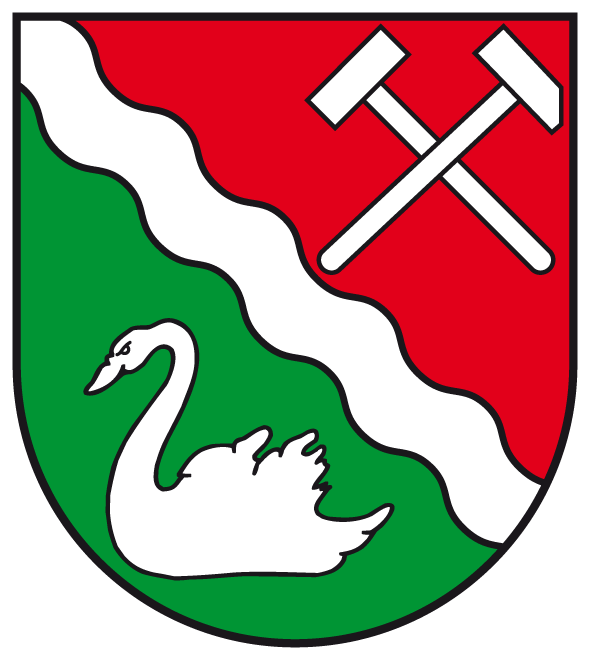
- Coat of arms

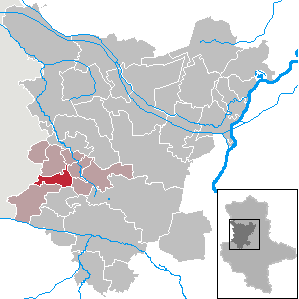
- Location of Völpke within Börde district
- Interactive map of Völpke
- Location within Germany Location within Saxony-Anhalt
- Coordinates: 52°8′12″N 11°5′42″E
- Country: Germany
- State: Saxony-Anhalt
- District: Börde
- Municipal assoc.: Obere Aller

Government
  - Mayor (2019–26): Kai Bögelsack

Area
  - Total: 17.22 km^{2} (6.65 sq mi)
- Elevation: 149 m (489 ft)

Population (2025-12-31)
  - Total: 1,067
  - Density: 61.96/km^{2} (160.5/sq mi)
- Time zone: UTC+01:00 (CET)
  - Summer (DST): UTC+02:00 (CEST)
- Postal codes: 39393
- Dialling codes: 039402
- Vehicle registration: BK

Völpke is a municipality in the Börde district in Saxony-Anhalt, Germany. Völpke has a population of 1,230 (as of 2020).
