= Ummendorf, Saxony-Anhalt =

Ummendorf
- Municipality
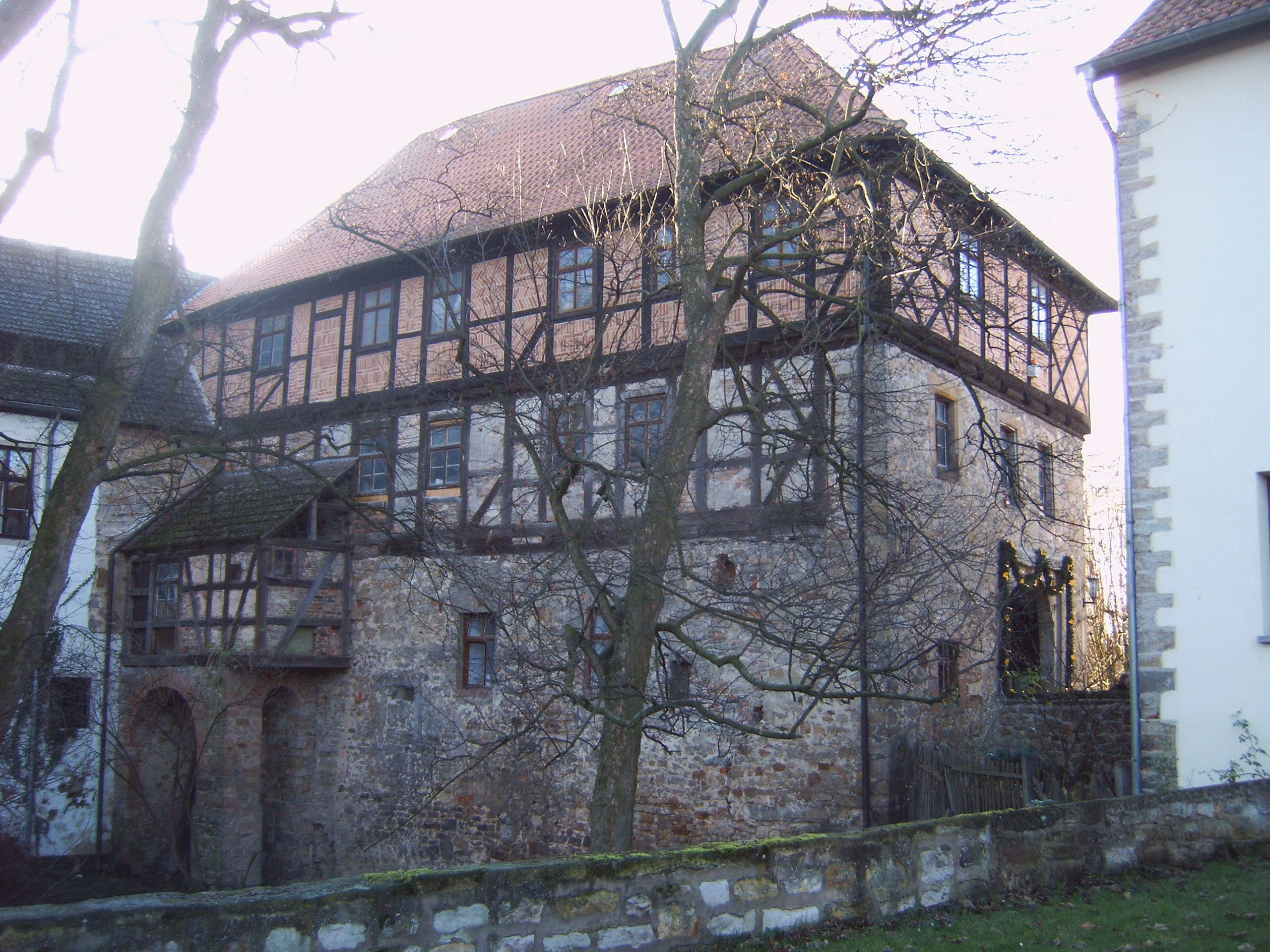

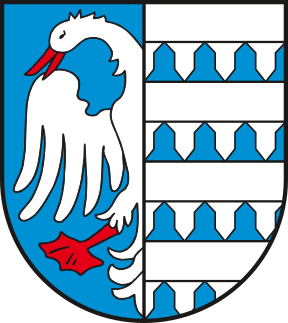
- Coat of arms

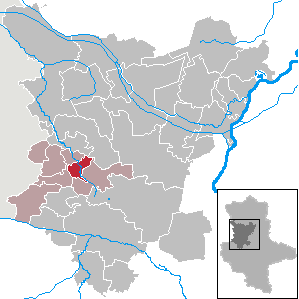
- Location of Ummendorf within Börde district
- Interactive map of Ummendorf
- Location within Germany Location within Saxony-Anhalt
- Coordinates: 52°9′11″N 11°10′59″E
- Country: Germany
- State: Saxony-Anhalt
- District: Börde
- Municipal assoc.: Obere Aller

Government
  - Mayor (2022–29): Reinhard Falke

Area
  - Total: 15.68 km^{2} (6.05 sq mi)
- Elevation: 134 m (440 ft)

Population (2025-12-31)
  - Total: 929
  - Density: 59.2/km^{2} (153/sq mi)
- Time zone: UTC+01:00 (CET)
  - Summer (DST): UTC+02:00 (CEST)
- Postal codes: 39365
- Dialling codes: 039409
- Vehicle registration: BK
- Website: www.ummendorf-boerde.de

Ummendorf (German pronunciation: [ˈʊməndɔʁf]) is a municipality in the Börde district in Saxony-Anhalt, Germany.
