= Eilsleben =

- Municipality
- Coat of arms

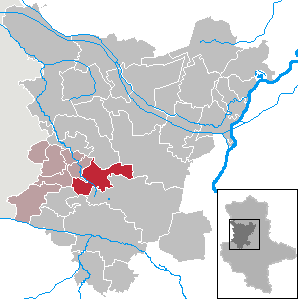
- Location of Eilsleben within Börde district
- Interactive map of Eilsleben
- Location within Germany Location within Saxony-Anhalt
- Coordinates: 52°9′N 11°13′E
- Country: Germany
- State: Saxony-Anhalt
- District: Börde
- Municipal assoc.: Obere Aller

Government
  - Mayor (2022–29): Matthias Finke

Area
  - Total: 55.61 km^{2} (21.47 sq mi)
- Elevation: 148 m (486 ft)

Population (2025-12-31)
  - Total: 3,509
  - Density: 63.10/km^{2} (163.4/sq mi)
- Time zone: UTC+01:00 (CET)
  - Summer (DST): UTC+02:00 (CEST)
- Postal codes: 39365
- Dialling codes: 039409
- Vehicle registration: BK

Eilsleben is a municipality in the Börde district in Saxony-Anhalt, Germany. In January 2010 it absorbed the former municipality Wormsdorf and in September 2010 the former municipalities Drackenstedt, Druxberge and Ovelgünne.
