= Börde (district) =

Coordinates: 52°10′N 11°20′E

- District
- Flag Coat of arms
- Country: Germany
- State: Saxony-Anhalt
- Capital: Haldensleben

Government
  - District admin.: Martin Stichnoth (CDU)

Area
  - Total: 2,367.2 km^{2} (914.0 sq mi)

Population (31 December 2025)
  - Total: 167,314
  - Density: 70.680/km^{2} (183.06/sq mi)
- Time zone: UTC+01:00 (CET)
  - Summer (DST): UTC+02:00 (CEST)
- Vehicle registration: BK, BÖ, HDL, OC, OK, WMS, WZL
- Website: www.landkreis-boerde.de

Börde (German: Landkreis Börde) is a district in Saxony-Anhalt in Germany. Its seat is the town Haldensleben. It takes its name from the natural region Magdeburg Börde. It is the site of the Morsleben radioactive waste repository. The disposal of waste into the facility ended in 1998.

== Geography ==
The Börde district covers the area west of the city of Magdeburg. With an area of 2,367.2 km^{2} (914.0 sq mi), it is the second-largest district of Saxony-Anhalt. It is bounded by (from the north and clockwise) the districts Altmarkkreis Salzwedel, Stendal, Jerichower Land, the city of Magdeburg, Salzlandkreis and Harz. To the west it borders the state of Lower Saxony. The main rivers are the Elbe in the northeast, the Ohre in the north, the Aller in the west and the Bode in the south.

== History ==
The district was formed with the merger the former districts of Ohrekreis and Bördekreis as part of the local-government reform of 2007. For its arms, a design based on the Hornhausen rider stone was chosen.

- Oschersleben, a former Verwaltungsgemeinschaft disbanded in 2010.

== Towns and municipalities ==
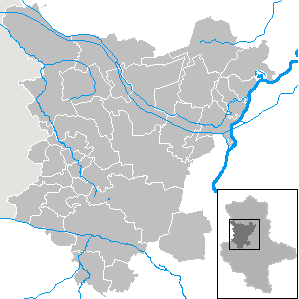
Clickable map of towns and municipalities in the district

The district Börde consists of the following subdivisions:

Free towns
1. Haldensleben
2. Oebisfelde-Weferlingen
3. Oschersleben
4. Wanzleben-Börde
5. Wolmirstedt
Free municipalities
1. Barleben
2. Hohe Börde
3. Niedere Börde
4. Sülzetal

Verbandsgemeinden with municipalities
1. Elbe-Heide; 1. Angern; 2. Burgstall; 3. Colbitz; 4. Loitsche-Heinrichsberg; 5. Rogätz^{1}; 6. Westheide; 7. Zielitz	2. Flechtingen; 1. Altenhausen; 2. Beendorf; 3. Bülstringen; 4. Calvörde; 5. Erxleben; 6. Flechtingen^{1}; 7. Ingersleben	3. Obere Aller; 1. Eilsleben^{1}; 2. Harbke; 3. Hötensleben; 4. Sommersdorf; 5. Ummendorf; 6. Völpke; 7. Wefensleben	4. Westliche Börde; 1. Am Großen Bruch; 2. Ausleben; 3. Gröningen^{1, 2}; 4. Kroppenstedt^{2}
^{1}seat of the Verbandsgemeinde; ^{2}town;

=== Other localities ===
- Glindenberg, village and former municipality
