= Walbeck, Börde =

Walbeck
- Stadtteil of Oebisfelde-Weferlingen
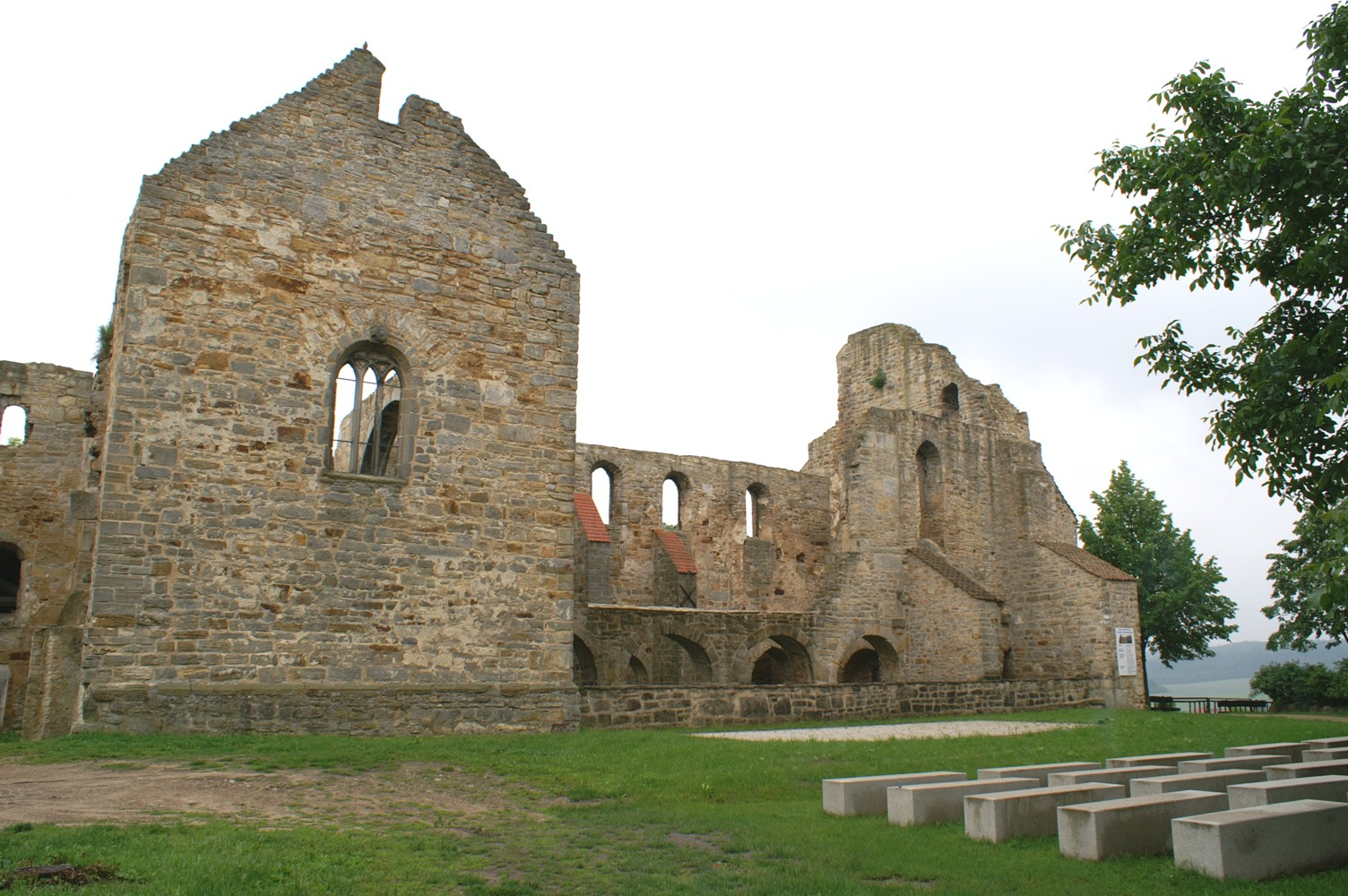
- Ruins of the abbey church

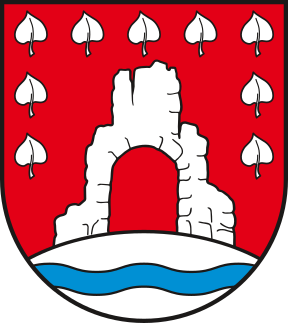
- Coat of arms
- Interactive map of Walbeck
- Location within Germany Location within Saxony-Anhalt
- Coordinates: 52°17′N 11°4′E
- Country: Germany
- State: Saxony-Anhalt
- District: Börde
- Town: Oebisfelde-Weferlingen

Area
  - Total: 14.61 km^{2} (5.64 sq mi)
- Elevation: 96 m (315 ft)

Population (2022)
  - Total: 688
  - Density: 47.1/km^{2} (122/sq mi)
- Time zone: UTC+01:00 (CET)
  - Summer (DST): UTC+02:00 (CEST)
- Postal codes: 39356
- Dialling codes: 039061
- Vehicle registration: BK

Walbeck (German pronunciation: [ˈvalbɛk]) is a village and a former municipality in the Börde district in Saxony-Anhalt, Germany. Since 1 January 2010, it is part of the town Oebisfelde-Weferlingen. Its population is 688 (2022).

== Geography ==
Walbeck is situated in the west of the Magdeburg Börde on the Aller River at the northeastern rim of the Lappwald hill range. It is located about 4 km (2.5 mi) south of Weferlingen, near the border with Helmstedt in the state of Lower Saxony. A nearby crack of karstic (Muschelkalk) galleries is the site of a significant fossil deposit with numerous traces of Paleocene mammals (Arctocyonidae) and birds.

With effect from 1 January 2010, Walbeck and the neighbouring municipalities of Oebisfelde, Bösdorf, Eickendorf, Etingen, Kathendorf, Rätzlingen, Eschenrode, Döhren, Hödingen, Hörsingen, Schwanefeld, Seggerde, Siestedt, and Weferlingen merged to form the new town of Oebisfelde-Weferlingen.

== Walbeck Abbey ==
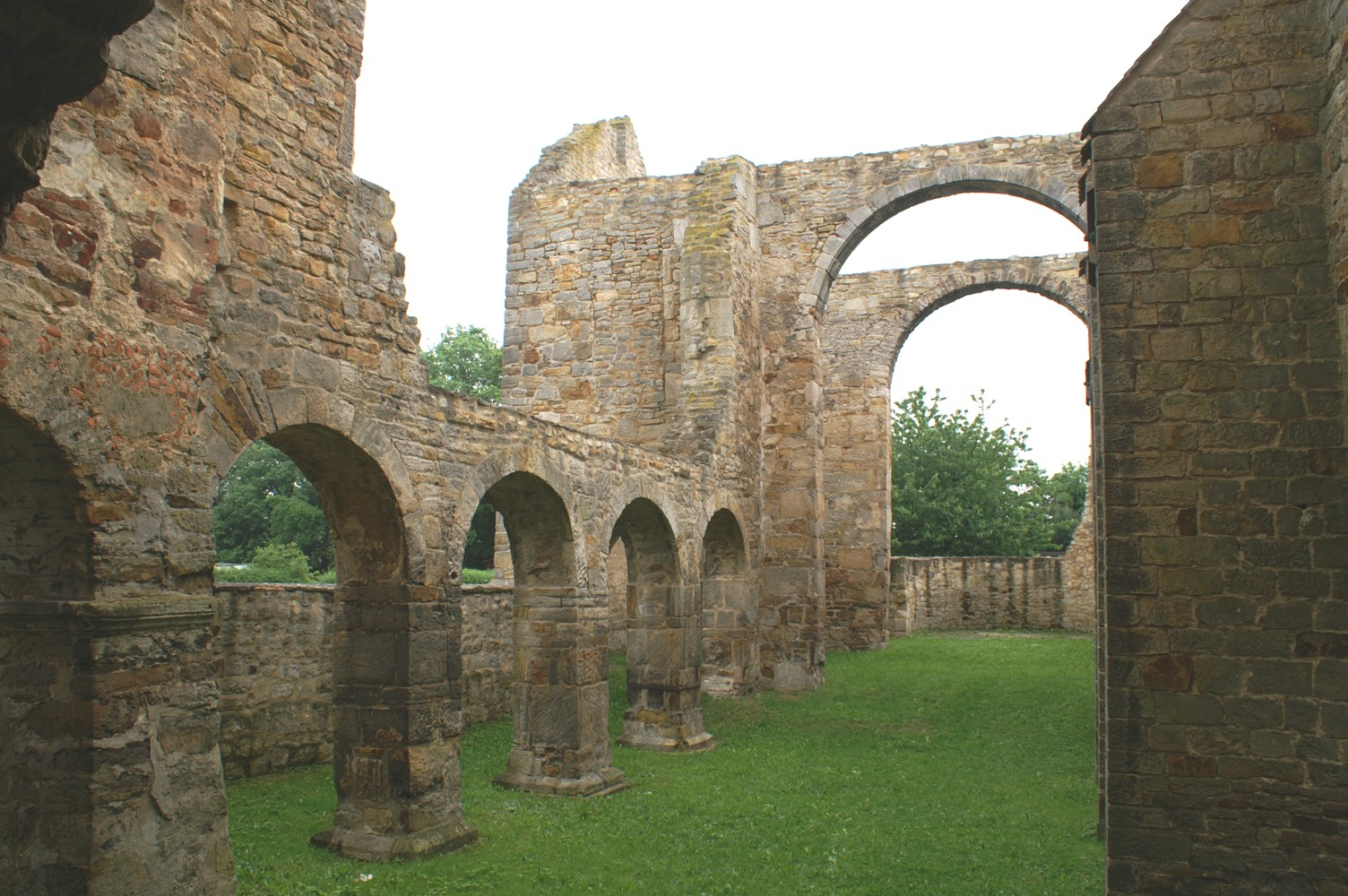
Church nave

Walbeck was first mentioned in 929, when the local Saxon count Lothair I was killed in a battle against the Polabian Slavs near Lenzen. In 942 his son Count Lothair II of Walbeck dedicated a house monastery at his residence, part of a reparation after he had been involved in a failed assassination attempt instigated by the Ottonian duke Henry I of Bavaria against his brother King Otto I. Lothair reached his pardon; his son Count Lothair III of Walbeck and his descendants served as margrave of the Northern March from about 983.

The most notable member of the canon-convent was the medieval chronicler Thietmar of Merseburg, a relative of the Walbeck counts and provost from 1002. Thietmar consecrated the abbey church in 1015, a church bell from these times (the Walbeck Bell), one of the earliest extant in Germany, is today part of the collections of the Bode Museum in Berlin. After the Counts Walbeck had become extinct, their residence was slighted and the convent came under control of the Halberstadt cathedral chapter in 1229.

The monastery turned Protestant in 1591. The premises decayed and in 1810 Walbeck Abbey was finally abolished. Today the ruins of the Ottonian monastery church are a stop on the Romanesque Road.

== Notable people ==
- Counts of Walbeck
- Ulrich Mühe (1953–2007), actor, died in Walbeck
