= Eschenrode =

- Stadtteil of Oebisfelde-Weferlingen
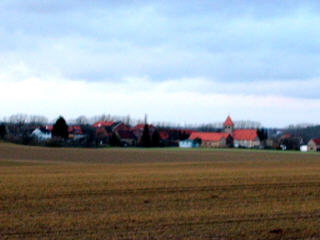

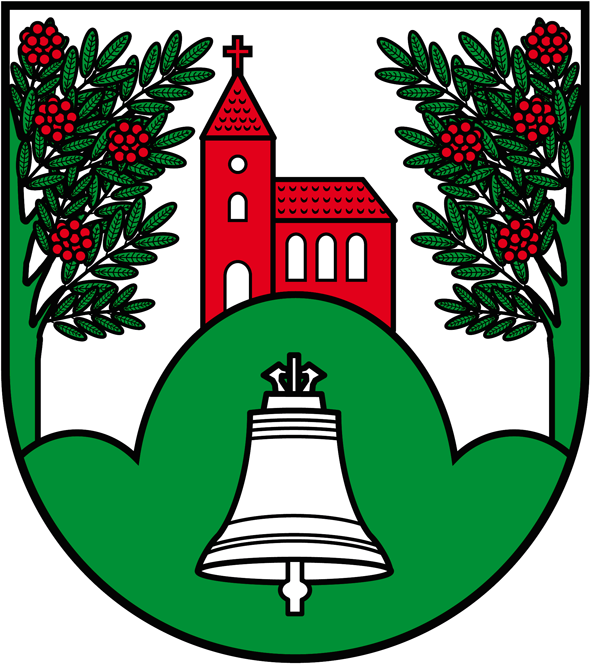
- Coat of arms
- Interactive map of Eschenrode
- Location within Germany Location within Saxony-Anhalt
- Coordinates: 52°17′N 11°7′E
- Country: Germany
- State: Saxony-Anhalt
- District: Börde
- Town: Oebisfelde-Weferlingen

Area
  - Total: 4.24 km^{2} (1.64 sq mi)
- Elevation: 133 m (436 ft)

Population (2011)
  - Total: 158
  - Density: 37.3/km^{2} (96.5/sq mi)
- Time zone: UTC+01:00 (CET)
  - Summer (DST): UTC+02:00 (CEST)
- Postal codes: 39356
- Dialling codes: 039055
- Vehicle registration: BK

Eschenrode is a village and a former municipality in the Börde district in Saxony-Anhalt, Germany. Since 1 January 2010, it is part of the town Oebisfelde-Weferlingen.

== Geography ==
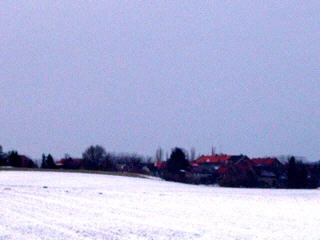
Eschenrode in winter

Eschenrode lies about 5 km southeast of Weferlingen, between Lappwald and the Flechtingen Hills. The nearest large towns are Braunschweig, Wolfsburg and Magdeburg.

It is surrounded on three sides by woods. Nearby lies the abandoned village of Nievoldhagen.

=== Neighbouring municipalities ===
These are: Hödingen, Hörsingen, Bartensleben, Schwanefeld, Walbeck and Weferlingen.

== History ==
The oldest mention of "Haskenroth" is in a confirmation document of the pope Hadrian IV for Mariental Abbey in 1158. Because the Eschenroder church dates from Hildegrim of Châlons († 827), traditionally the first bishop of the diocese of Halberstadt and said to have founded 35 parish churches, it is presumed clearly older than Eschenrode itself. The church became in the middle of the 11th century the archdeacons' church. The Halberstädter bishops beside the aristocratic own churches bishop subordinated directly Kirchenbezirke created. The church district of Eschenrode enclosed from Bartensleben to Grafhorst 22 churches. 1224 this was transferred Archdeacon Eschenrode of the Probstei Walbeck and lost to meaning.

=== Population ===
The number of residential buildings (54), has changed only slightly since 1842.

| Year | Population |
|---|---|
| 1910 | 353 |
| 1933 | 303 |
| 1939 | 284 |
| 1964 | 285 |
| 1971 | 265 |

| Year | Population |
|---|---|
| 1981 | 214 |
| 31.12.1985 | 199 |
| 31.12.1989 | 199 |
| 31.12.1990 | 192 |
| 1993 | 198 |

| Year | Population |
|---|---|
| 31.12.1995 | 183 |
| 31.12.2000 | 178 |
| 31.12.2001 | 176 |
| 31.12.2002 | 182 |
| 31.12.2003 | 169 |

| Year | Population |
|---|---|
| 31.12.2004 | 172 |
| 31.12.2005 | 173 |
| 31.12.2006 | 174 |
| 31.12.2007 | 167 |

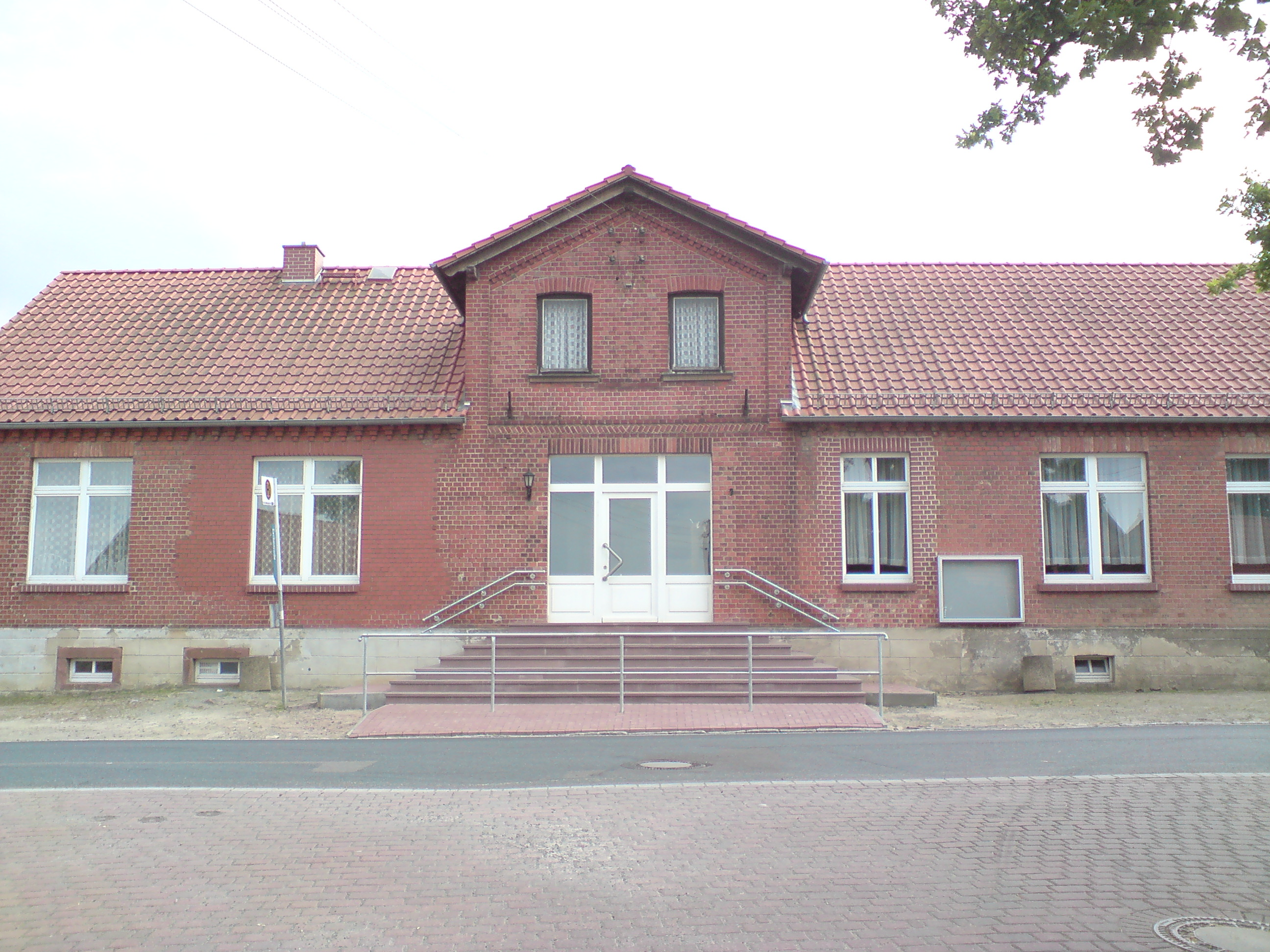
City hall

=== Partnerships ===
Eschenrode has a partnership with Lehre in Lower Saxony.

== Church ==
The local church is dedicated to Saint Stephen which has a rare Bodeorgel, a baptismal angel and a bell, which according to the Nievoldhagen legend, was found in the forest. Nievoldhagen was a settlement whose foundation walls of the former church, are all that remains.

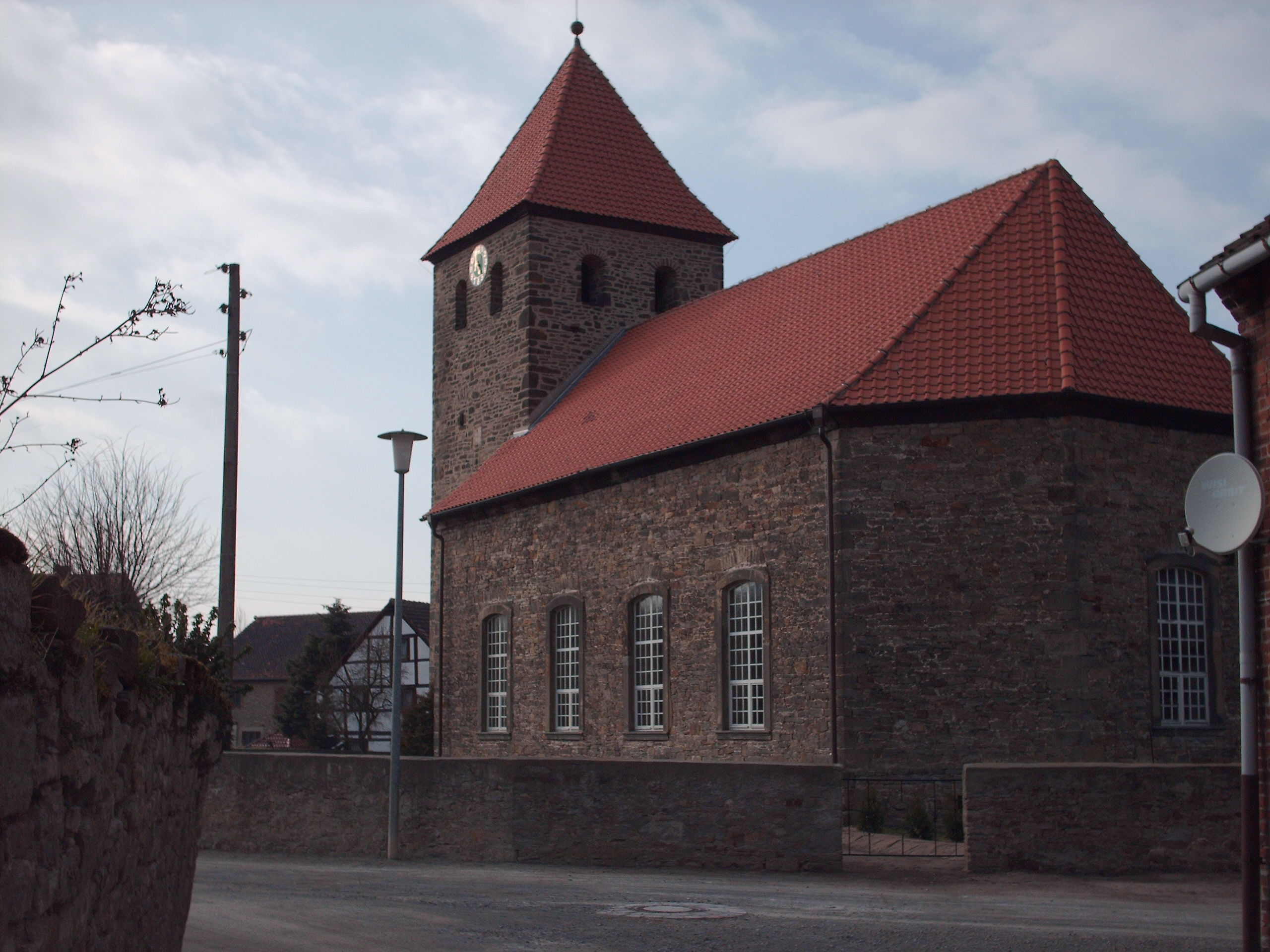
Eschenrode church

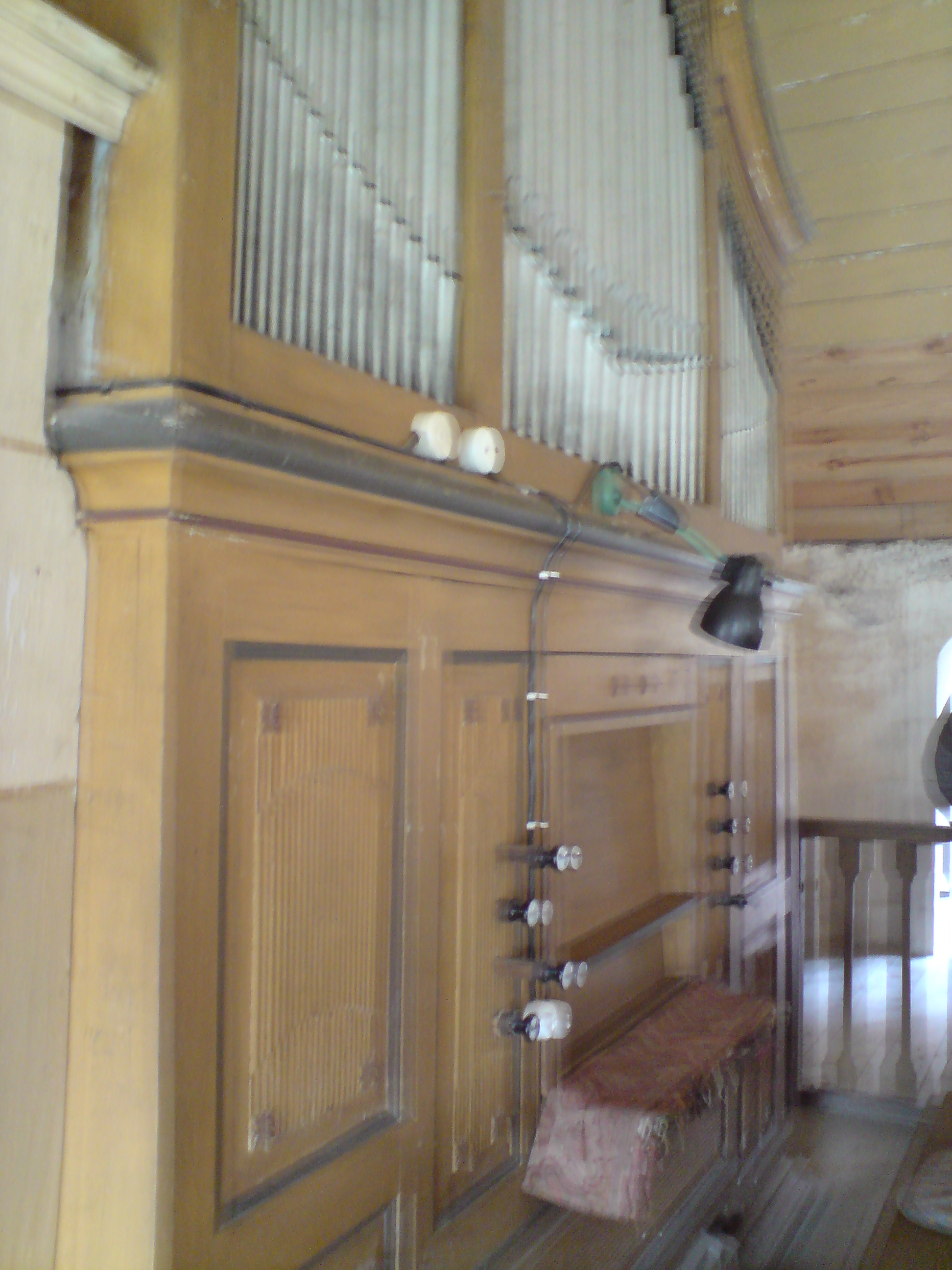
Bodeorgel

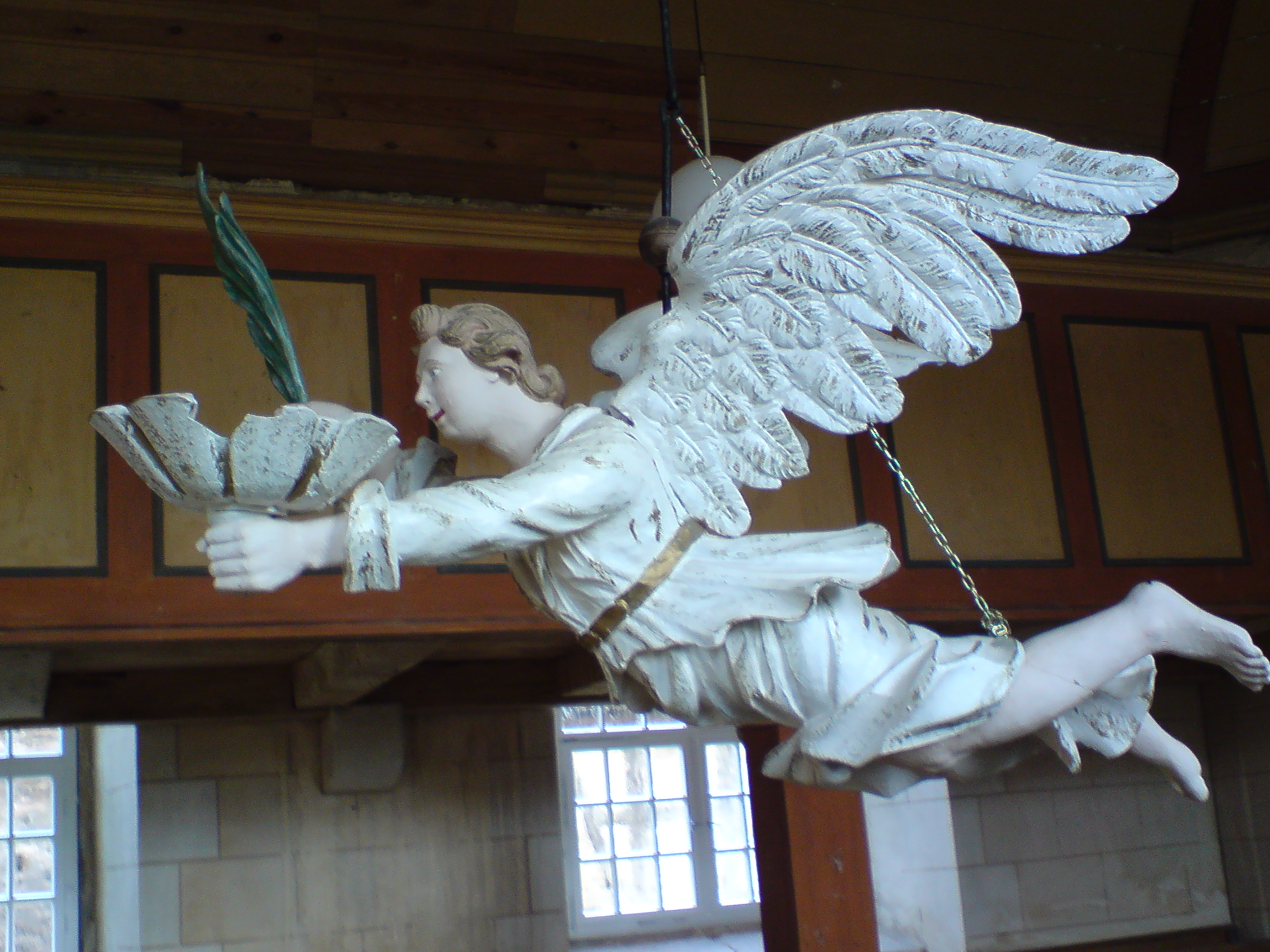
Baptismal Angel

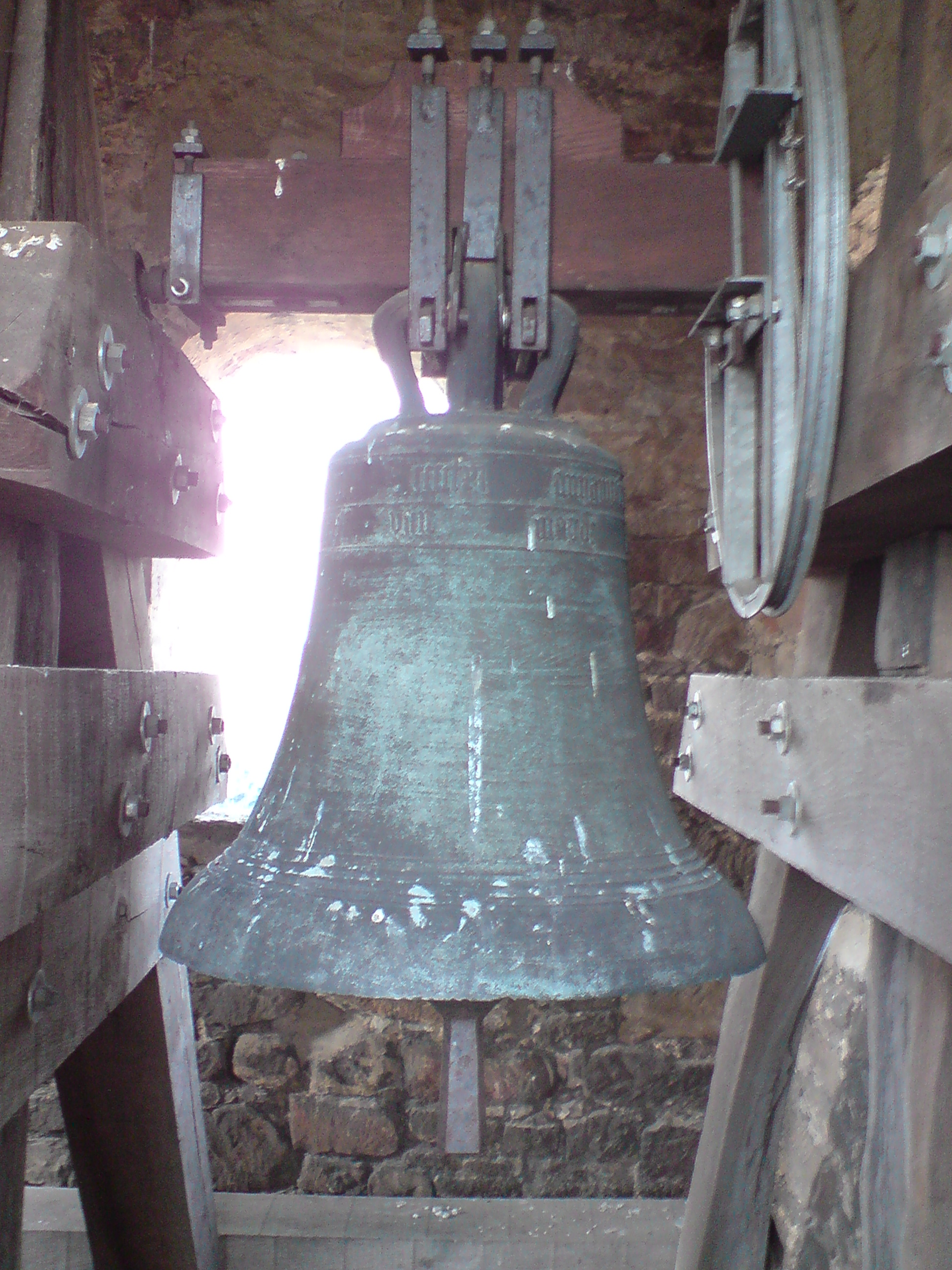
Nievoldhagenbell

== Transportation ==
Eschenrode is about 11 km from the B 1 which connects Braunschweig with Berlin. The nearest Autobahn is the A 2 which can be reached via the Alleringersleben exit (64), which is 14 km away.
