= Nievoldhagen =

Natural forest in Germany

Coordinates: 52.2983°N 11.1417°E

Nievoldhagen is an abandoned village in the Hödinger woods in Saxony-Anhalt in Germany. The settlement was destroyed by war during 16th century. The area is now a natural forest reserve.

== Location ==
Nievoldhagen is located in the woods between Behnsdorf, Eschenrode, Hödingen and Hörsingen. The route to the village was posted on the road from Behnsdorf to Hörsingen in 2006. The Nievoldhagen area is located in the Hödingen district, which politically belongs to the city of Oebisfelde-Weferlingen. A small part of the forest in which the village is located was designated as a natural forest area, which means that the forest is left to its own devices and is not managed.

== History ==
Nievoldhagen was a village settlement that was destroyed by a war. All that remains today is the foundation of the village church. The village was deserted in 1540 .

The inhabitants presumably got their water from the nearby Angerborn spring, a spring that still exists to this day. At present, the Nievoldhagen area is under the care of German forest services.

== The legend of Nievoldhagen ==
The legend of Nievoldhagen tells of a time when three swine herders from Eschenrode, Hörsingen and Behnsdorf shepherded their animals where the settlement used to be. One of the swines had uncovered the Nievoldhagen church bell while digging for food. The herders could not agree on whose swine it was that uncovered the bell, as the owner of this swine's village would keep the church bell. To settle their differences the herders agreed that whoever could transport the bell to their village first got to keep it. Each ran off towards their homes. The shepherd from Eschenrode caught a stroke of good luck and met a fellow villager with a carriage immediately upon exiting the woods. He told him what had happened and so the bell ended up in Eschenrode.

Today the bell still hangs alongside the two modern day church bells in the church of Eschenrode and sounds every day at six o'clock.

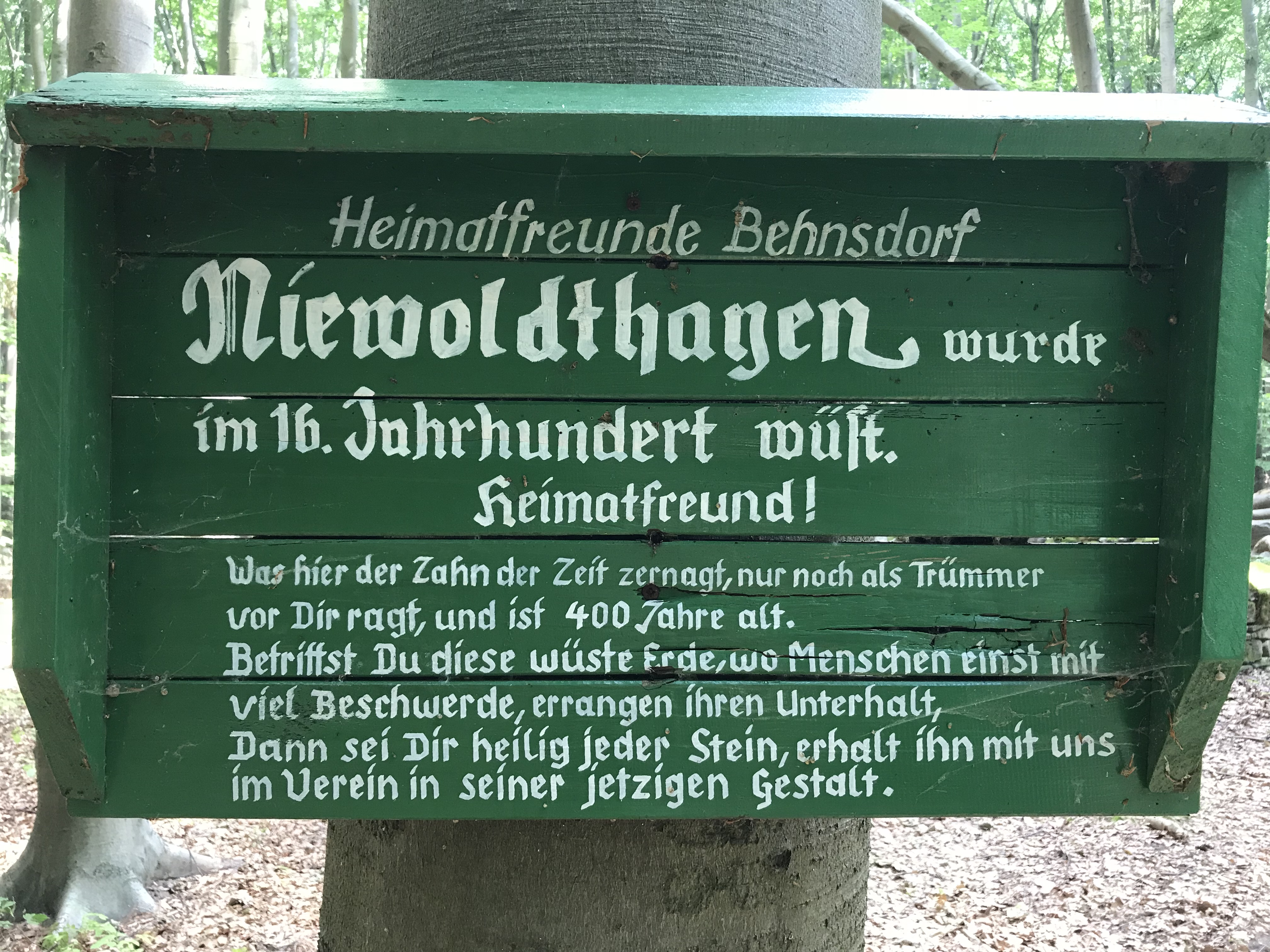
Plaque in front of the church ruins

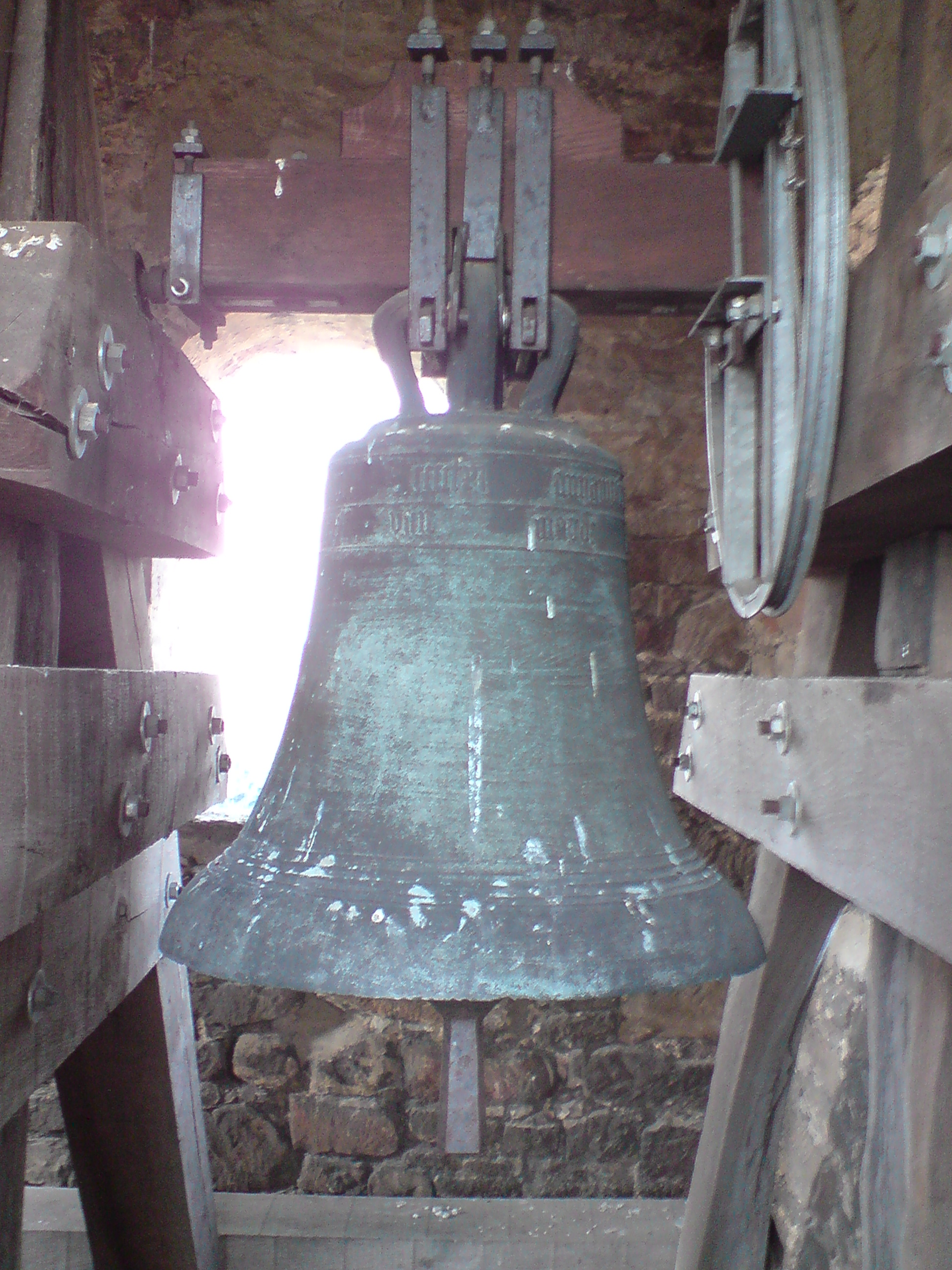
Nievoldhagen bell

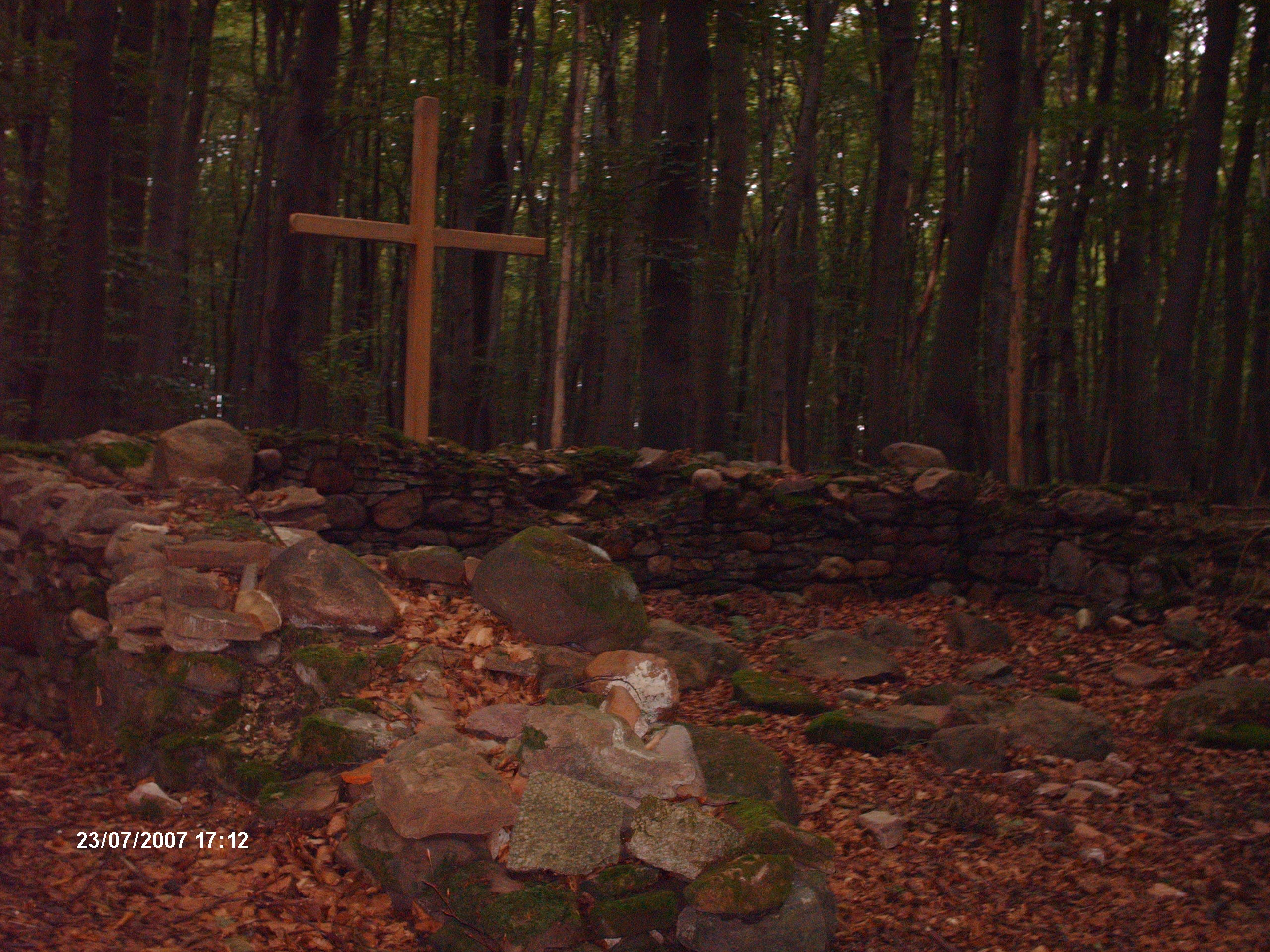
Church foundation wall

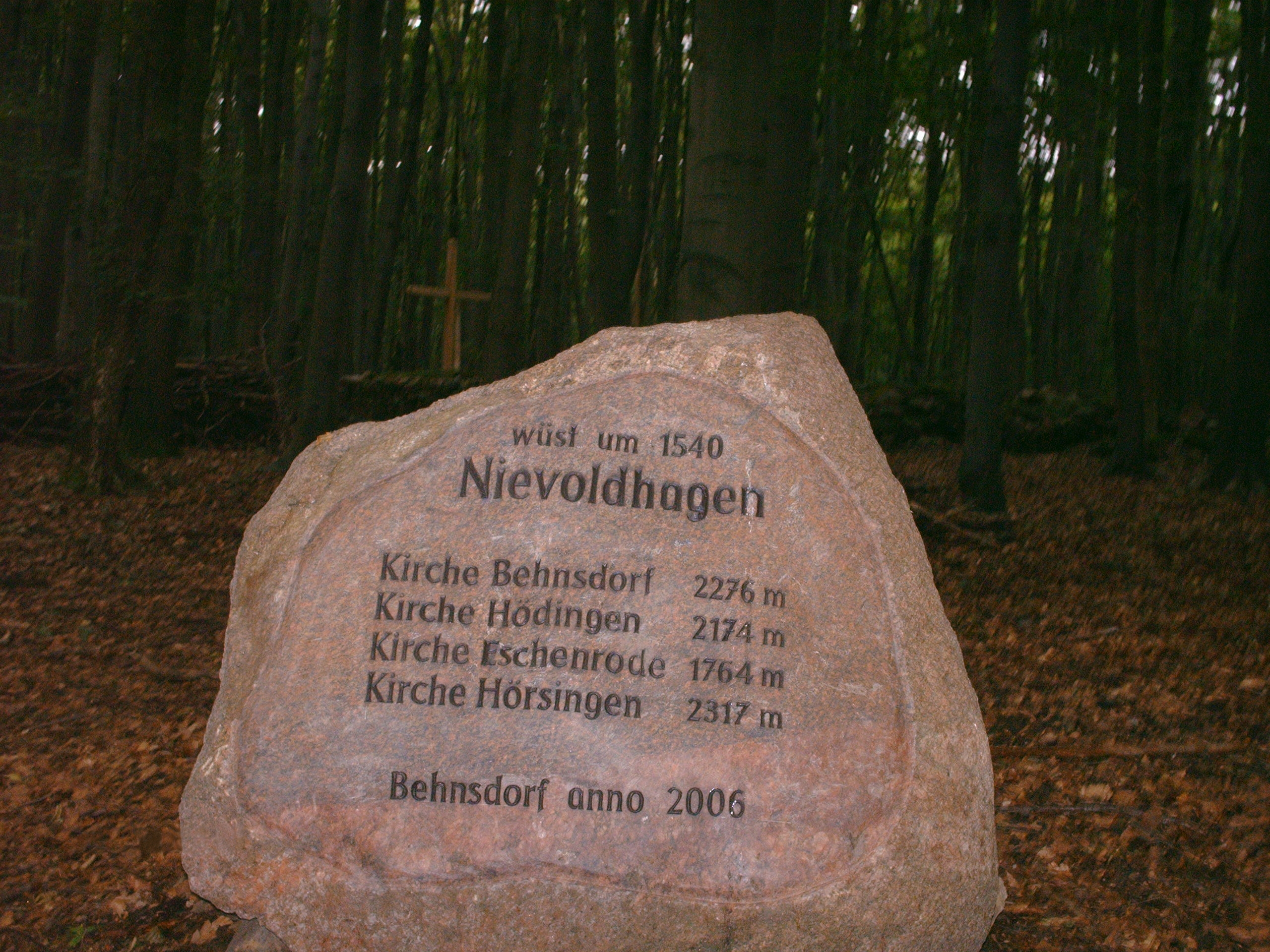
Stone with range measurements to the villages mentioned in the legend of Nievoldhagen

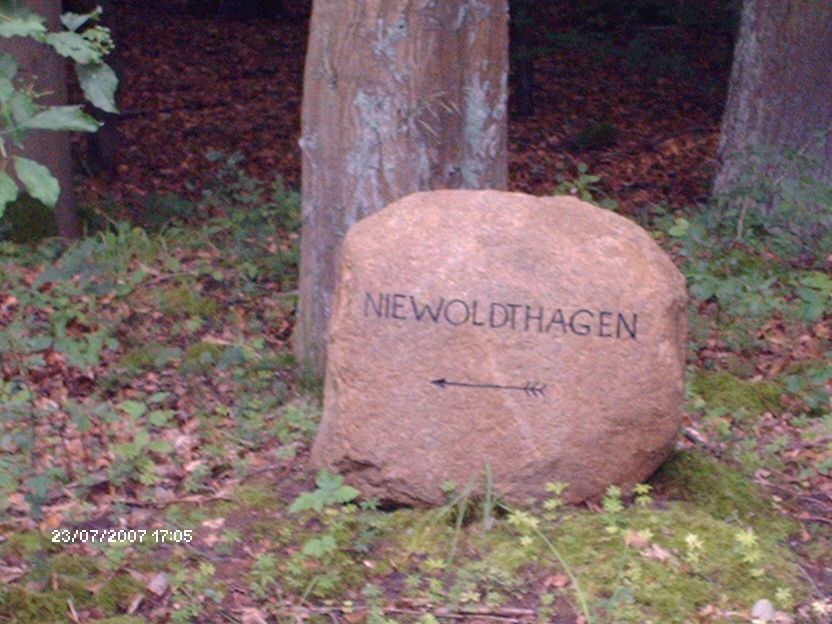
Waystone with alternate spelling of the name

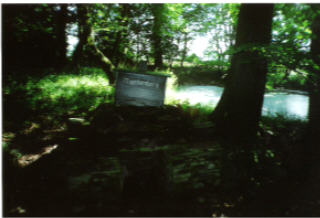
Angerbornspring
