= Dashwood (soil) =

Soil in British Columbia, Canada

Dashwood soil series is a coarse south-eastern Vancouver Island soil which has developed on permeable water-laid sand, gravel and stones which are underlain by less permeable glacial till or marine clay. These relatively impermeable layers usually allow Dashwood soils to retain moisture longer into the growing season than the similarly coarse, Qualicum series. Drainage classes in the Dashwood are moderately well drained, well drained (the usual) or excessive. Under the classification system of the 1950s, Dashwood was assigned to the brown podzolic great group; however, a continuous A_{2} (Ae or E) horizon was permitted at higher elevations and more northern parts of the survey area. Very few areas of Dashwood soil were developed for agriculture due to their high stone content, overwhelmingly sandy texture, infertile nature and poor moisture-holding capacity; instead, they remained as timber land for which they were well suited thanks to a perched water table provided by the less permeable subsoil.

In 1985, Dashwood soil was reclassified to the Dystric Brunisol great group with the Duric subgroup dominant.
