= Eickendorf =

Eickendorf may refer to the following places in Saxony-Anhalt, Germany:

- Eickendorf, Salzlandkreis
- Eickendorf, Börde
