= Elm-Lappwald Nature Park =

Nature park in Lower Saxony, Germany

Coordinates: 52.226°N 10.856°E

The Elm-Lappwald Nature Park (German: Naturpark Elm-Lappwald) is a nature park in southwest Lower Saxony, east of Brunswick in central Germany. It is dominated by the forested hill ranges of the Elm, Lappwald and Dorm as well as the region known as the Helmstedt Bowl (Helmstedter Mulde).

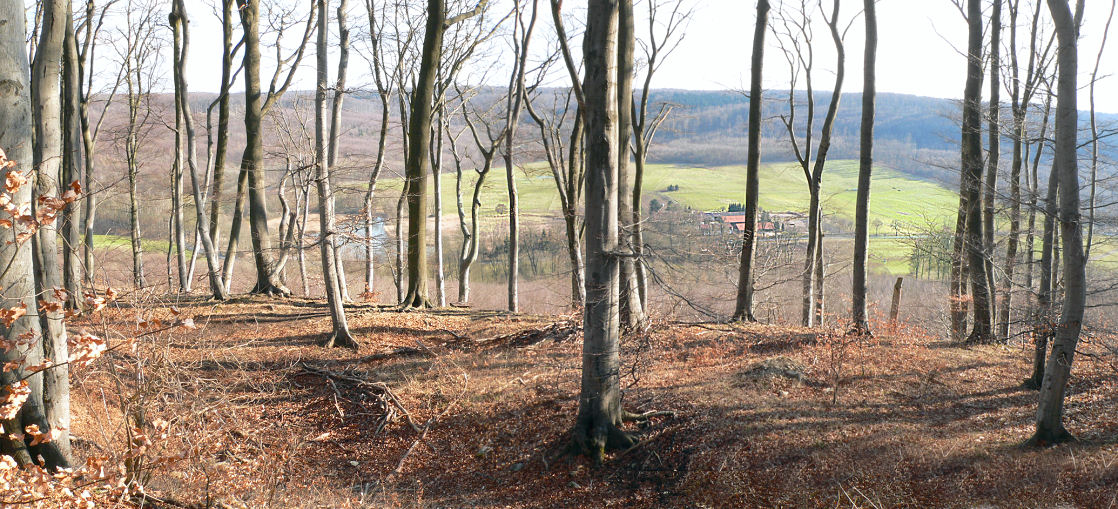
View through the beeches of the Hochwald forest in the Reitling valley in the Elm

== Geography ==
=== Location ===
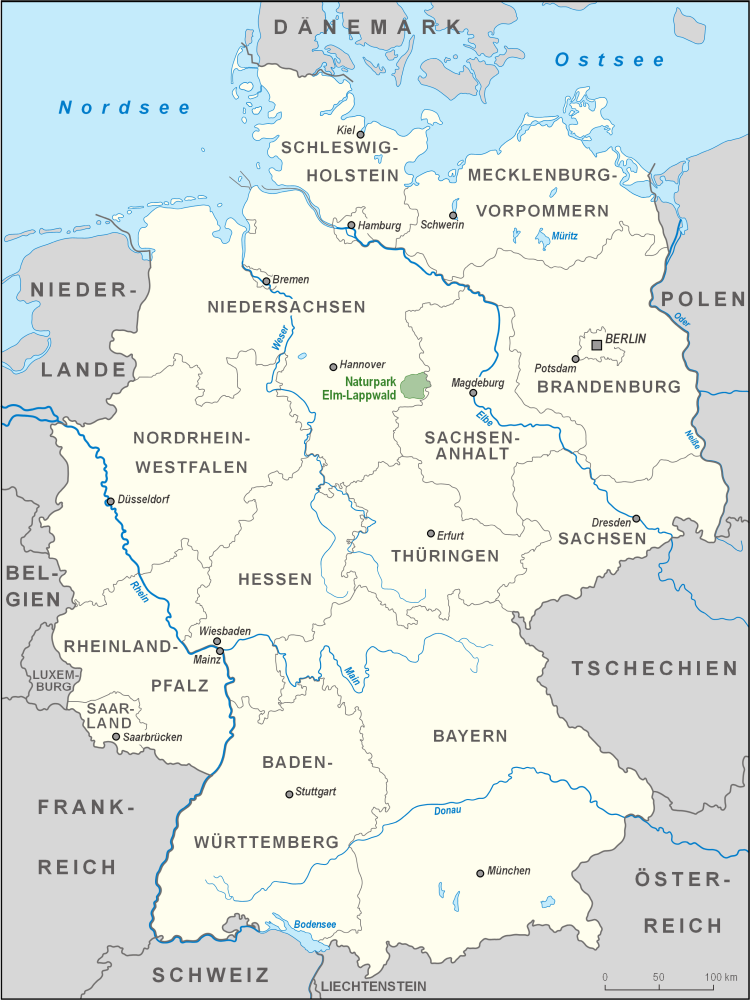
Location of the Elm-Lappwald Nature Park

The nature park has an area of about 470 square kilometres (180 sq mi) and lies within the districts of Helmstedt and Wolfenbüttel. It is bordered to the west by the city of Brunswick and to the north by Wolfsburg. The A 2 motorway from Hanover to Berlin cuts through the northern part of the park. Within the nature park are the following hill ranges, landscapes and forests:

- Elm
- Lappwald
- Dorm
- Elz
- Eiz
- Helmstedt Bowl
- Rieseberg and Rieseberg Moor
- Kampstüh Forest near Lehre

From a landscape point of view the nature park belongs to the Eastphalian Uplands. It is located between the highlands of the Harz to the south and the Lüneburg Heath on the North German Plain to the north. Climatically the park lies in the transition zone between the maritime and continental zones.

== History ==
=== Park history ===
The nature park was founded in 1977 thanks to cooperation between the districts of Helmstedt and Wolfenbüttel and the city of Brunswick. The Elm-Lappwald Nature Park has since become part of the UNESCO and European Geopark of Harz–Brunswick Land–Eastphalia.

=== Geological history ===
The last ice age ( the Weichselian glaciation) around 12,000 years ago deposited a layer of loess up to 3 metres thick in the southern part of the Helmstedt Bowl and in the entire Schöppenstedt Basin, on which fertile black and brown earths were formed. During periods of thaw, the ice sheets created the detailed shape of the land. A thick deciduous vegetation developed in the time after the ice age and covered the whole area of the present-day park. Their species matched the soil conditions. For example, in the northern part of the park oak and hornbeam woods alternated with beech and oak woods and with carrs on the wet, peaty areas (fens). In the southern part, beech forests predominated.

=== Settlement history ===
The area of the present-day nature park was already permanently settled in the 6th century BC, as evinced by the megalith graves. The settlement of this region by man changed the natural, vegetative cover, albeit the first settlers in the middle Stone Age, who were hunters, fishermen and gatherers, did not made any significant contribution to these changes. The hollows in the area with their deposits of loess soils encouraged early arable farming during the Stone Age. The dense woods were cleared very early on. The greatest loss of woodland occurred during the time of the great clearances (900 to 1200 AD), when the natural landscape was "brought under cultivation". Today place names ending in -rode, -hörst and -feld go back to this time of settlement. The Cistercian monks of Mariental in particular established numerous 'clearance villages'. Abbenrode, Hemkenrode and Erkerode on the northwest slope of the Elm and Rotenkamp on the Rieseberg date back to that time. In the Middle Ages there were clearly more settlements in the region. Almost half of them were given up again by their owners and fell into ruin, becoming abandoned villages. There is a particularly large number of these in the Lappwald, on the Dorm and on the southwest slope of the Elm. With its good soils, the area continues to be used for arable farming. Since the Middle Ages the towns of Königslutter, Schöningen, Schöppenstedt and Helmstedt, all within the nature park, have been steeped in history. A key factor in the early development of Helmstedt (already established by 952) was its location on the trade route from Brunswick to Magdeburg, the present B 1 federal highway.

== Flora and fauna ==
The Elm is the largest and most attractive beech forest in North Germany. Amongst the varied landscapes of the natur park are large areas of forest, moors, springs, lakes, heathland, salt meadows and chalk downs, rich in plant species. The park is home to over 800 species of plant, of which more than 10% are endangered. Birds, mammals and amphibians also occur in abundance in the nature parks habitats. The Reitling valley in the Elm and the Brunnen valley in the Lappwald have been described as "idyllic".

== See also ==
- List of nature parks in Germany

== Sources ==
- Naturpark Elm-Lappwald, fotografiert von Peter Hamel, Text von Hermann Gutmann u. Friedrich Schröder, Hamburg 1989, Hrsg.: Hans Christians, Hamburg
