= Döhren =

- Stadtteil of Oebisfelde-Weferlingen
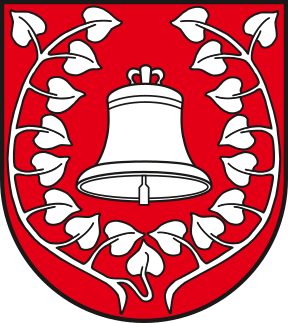
- Coat of arms
- Interactive map of Döhren
- Location within Germany Location within Saxony-Anhalt
- Coordinates: 52°20′N 11°1′E
- Country: Germany
- State: Saxony-Anhalt
- District: Börde
- Town: Oebisfelde-Weferlingen

Area
  - Total: 6.01 km^{2} (2.32 sq mi)
- Elevation: 105 m (344 ft)

Population (2006-12-31)
  - Total: 220
  - Density: 37/km^{2} (95/sq mi)
- Time zone: UTC+01:00 (CET)
  - Summer (DST): UTC+02:00 (CEST)
- Postal codes: 39356
- Dialling codes: 039061
- Vehicle registration: BK

Döhren (German pronunciation: [ˈdøːʁən]) is a village and a former municipality in the Börde district in Saxony-Anhalt, Germany. Since 1 January 2010, it is part of the town Oebisfelde-Weferlingen.

== Geography ==
Döhren is located about two km north of Helmstedt, on the border of the Lappwald mountain range.

== History ==
In 1910 there were 434 residents in Döhren. From 1994 until 1 January 2005 Dören was a part of the administration partnership Weferlingen. From 2005 until 31 December 2009, a member of the administration collectivity Flechtingen.

As a result of a Gebietsänderungsvereinbarung (an agreement to change territories) the municipal councils of Oebisfelde (on 27 May 2009), Bösdorf (26 May 2009), Eickendorf (28 May 2009), Etingen (26 May 2009), Kathendorf (19 May 2009), Rätzlingen (27 May 2009), Eschenrode (28 May 2009), Döhren (28 May 2009), Hödingen (20 May 2009), Hörsingen (27 May 2009), Schwanefeld (25 May 2009), Seggerde (26 June 2009), Siestedt (28 May 2009), Walbeck (28 May 2009) and Flecken Werflingen (19 May 2009) agreed to dissolve their municipalities and become entwined with the town of Oebisfelde-Weferlingen. The application was accepted by the commune oversight committee and came into force on 1 January 2010.

Following the application becoming law, the independent community of Döhren along with its constituent communities became a part of the new town of Kalbe. In the new municipality and current locality of Döhren, a council was formed with seven members including the local mayor.

== Politics ==
The previous voluntary mayor Frank-Hildemar Rosburg was elected to serve from 6 May 2001 to 31 December 2009, and has since then become the local mayor.

=== Local Council ===
According to the last local elections on 7 June 2009, the municipal council had eight members. Due to the founding of Oebisfelde-Weferlingen, the municipal council automatically became the local council. The voter turnout was 44.6%. The election brought the following result:

- Wählergruppen 6 seats (76.9%)
- SPD 2 seats (23.1%)

A local council with five members was elected in 2014. In addition, the local mayor is the chairman of the local council.

=== Crest and Flag ===
The coat of arms was approved on 2 March 2004 by the Magdeburg Regional Council.

Blazoning: "In red a ringing silver bell, surrounded by two leafy silver lime branches, the right one with 10, the left one with 9 leaves, all leaves except one in the upper corners of the shield facing the bell."

The colours of the municipality are silver (white) and red, derived from the coat of arms motifs and shield colour.

The silver bell symbolizes the 17th century hall church in the center of the rundling village of Döhren and the bell inside it, cast in 1508 by the famous Brunswick bell founder Henrik Mente - according to the inscription. Since the bell tower had to be demolished in 1987 due to its dilapidation, the bell remained silent for 10 years. In 1997 it was re-hung in the newly erected tower; therefore it is shown ringing. Thirdly, the bell represents the connection of the community with the Mariental Monastery. Like the courtyards of the roundabout around the church, the two lime branches nestle in a circle around the bell. The 19 leaves symbolise the farmsteads that became the property of Döhren residents in 1809 after the former Mahrenholz manor was bought and divided. The linden branches also make reference to a linden tree from an old municipal seal.

The coat of arms was designed by the Magdeburg heraldist Ernst Albrecht Fiedler.

The flag of Döhren is white-red (1:1) striped (transverse form: stripes running horizontally, longitudinal form: stripes running vertically) and is centrally covered with the municipal coat of arms.

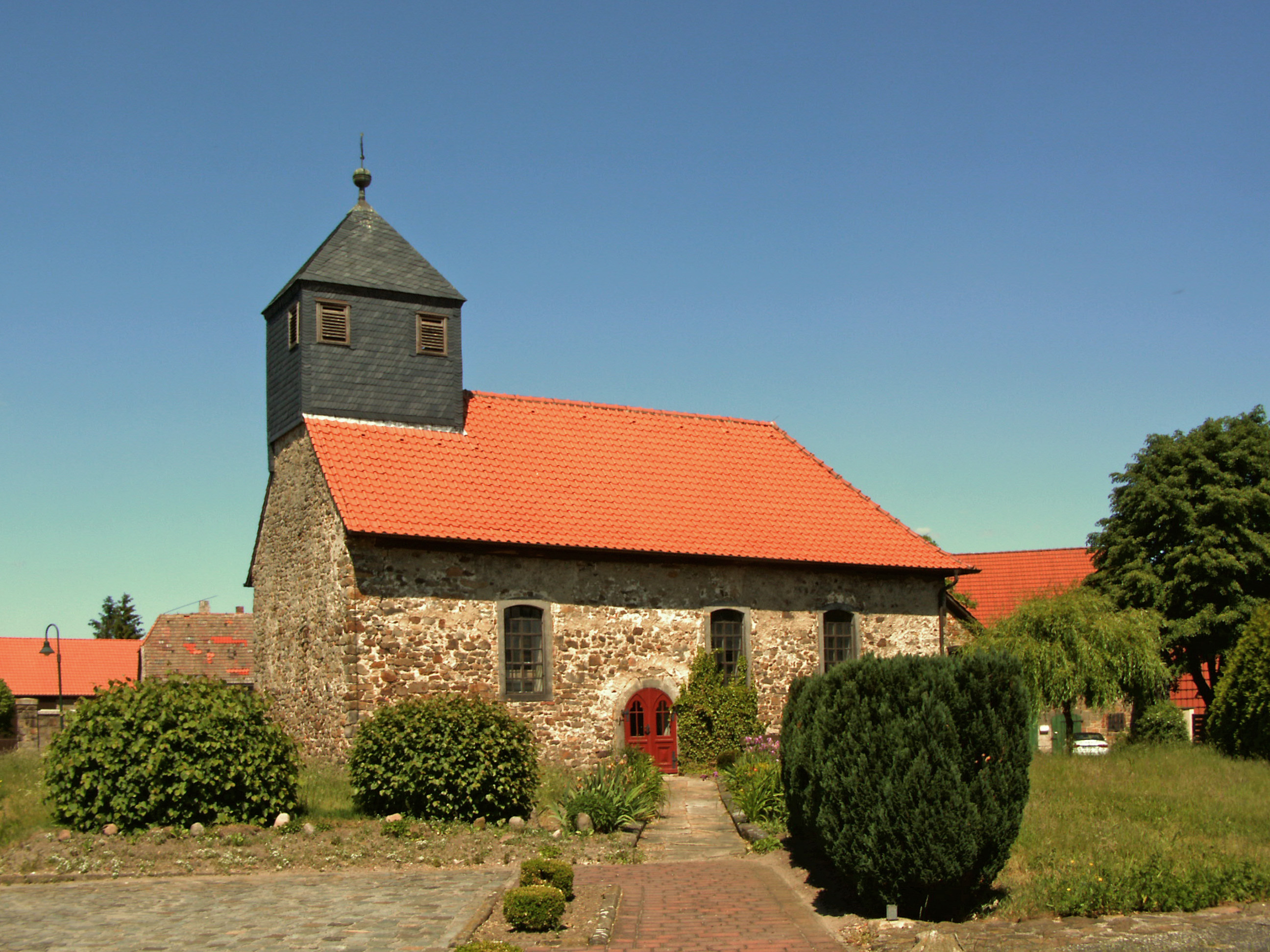
The Lutheran Church

== Culture and Sights ==
=== Buildings ===
Around the village church in the old village centre there are many half-timbered houses from the 17th to 19th century.

== Economy and Infrastructure ==
There used to be a linen factory in Döhren, whose chimney still stands.

=== Transportation Connections ===
To the Bundesstraße 1, which connects Braunschweig with Berlin, it is about 16 kilometers in southern direction. The Bundesautobahn 2 (junction Helmstedt-West) is reached after 14 kilometers. Döhren had a station on the Helmstedt-Oebisfelde railway line, which was last served from Weferlingen.
