= Katzendorf =

Katzendorf may refer to:

- German name for Câțcău, commune in Cluj County, Romania
- German name for Cața, commune in Brașov County, Romania
- Katzendorf, Gnas, village in Gnas, Styria, Austria
- German name for Starojická Lhota, village, part of Starý Jičín municipality, Czechia

== See also ==
- Kattendorf
- Kathendorf
- Kittendorf
