= Bösdorf =

Bösdorf may refer to places in Germany:

- Bösdorf, Schleswig-Holstein, in the Plön district of Schleswig-Holstein
- Bösdorf, Saxony-Anhalt, in the Börde district of Saxony-Anhalt
