= Qualicum (soil) =

Type of soil series

Qualicum soil series is a coarse, well to rapidly drained soil which has developed on gravelly glaciofluvial, fluvial and marine deposits. Gravel content is always significant. The usual classification is Orthic Dystric Brunisol.

This series was first named in 1959, put in the brown podzolic great group and assigned to sandy or gravelly interglacial materials, glacio-fluvial deposits, aeolian deposits and marine deposits. Qualicum series was mapped throughout the surveyed area except in the San Juan, Alberni and Sayward valleys. Non-gravelly Qualicum soils were mapped as Qls for Qualicum loamy sand while others were plotted as Qgls for Qualicum gravelly loamy sand. The series was considered to be infertile and submarginal for agriculture except for specialty crops to be treated heavily with stable manure, green manure and commercial fertilizers, and marketed early.

Reclassification in 1985 led to the Qualicum series being subdivided to include Quennell and Kaptara series. Qualicum remains on active status as a brunisol while Quennell is a podzol and Kaptara is a gleysol.
