= Everingen =

- Stadtteil of Oebisfelde-Weferlingen
- Interactive map of Everingen
- Location within Germany Location within Saxony-Anhalt
- Coordinates: 52°22′N 11°6′E
- Country: Germany
- State: Saxony-Anhalt
- District: Börde
- Town: Oebisfelde-Weferlingen

Area
  - Total: 6.26 km^{2} (2.42 sq mi)
- Elevation: 84 m (276 ft)

Population (2009-12-31)
  - Total: 183
  - Density: 29.2/km^{2} (75.7/sq mi)
- Time zone: UTC+01:00 (CET)
  - Summer (DST): UTC+02:00 (CEST)
- Postal codes: 39359
- Dialling codes: 039057

Everingen is a village and a former municipality in the Börde district in Saxony-Anhalt, Germany.

Since 1 September 2010, it is part of the town Oebisfelde-Weferlingen.
