= Etingen =

- Stadtteil of Oebisfelde-Weferlingen
- Coat of arms
- Interactive map of Etingen
- Location within Germany Location within Saxony-Anhalt
- Coordinates: 52°23′36″N 11°10′11″E
- Country: Germany
- State: Saxony-Anhalt
- District: Börde
- Town: Oebisfelde-Weferlingen

Area
  - Total: 16.93 km^{2} (6.54 sq mi)
- Elevation: 77 m (253 ft)

Population (2006-12-31)
  - Total: 512
  - Density: 30.2/km^{2} (78.3/sq mi)
- Time zone: UTC+01:00 (CET)
  - Summer (DST): UTC+02:00 (CEST)
- Postal codes: 39359
- Dialling codes: 039059
- Vehicle registration: BK

Etingen (German pronunciation: [ˈeːtɪŋən]) is a village and former municipality in the Börde district in Saxony-Anhalt, Germany. Since 1 January 2010, it has been part of the town of Oebisfelde-Weferlingen.
