= Rätzlingen, Saxony-Anhalt =

Rätzlingen
- Stadtteil of Oebisfelde-Weferlingen
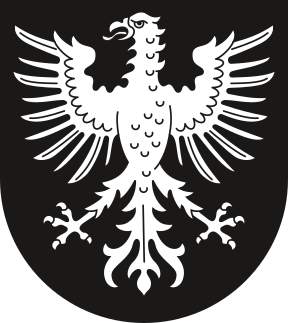
- Coat of arms
- Interactive map of Rätzlingen
- Location within Germany Location within Saxony-Anhalt
- Coordinates: 52°24′N 11°7′E
- Country: Germany
- State: Saxony-Anhalt
- District: Börde
- Town: Oebisfelde-Weferlingen

Area
  - Total: 14.74 km^{2} (5.69 sq mi)
- Elevation: 74 m (243 ft)

Population (2006-12-31)
  - Total: 790
  - Density: 54/km^{2} (140/sq mi)
- Time zone: UTC+01:00 (CET)
  - Summer (DST): UTC+02:00 (CEST)
- Postal codes: 39359
- Dialling codes: 039057
- Vehicle registration: BK

Rätzlingen (German pronunciation: [ˈʁɛtslɪŋən]) is a village and a former municipality in the Börde district in Saxony-Anhalt, Germany. Since 1 January 2010, it is part of the town Oebisfelde-Weferlingen.
