= Brown earth =

Soil type

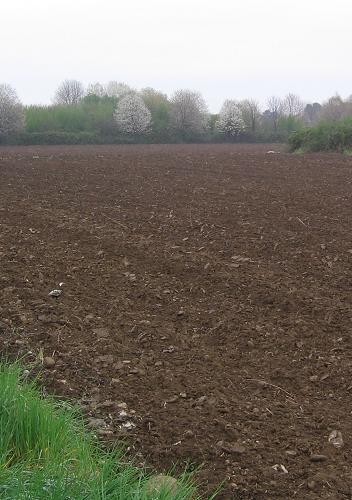
Brown soil

Brown earth or brown soil is a type of soil. Brown earths are mostly located between 35° and 55° north of the Equator. The largest expanses cover western and central Europe, large areas of western and trans-Uralian Russia, the east coast of America and eastern Asia. Here, areas of brown earth soil types are found particularly in Japan, Korea, China, eastern Australia and New Zealand. Brown earths cover 45% of the land in England and Wales. They are common in lowland areas (below 1,000 feet) on permeable parent material. The most common vegetation types are deciduous woodland and grassland. Due to the reasonable natural fertility of brown earths, large tracts of deciduous woodland have been cut down and the land is now used for farming. They are normally located in regions with a humid temperate climate. Rainfall totals are moderate, usually below 76 cm per year, and temperatures range from 4 °C in the winter to 18 °C in the summer. They are well-drained fertile soils with a pH of between 5.0 and 6.5.

== Horizontal structure ==
Soils generally have three horizons: the A, B and C horizon. Horizon A is usually a brownish colour, and over 20 cm in depth. It is composed of mull humus (well decomposed alkaline organic matter) and mineral matter. It is biologically active with many soil organisms and plant roots mixing the mull humus with mineral particles. As a result, the boundary between the A and B horizons can be ill-defined in unploughed examples. Horizon B is mostly composed of mineral matter which has been weathered from the parent material, but it often contains inclusions of more organic material carried in by organisms, especially earthworms. It is lighter in colour than the A horizon, and is often weakly illuviated (enriched with material from overlying horizons). Due to limited leaching only the more soluble bases are moved down through the profile. Horizon C is made up of the parent material, which is generally permeable and non- or slightly acidic, for example clay loam.

== General relations in western Europe ==
Brown earths are important, because they are permeable and usually easy to work throughout the year, so they are valued for agriculture. They also support a much wider range of forest trees than can be found on wetter land. They are freely drained soils with well-developed A and B horizons. They often develop over relatively permeable bedrock of some kind, but are also found over unconsolidated parent materials like river gravels. Some soil classifications include well-drained alluvial soils in the brown earths too.

Typically the brown earths have dark brown topsoils with loamy particle size-classes and good structure – especially under grassland. The B horizon lacks the grey colours and mottles characteristic of gley soils. The rich colour is the result of iron compounds, mainly complex oxides which, like rust, have a reddish-brown colour. Some of these soils are, in fact, red. For example, in Great Britain reddish brown earths occur on the Old Red Sandstone (Devonian) and the New Red Sandstone (Permian), and are red because the rocks from which they formed are derived from strongly oxidised deposits that were laid down under desert conditions millions of years ago.

In long-cultivated soils the pH in the topsoil tends to be higher (more alkaline) than in the subsoil as a result of the addition of lime over the years. In general, the wetter the climate, the more acidic the soils. This is because rain tends to wash the "alkaline" bases out of the soil. Of course, the parent material also has an effect, and hard acidic rocks give rise to more acidic soils than do the softer sandstones. The landscapes where these lowland soils occur are typically undulating, and interesting variations in the profiles relate to the slopes where they are found. We think, perhaps of soils as static and unchanging, but in fact they are never stationary. The processes of weathering and plant growth that were responsible for the formation of soils from bare parent materials in the first place are still going on. This is most easily seen on a hill slope. The top of the hill is usually convex, and it is here that most erosion is taking place – upper slopes and summits are more exposed to wind, and rain, and gravity is slowly but surely moving the topsoil down the hill. Thus soils on the brow of the hill tend to be shallower than those in mid-slope positions, where soil is moving down, but being replaced by material from above. At the base of the slope we usually find a concave area where the eroded soil has accumulated. Here the topsoils will be significantly thicker than elsewhere.

== Soil formation factors ==
A brown earth soil is affected by several different factors. These include: climate, relief, soil drainage, parent material and the soil biota that live in the soil itself.

== Classification ==
Brown earths have a long history of being a major grouping in most soil classifications. In France they have been included with "sol brun acide", although these soils may tend to have more iron and aluminium in the B horizon, and tend to what, in the British classification, is called a brown podzolic soil. Brown earths are also classified in the German and Austrian soil taxonomy as "Braunerde." Braunerden are widespread and frequently occur on unconsolidated parent sand or loess parent materials. "Parabraunerde" is the classification for a brown earth with an eluvial horizon above a slightly argillic, clayey illuvial horizon. This gives rise to a universal division of these, generally brown and well drained soils into the weakly leached brown earths - called cambisols in the international World Reference Base for Soil Resources (WRB); and more leached brown podzolic soils in which there is an orange-brown B horizon, but no pale leached horizon between the A and the B horizons. These are called Umbrisols in the WRB, and are particularly common in western Europe, covering large areas in NW Spain.

Further east in Europe, in more continental climates, the soils show greater leaching of clay and other minerals, and are mapped as luvisols in the WRB. These are rather similar to brown earths, and some other classifications, including the British and French, call these soils argillic brown earths (sol brun lessive), because they have an argillic, i.e. clay-enriched horizon at some depth well below the A horizon. The argillic character is rather weakly expressed in the oceanic climate of the UK, and the differences between brown earths proper (cambic brown earths) and argillic yellow earths are not apparent to the general observer.
