= Oebisfelde =

Town in Saxony-Anhalt, Germany

- Stadtteil of Oebisfelde-Weferlingen
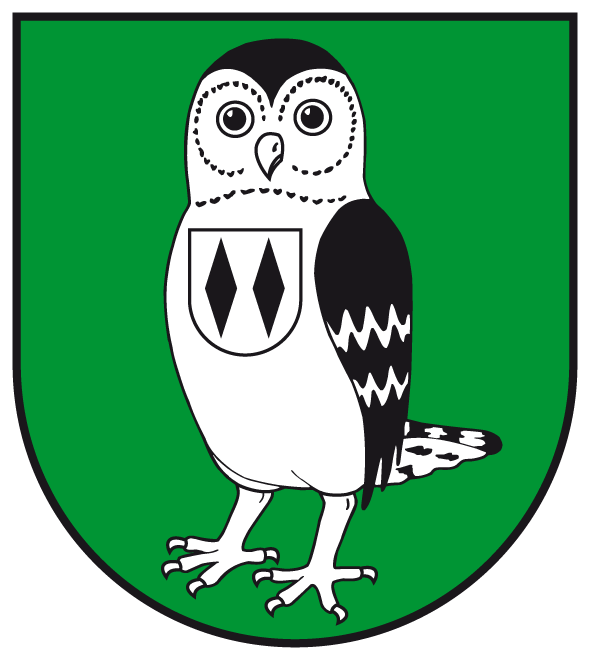
- Coat of arms
- Interactive map of Oebisfelde
- Location within Germany Location within Saxony-Anhalt
- Coordinates: 52°26′N 10°59′E
- Country: Germany
- State: Saxony-Anhalt
- District: Börde
- Town: Oebisfelde-Weferlingen

Area
  - Total: 95.6 km^{2} (36.9 sq mi)
- Elevation: 62 m (203 ft)

Population (2011)
  - Total: 4,661
  - Density: 48.8/km^{2} (126/sq mi)
- Time zone: UTC+01:00 (CET)
  - Summer (DST): UTC+02:00 (CEST)
- Postal codes: 39646
- Dialling codes: 039002, 039057
- Vehicle registration: BK
- Website: www.oebisfelde.info

Oebisfelde (German pronunciation: [øːbɪsˈfɛldə]) is a town and a former municipality in the Börde district in Saxony-Anhalt, Germany. Since 1 January 2010, it is part of the town Oebisfelde-Weferlingen.

It is accessed by Bundesstraße (German federal highway) 188.

== Geography ==
Oebisfelde is in the Altmark/Magdeburg Börde area. It borders on Lower Saxony, across the Aller river. East of Oebisfelde is the Drömling Nature Park.

=== Subdivisions ===
- Bergfriede
- Breitenrode
- Buchhorst
- Gehrendorf
- Lockstedt
- Niendorf
- Wassensdorf
- Weddendorf

== History ==
Between 1945 and 1990 the Oebisfelde railway station served as an East German inner German border crossing for rail transport. In Oebisfelde's component village of Buchhorst there was an East German border crossing for inland navigation on the Mittellandkanal, only open for freight vessels. The traffic between the Soviet Zone of occupation in Germany (until 1949, thereafter the East German Democratic Republic, or West Berlin and the British zone of occupation) and Federal Republic of Germany was subject to the Interzonal traffic regulations, which, between West Germany and West Berlin, followed the special regulations of the Transit Agreement (1972).

== Twinnings ==
- Lidzbark Welski, Poland

== Sites of interest ==
- The 10th century Oebisfelde water castle
- Naturpark Drömling
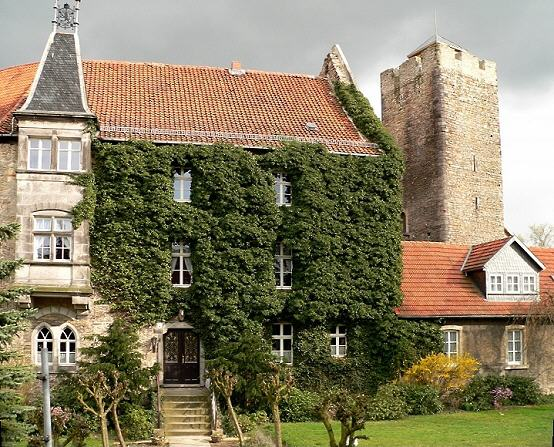
The water castle

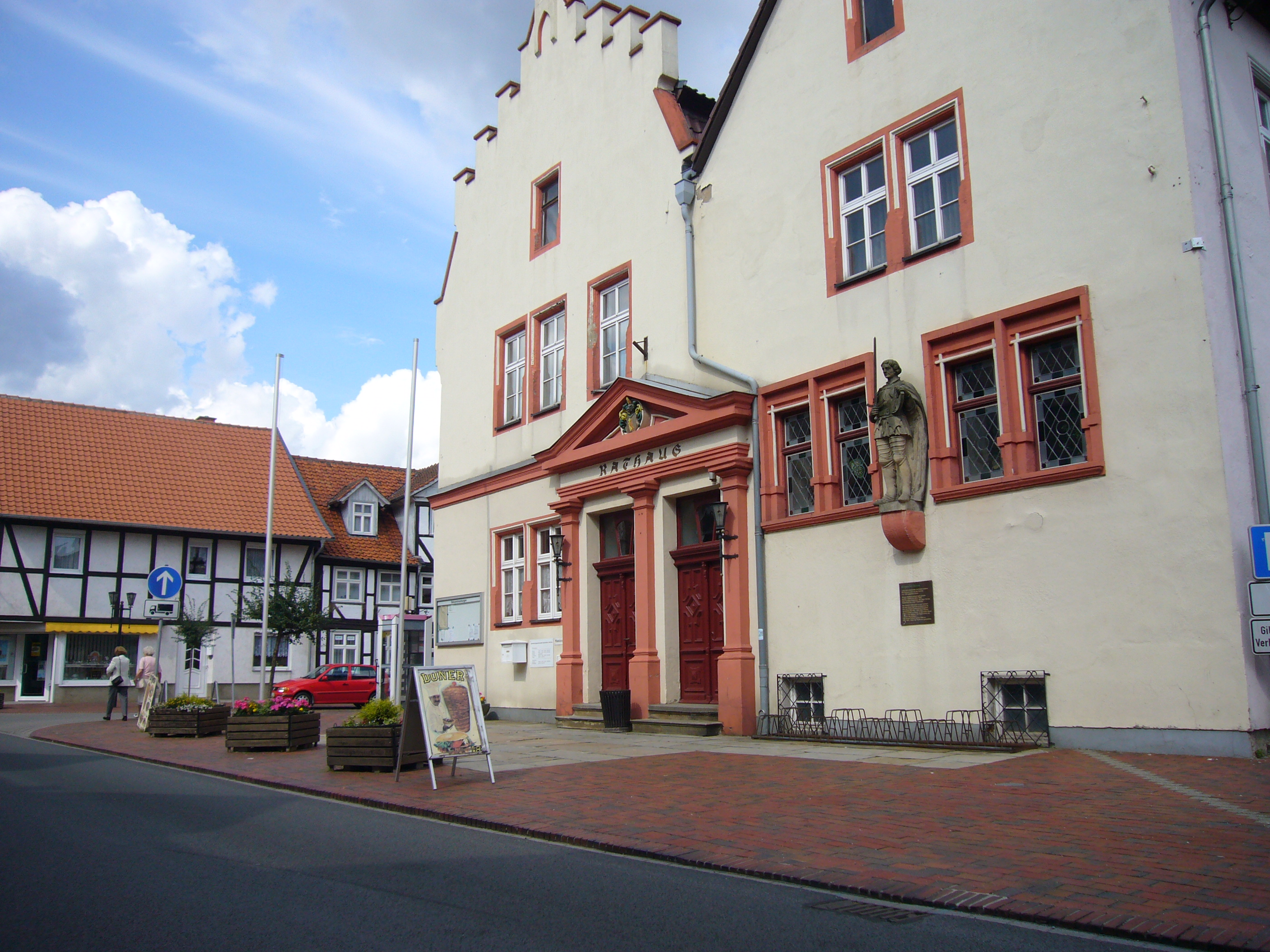
The townhall

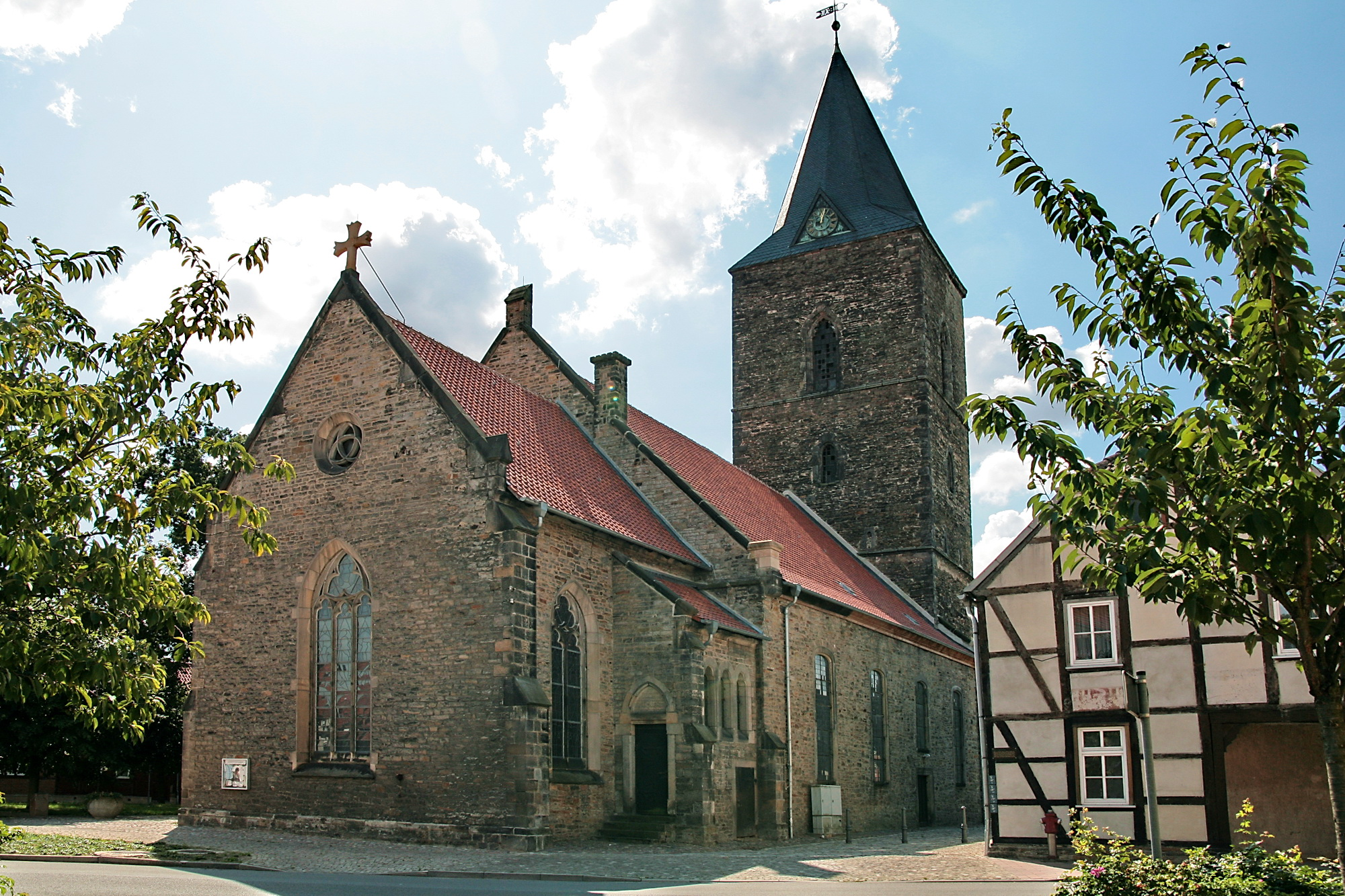
The Lutheran Church

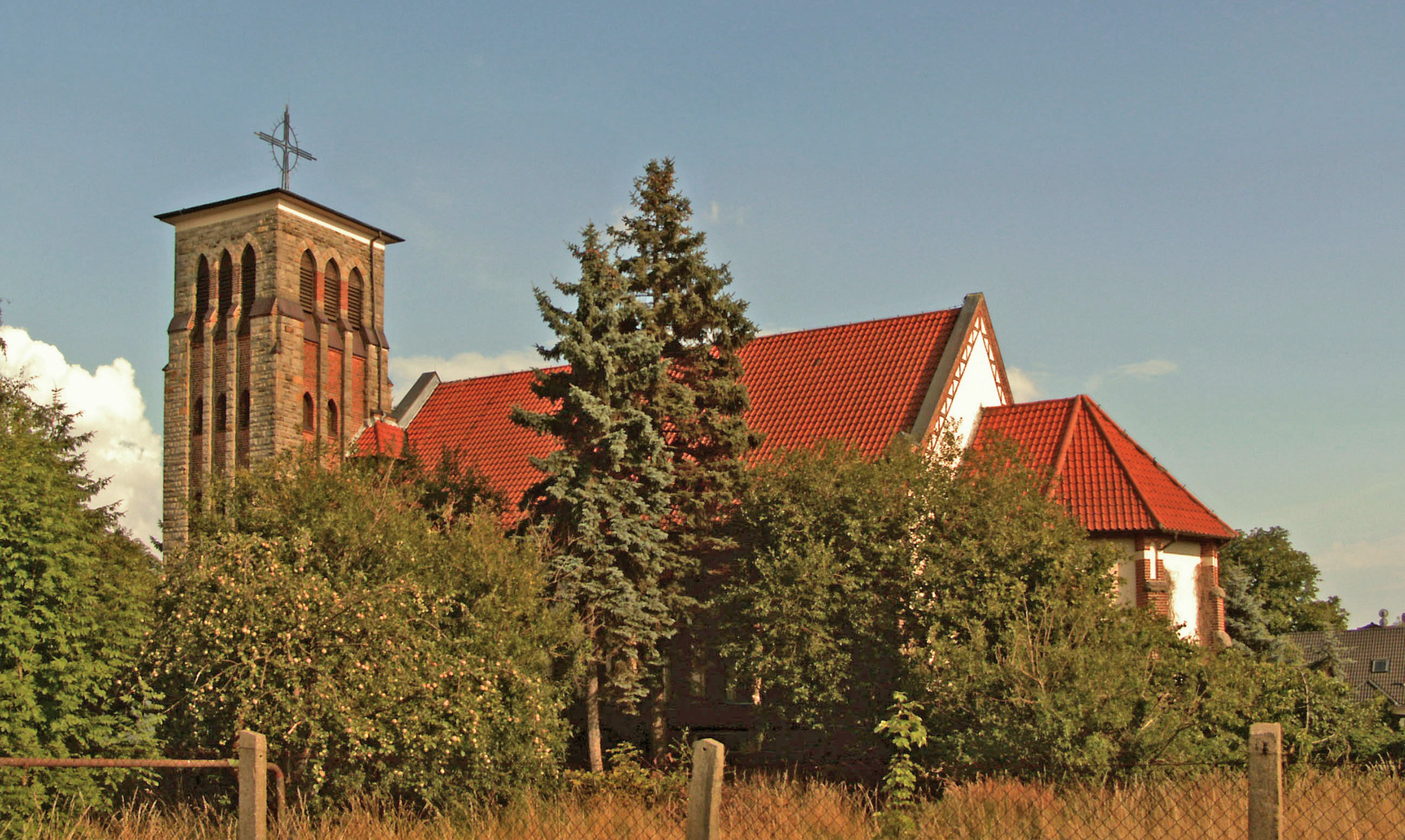
The Catholic Church

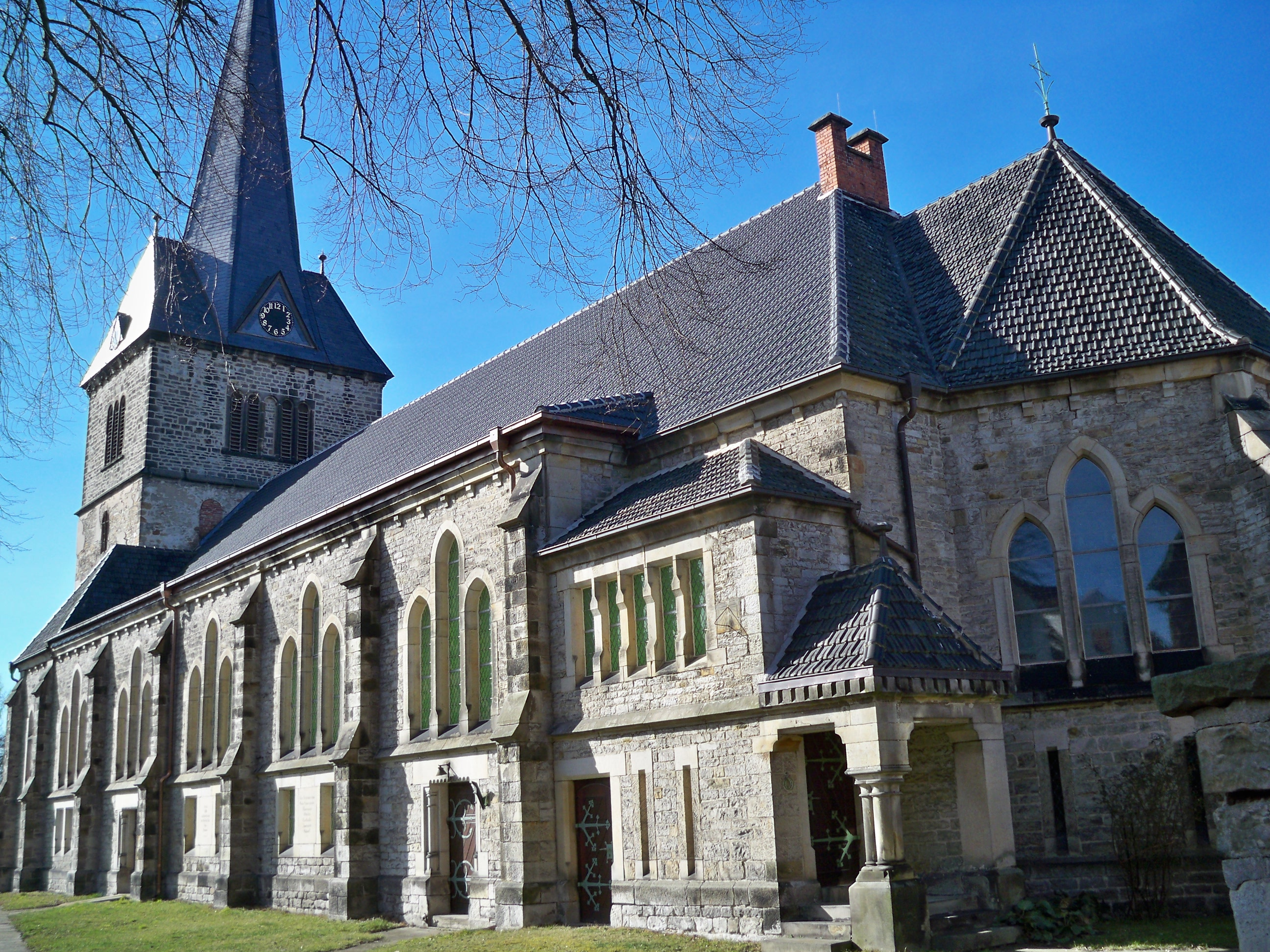
The former Lutheran Church
