= Oebisfelde-Weferlingen =

- Town
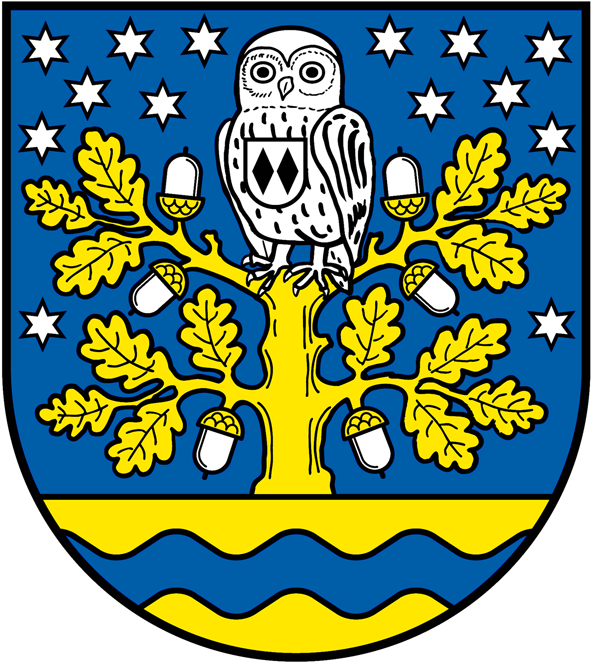
- Coat of arms

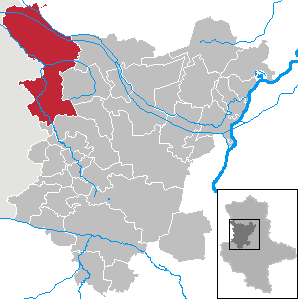
- Location of Oebisfelde-Weferlingen within Börde district
- Interactive map of Oebisfelde-Weferlingen
- Location within Germany Location within Saxony-Anhalt
- Coordinates: 52°26′N 10°59′E
- Country: Germany
- State: Saxony-Anhalt
- District: Börde

Government
  - Mayor (2023–30): Marc Blanck (CDU)

Area
  - Total: 249.3 km^{2} (96.3 sq mi)

Population (2025-12-31)
  - Total: 12,883
  - Density: 51.68/km^{2} (133.8/sq mi)
- Time zone: UTC+01:00 (CET)
  - Summer (DST): UTC+02:00 (CEST)
- Postal codes: 39343 (Schwanefeld), 39356 (Döhren, Eschenrode, Hödingen, Hörsingen, Seggerde, Siestedt, Walbeck, Weferlingen), 39359 (Bösdorf, Eickendorf, Etingen, Everingen, Kathendorf, Rätzlingen), 39646 (Oebisfelde)
- Dialling codes: 039002, 039050, 039055, 039057, 039059, 039061
- Vehicle registration: BK, OK
- Website: www.stadt-oebisfelde-weferlingen.de

Oebisfelde-Weferlingen (German pronunciation: [øːbɪsˈfɛldə ˈveːfɐlɪŋən]) is a town in the Börde district in Saxony-Anhalt, Germany. It was formed on 1 January 2010 by the merger of the former municipalities Bösdorf, Döhren, Eickendorf, Eschenrode, Etingen, Hödingen, Hörsingen, Kathendorf, Oebisfelde, Rätzlingen, Schwanefeld, Seggerde, Siestedt, Walbeck and Weferlingen. On 1 September 2010 Everingen was also incorporated. These 16 former municipalities are now Ortschaften or municipal divisions of the town Oebisfelde-Weferlingen.
