= Siestedt =

- Stadtteil of Oebisfelde-Weferlingen
- Interactive map of Siestedt
- Location within Germany Location within Saxony-Anhalt
- Coordinates: 52°19′N 11°5′E
- Country: Germany
- State: Saxony-Anhalt
- District: Börde
- Town: Oebisfelde-Weferlingen

Area
  - Total: 14.91 km^{2} (5.76 sq mi)
- Elevation: 88 m (289 ft)

Population (2006-12-31)
  - Total: 588
  - Density: 39.4/km^{2} (102/sq mi)
- Time zone: UTC+01:00 (CET)
  - Summer (DST): UTC+02:00 (CEST)
- Postal codes: 39356
- Dialling codes: 039061

Siestedt (German pronunciation: [ˈziːʃtɛt]) is a village and a former municipality in the Börde district in Saxony-Anhalt, Germany. Since 1 January 2010, it is part of the town Oebisfelde-Weferlingen.
