= Bösdorf, Saxony-Anhalt =

Bösdorf
- Stadtteil of Oebisfelde-Weferlingen
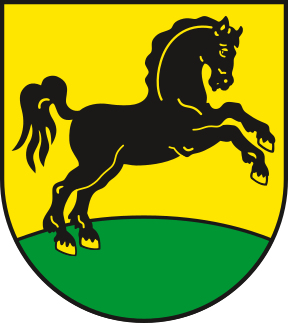
- Coat of arms
- Interactive map of Bösdorf
- Location within Germany Location within Saxony-Anhalt
- Coordinates: 52°24′52″N 11°4′17″E
- Country: Germany
- State: Saxony-Anhalt
- District: Börde
- Town: Oebisfelde-Weferlingen

Area
  - Total: 11.98 km^{2} (4.63 sq mi)
- Elevation: 62 m (203 ft)

Population (2011)
  - Total: 423
  - Density: 35.3/km^{2} (91.4/sq mi)
- Time zone: UTC+01:00 (CET)
  - Summer (DST): UTC+02:00 (CEST)
- Postal codes: 39359
- Dialling codes: 039057
- Vehicle registration: BK

Bösdorf is a village and a former municipality in the Börde district in Saxony-Anhalt, Germany. Since 1 January 2010, it is part of the town Oebisfelde-Weferlingen.
