= Lappwald =

Wooded hills in central Germany

Coordinates: 52°15′21.52″N 11°02′23.30″E

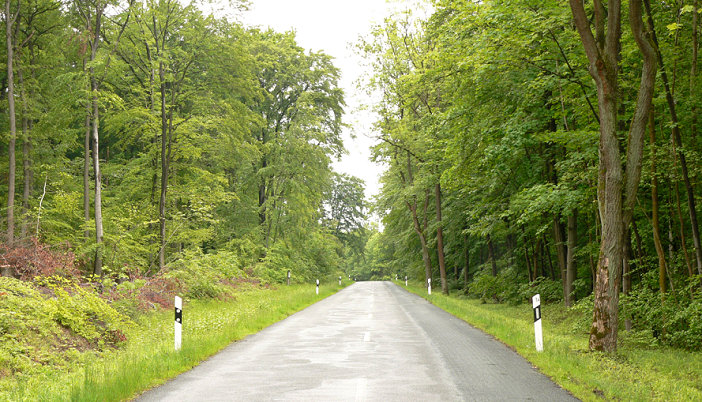
Road in the Lappwald near Bad Helmstedt

The Lappwald is a heavily wooded range of hills, 20 km long and up to 5 km wide, in central Germany. It stretches northwards from the town of Helmstedt. The border between Lower Saxony and Saxony-Anhalt runs through the woods, of which about three quarters is on Lower Saxon terrain. The Lappwald is part of the Elm-Lappwald Nature Park.

== Location ==
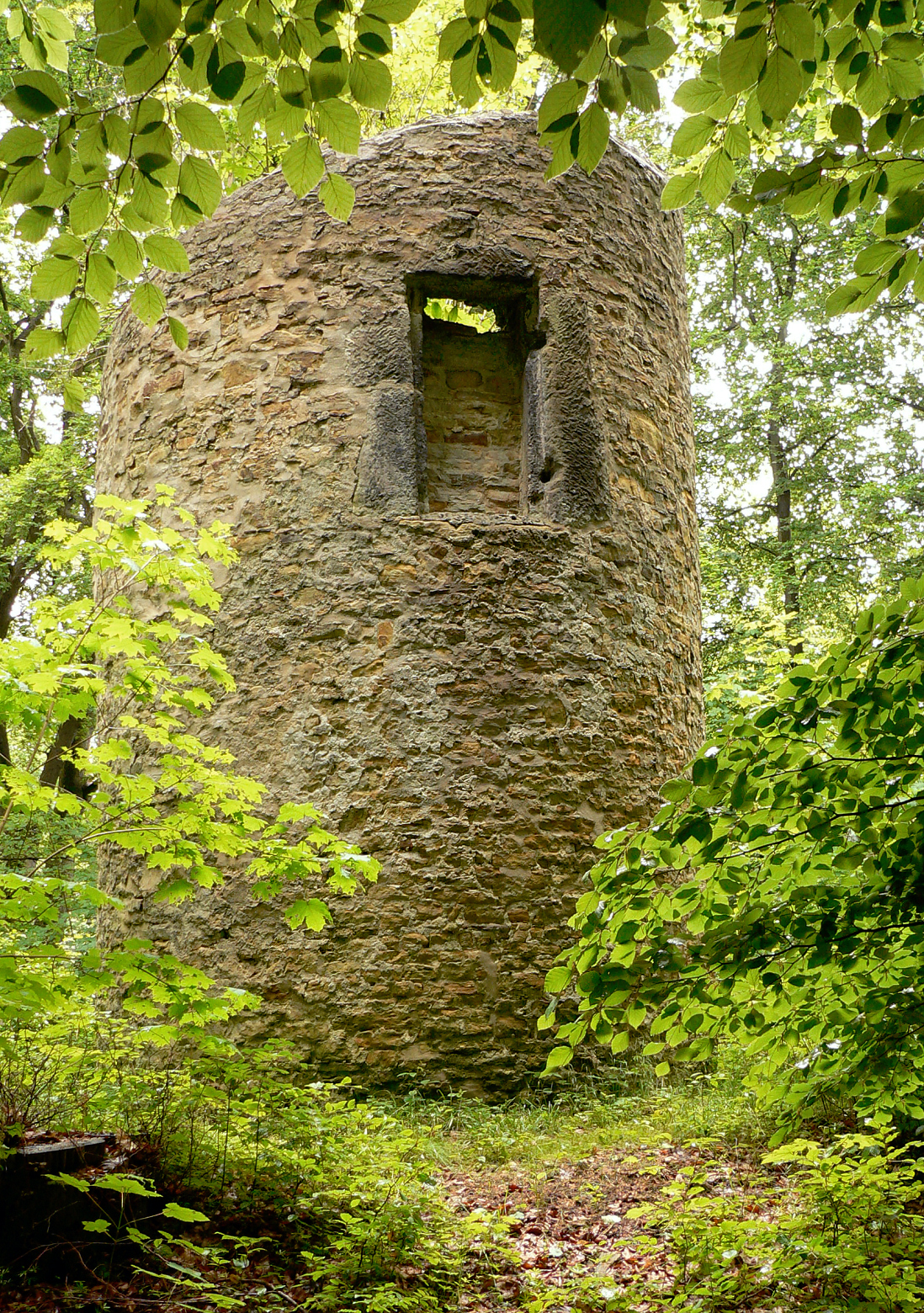
The 1st Walbecker Warte, a watchtower on the Helmstedt dyke (Landwehr)

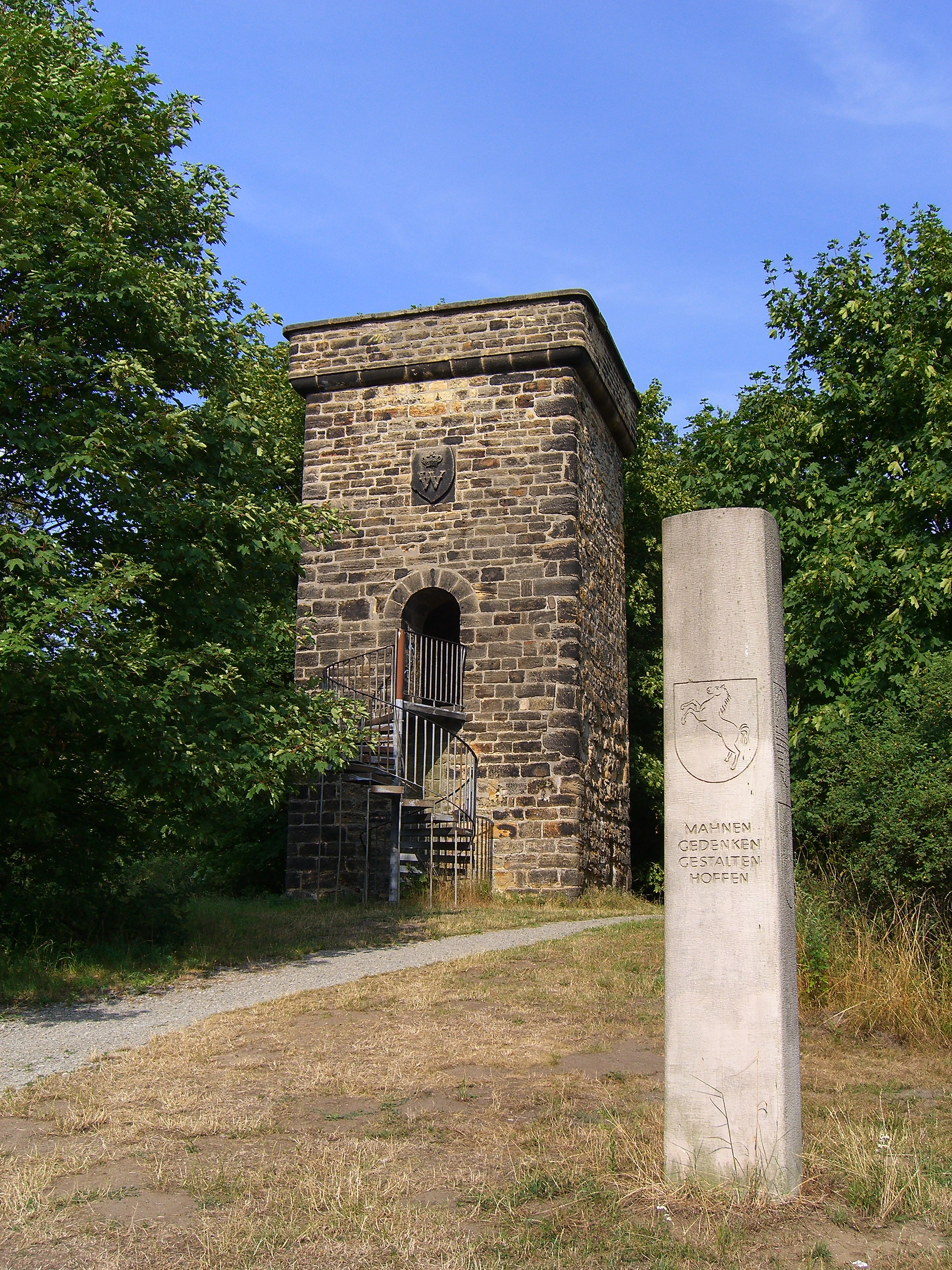
Magdeburg watchtower near Helmstedt

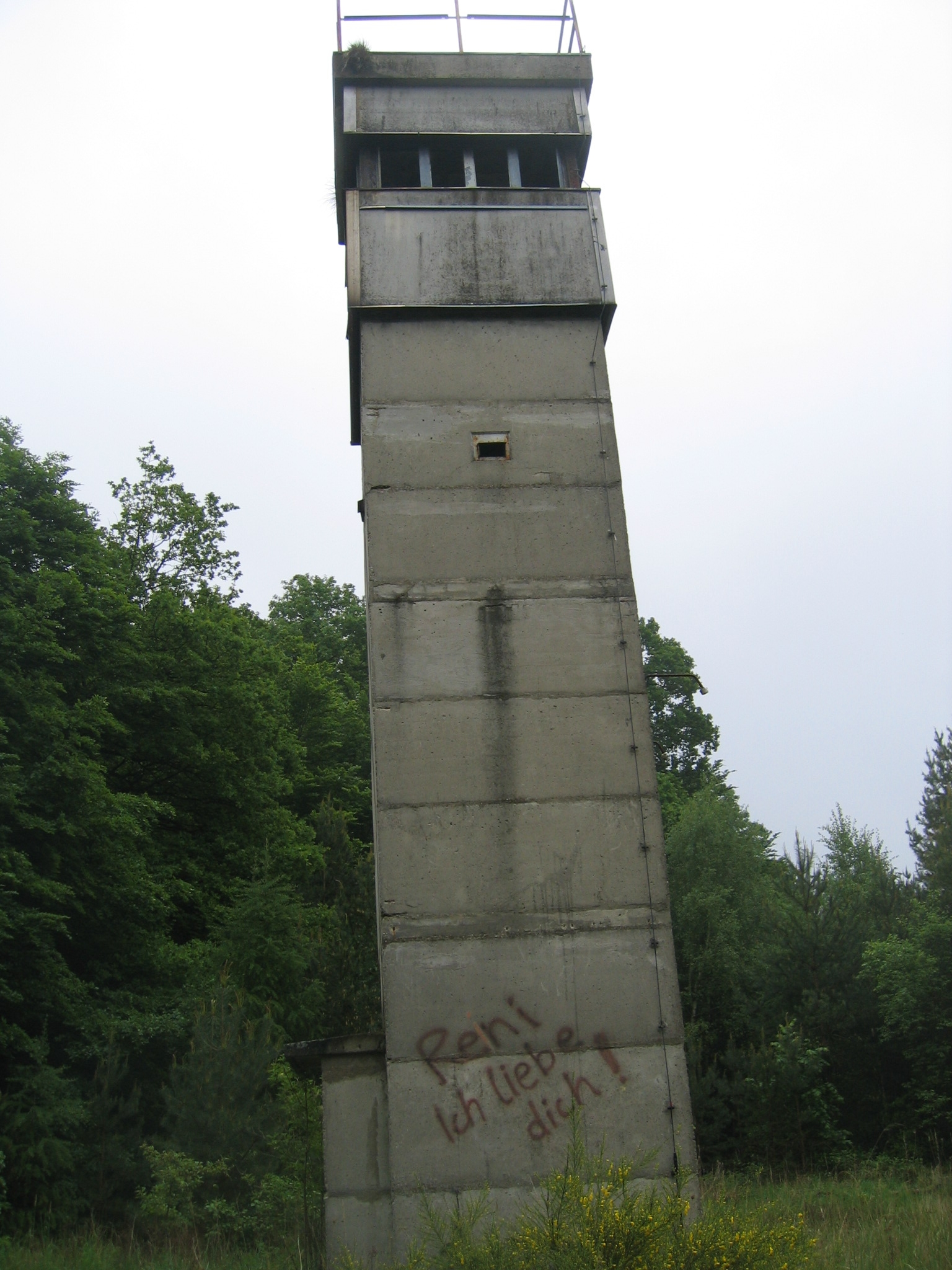
Watchtower on the former Inner German Border in the Lappwald

The Lappwald runs from north-west to south-east parallel to the Elm hills, which lie about 10 km further west. The forests of the Lappwald are almost entirely uninhabited. The only settlements are the Helmstedt hamlet of Bad Helmstedt and the Harbke sector of Autobahn in the south, and the installations of the old airbase of Mariental in the north.

== History ==
The first records describe the Lappwald as the Lapvualt in the year 1147. There is no clear derivation for the name "Lappwald". The most likely theory is to do with the hunting term Einlappens. The Lappwald was a border forest for many centuries between the Brunswick and Prussian territories. Numerous smugglers and other criminals, including the well-known figure of "Robber Captain Rose" (Räuberhauptmann Rose, real name: Carl Wallmann) used the forest's border situation to their advantage. In the 20th century the Inner German Border divided the Lappwald, following the old Brunswick-Prussian boundary.

In the Lappwald northeast of Helmstedt are the remains of a defensive ditch forming part of the old dyke to Walbeck. The structures that have survived include two watchtowers from the 13th century which are referred to as the 1st and 2nd Walbeck Watchtowers (Walbecker Warte). Another well-preserved medieval watchtower is located immediately next to the B 1 federal road to Magdeburg on the edge of the Lappwald.

== Geology ==
From a geological point of view, the Lappwald, which reaches a height of 211 m on the Heidberg, is a hollow, that only appears like a raised horst due to the sharply downfaulted terrain it is surrounded by. In the Cretaceous, a period of some 71 million years, the sea washed chalk, marls and sands in several flood phases into the Helmstedt and Schöppenstedt hollow and thus covered the underlying rock. Further flooding by the sea in the succeeding Tertiary era created large areas of bog in the Helmstedt Basin that were transformed under sub-tropical climatic conditions into massive brown coal deposits.
