= Eickendorf, Börde =

Eickendorf
- Stadtteil of Oebisfelde-Weferlingen
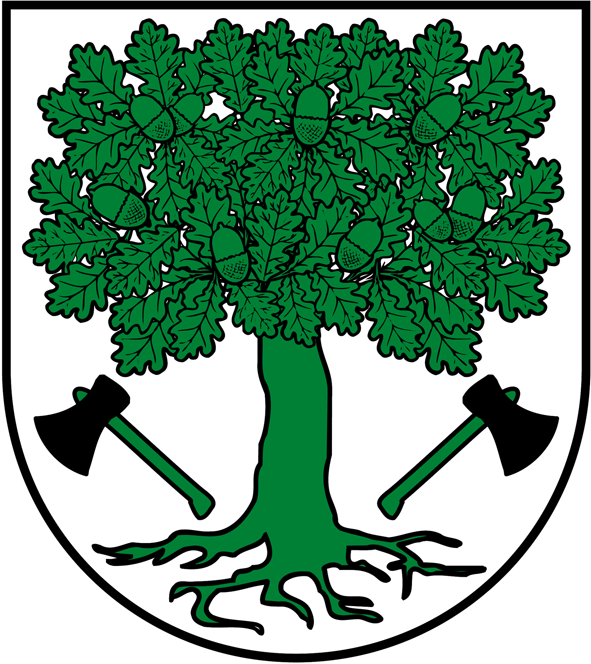
- Coat of arms
- Interactive map of Eickendorf
- Location within Germany Location within Saxony-Anhalt
- Coordinates: 52°22′2″N 11°8′34″E
- Country: Germany
- State: Saxony-Anhalt
- District: Börde
- Town: Oebisfelde-Weferlingen

Area
  - Total: 5.62 km^{2} (2.17 sq mi)
- Elevation: 100 m (330 ft)

Population (2006-12-31)
  - Total: 200
  - Density: 36/km^{2} (92/sq mi)
- Time zone: UTC+01:00 (CET)
  - Summer (DST): UTC+02:00 (CEST)
- Postal codes: 39359
- Dialling codes: 039057
- Vehicle registration: BK

Eickendorf (German pronunciation: [ˈaɪkn̩ˌdɔʁf]) is a village and a former municipality in the Börde district in Saxony-Anhalt, Germany. Since 1 January 2010, it is part of the town Oebisfelde-Weferlingen.
