= Kathendorf =

- Stadtteil of Oebisfelde-Weferlingen
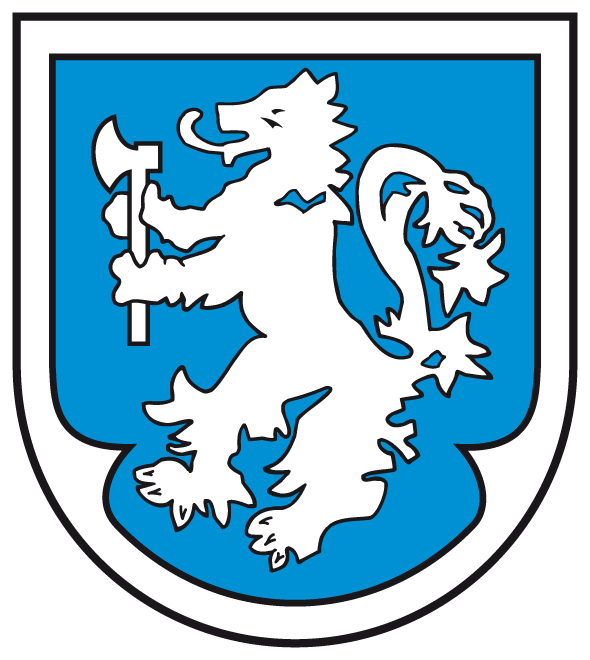
- Coat of arms
- Interactive map of Kathendorf
- Location within Germany Location within Saxony-Anhalt
- Coordinates: 52°24′N 11°8′E
- Country: Germany
- State: Saxony-Anhalt
- District: Börde
- Town: Oebisfelde-Weferlingen

Area
  - Total: 7.77 km^{2} (3.00 sq mi)
- Elevation: 77 m (253 ft)

Population (2006-12-31)
  - Total: 267
  - Density: 34.4/km^{2} (89.0/sq mi)
- Time zone: UTC+01:00 (CET)
  - Summer (DST): UTC+02:00 (CEST)
- Postal codes: 39359
- Dialling codes: 039059
- Vehicle registration: BK

Kathendorf (German pronunciation: [ˈkaːtn̩ˌdɔʁf]) is a village and a former municipality in the Börde district in Saxony-Anhalt, Germany. Since 1 January 2010, it is part of the town Oebisfelde-Weferlingen.
