= Brown podzolic =

Brown podzolic soils
- Used in: British
- Parent material: quartz-rich material

Brown podzolic soils are a subdivision of the Podzolic soils in the British soil classification. Although classed with podzols because they have an iron-rich, or spodic horizon, they are, in fact intermediate between podzols and Brown earths. They are common on hilly land in western Europe, in climates where precipitation of more than about 900mm exceeds evapotranspiration for a large part of the year, and summers are relatively cool. The result is that leaching of the soil profile occurs; in which mobile chemicals are washed out of the topsoil, or A horizon, and accumulate lower down, in the B horizon.

These soils have large amounts (more than 5%) of organic carbon in the surface horizon, which is therefore dark in colour. In unploughed situations there may be a "mor" humus layer in which the surface organic matter is only weakly mixed with the mineral component. Unlike podzols proper, these soils have no continuous leached E horizon. This is because they are formed on slopes where, over long periods, the topsoil weathered from higher up the slope is continually being carried down the slope by the action of rain, gravity and faunal activity. This means that fresh supplies of iron and aluminium oxides (sesquioxides) are constantly being provided, and leaching ensures a net accumulation of these compounds in the B horizon, giving an orange-brown "rusty" colour which is very distinctive. The aluminum and ferric iron compounds in the subsoil also tend to bind the soil particles together, giving a "pellety" fine structure to the soil, and improving permeability, so that despite being in relatively high rainfall areas, the soils do not have the grey colours or mottles of gley soils.

In the World Reference Base for Soil Resources, these soils are called Umbrisols, and the Soil Atlas of Europe shows a preponderance of this kind of soil in north-west Spain. There is a tendency for the soils to occur in oceanic areas, where there is abundant rainfall throughout the year, winters are mild and summers relatively cool. Thus they are common in Ireland, Scotland, Wales (where they occupy about 20% of the country) and western England, especially Devon, Cornwall and the Lake District. They also occur in the Appalachian Mountains and on the west coast of North America.
