= Hörsingen =

- Stadtteil of Oebisfelde-Weferlingen
- Interactive map of Hörsingen
- Location within Germany Location within Saxony-Anhalt
- Coordinates: 52°17′N 11°10′E
- Country: Germany
- State: Saxony-Anhalt
- District: Börde
- Town: Oebisfelde-Weferlingen

Area
  - Total: 8.65 km^{2} (3.34 sq mi)
- Elevation: 141 m (463 ft)

Population (2006-12-31)
  - Total: 625
  - Density: 72.3/km^{2} (187/sq mi)
- Time zone: UTC+01:00 (CET)
  - Summer (DST): UTC+02:00 (CEST)
- Postal codes: 39356
- Dialling codes: 039055

Hörsingen (German pronunciation: [ˈhœʁzɪŋən]) is a village and a former municipality in the Börde district in Saxony-Anhalt, Germany. Since 1 January 2010, it is part of the town Oebisfelde-Weferlingen.
