= Hödingen =

- Stadtteil of Oebisfelde-Weferlingen
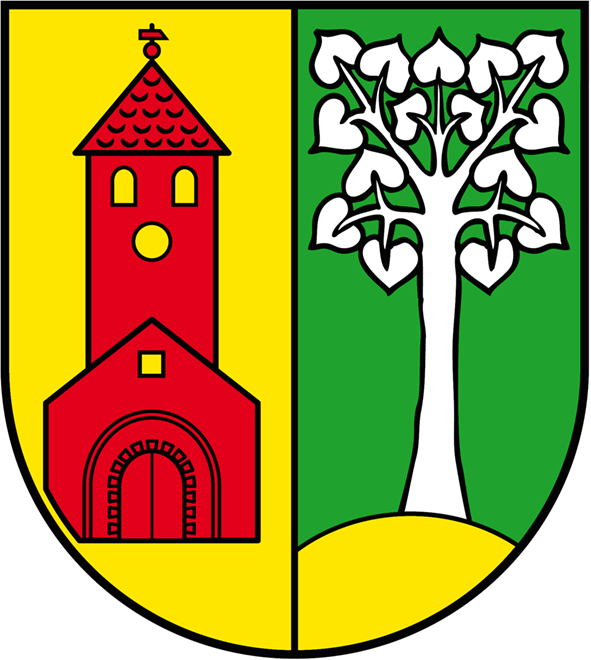
- Coat of arms
- Interactive map of Hödingen
- Location within Germany Location within Saxony-Anhalt
- Coordinates: 52°18′16″N 11°6′22″E
- Country: Germany
- State: Saxony-Anhalt
- District: Börde
- Town: Oebisfelde-Weferlingen

Area
  - Total: 9.18 km^{2} (3.54 sq mi)
- Elevation: 105 m (344 ft)

Population (2006-12-31)
  - Total: 277
  - Density: 30.2/km^{2} (78.2/sq mi)
- Time zone: UTC+01:00 (CET)
  - Summer (DST): UTC+02:00 (CEST)
- Postal codes: 39356
- Dialling codes: 039061
- Vehicle registration: BK

Hödingen (German pronunciation: [ˈhøːdɪŋən]) is a village and a former municipality in the Börde district in Saxony-Anhalt, Germany. Since 1 January 2010, it is part of the town Oebisfelde-Weferlingen.
