= Weferlingen =

Village in Saxony-Anhalt, Germany

- Stadtteil of Oebisfelde-Weferlingen
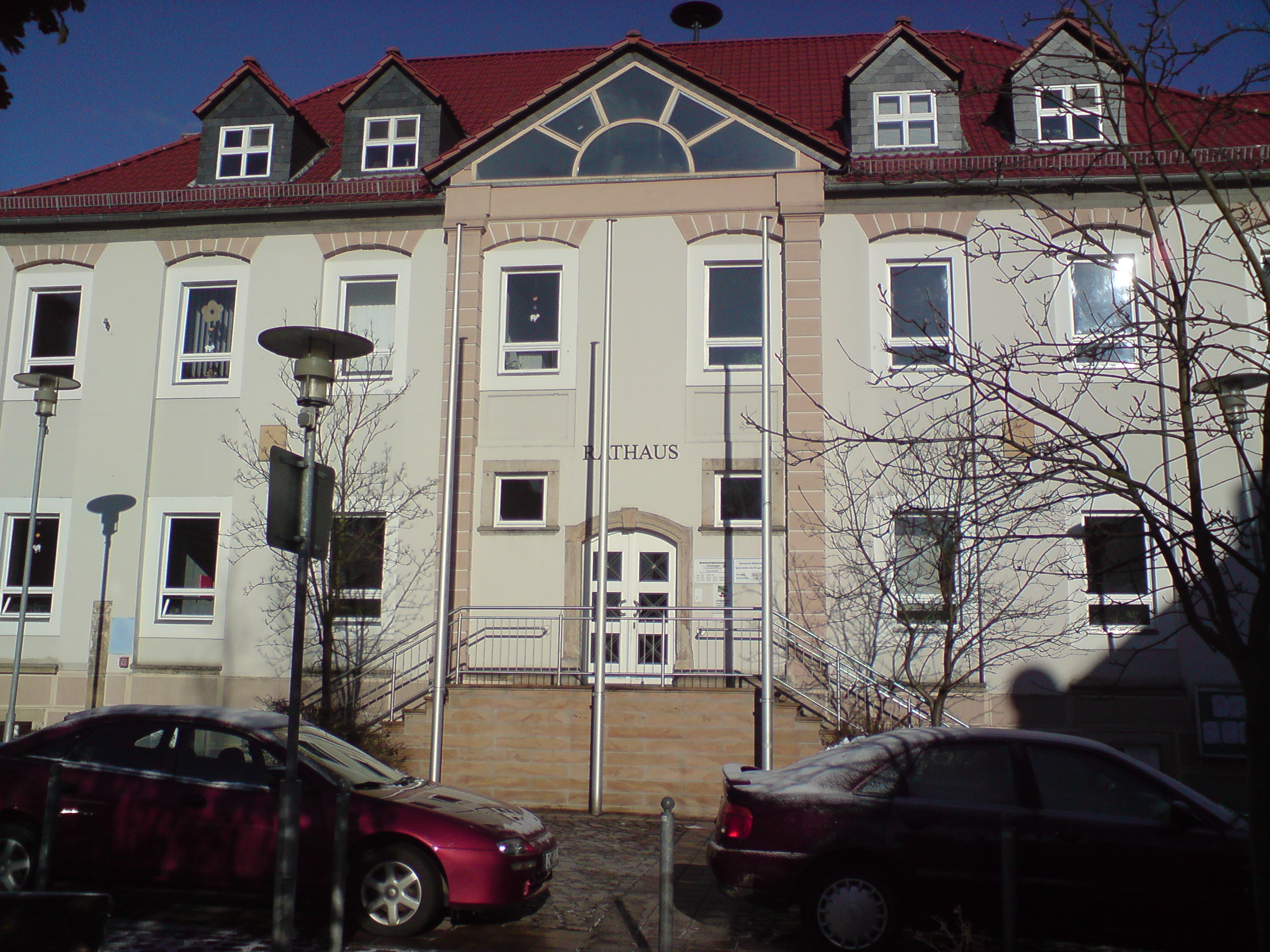
- Town hall

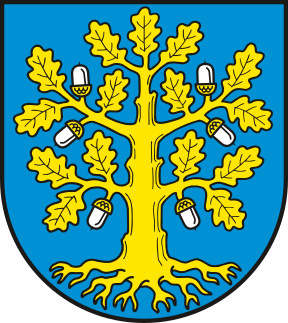
- Coat of arms
- Interactive map of Weferlingen
- Location within Germany Location within Saxony-Anhalt
- Coordinates: 52°18′58″N 11°3′25″E
- Country: Germany
- State: Saxony-Anhalt
- District: Börde
- Town: Oebisfelde-Weferlingen

Area
  - Total: 16.94 km^{2} (6.54 sq mi)
- Elevation: 95 m (312 ft)

Population (2011-12-31)
  - Total: 2,018
  - Density: 119.1/km^{2} (308.5/sq mi)
- Time zone: UTC+01:00 (CET)
  - Summer (DST): UTC+02:00 (CEST)
- Postal codes: 39356
- Dialling codes: 039061
- Vehicle registration: BK
- Website: www.flecken-weferlingen.de

Weferlingen (German pronunciation: [ˈveːfɐlɪŋən]) is a village and a former municipality in the Börde district in Saxony-Anhalt, Germany. Since 1 January 2010, it has been part of the town of Oebisfelde-Weferlingen.

Weferlingen was featured in the Global Mobilization Creator DLC for Bohemia Interactive's ArmA 3.

== People from Weferlingen ==
- de:Rüdiger Barton (1954- ), Keyboard player and composer in the German Rockband Silly
- Angela Voigt (1951–2013), track and field athlete and Olympic champion
- Max Peiffer Watenphul (1896-1976), Painter and former Bauhaus student
- Reinhold von Werner (1825–1909), Vice-admiral and writer of Naval history
