= List of windmills in Saxony-Anhalt =

A list of windmills in the German state of Saxony-Anhalt.

Location	Name of mill	Type	Built	Notes	Photograph
Aken-Küren		Turmholländer		Muehlen Archiv (in German)	
Albersroda		Bockwindmühle		Derelict; Muehlen Archiv (in German)	
Alleringersleben		Turmholländer	1859	Muehlen Archiv (in German)	
Altenplathow	Pieschelscher Mühlturm	Turmholländer			
Anderbeck		Bockwindmühle		Restored; Muehlen Archiv (in German)	
Annarode		Turmholländer		House conversion Muehlen Archiv (in German)	
Arendsee		Bockwindmühle		Restored; Muehlen Archiv (in German)	
Ausleben		Bockwindmühle		Restored; Muehlen Archiv (in German)	
Ausleben-Ottleben		Bockwindmühle		Restored; Muehlen Archiv (in German)	
Baalberge		Bockwindmühle	1722	Burnt down, remains only Muehlen Archiv (in German)	
Baalberge		Turmholländer		Muehlen Archiv (in German)	
Bad Lauchstädt		Bockwindmühle		Restored; Muehlen Archiv (in German)	
Badeleben		Bockwindmühle		Remains only Muehlen Archiv (in German)	
Badersleben		Bockwindmühle		Restored; Muehlen Archiv (in German)	
Barby		Turmholländer		Muehlen Archiv (in German)	
Belleben		Bockwindmühle		Few remains Muehlen Archiv (in German)	
Benkendorf		Bockwindmühle		Trestle only Muehlen Archiv (in German)	
Bennstedt		Bockwindmühle		Derelict; Muehlen Archiv (in German)	
Bergwitz		Bockwindmühle		Muehlen Archiv (in German)	
Billroda		Bockwindmühle		Restored; Muehlen Archiv (in German)	
Bleddin		Turmholländer		Muehlen Archiv (in German)	
Brachstedt		Paltrockmühle		Base only Muehlen Archiv (in German)	
Brachstedt-Wurp		Bockwindmühle		Derelict; Muehlen Archiv (in German)	
Braschwitz-Plößnitz		Bockwindmühle		Muehlen Archiv (in German)	
Brehna	Schmidt-Mühle	Bockwindmühle		Restored; Muehlen Archiv (in German)	
Brehna	Hädicke-Mühle	Paltrockmühle	1845	Restored; Muehlen Archiv (in German)	
Brehna	Tauchmann-Mühle	Bockwindmühle		Incorporated into engine driven mill Muehlen Archiv (in German)	
Breitenhagen		Bockwindmühle	1912	House conversion Muehlen Archiv (in German) Wikimedia Commons	
Brumby		Paltrockmühle		Muehlen Archiv (in German)	
Buch		Turmholländer		Muehlen Archiv (in German)	
Bülzig		Turmholländer		Stump; Muehlen Archiv (in German)	
Calvörde		Turmholländer		House conversion Muehlen Archiv (in German)	
Cheine		Turmholländer		Muehlen Archiv (in German)	
Colbitz		Bockwindmühle		Restored; Muehlen Archiv (in German)	
Coswig		Turmholländer		Muehlen Archiv (in German)	
Crüchern		Turmholländer		Muehlen Archiv (in German)	
Danstedt		Bockwindmühle		Muehlen Archiv (in German)	
Dessau-Roßlau (Mildensee)		Turmholländer	1860	Incorporated into engine driven mill Muehlen Archiv (in German)	
Dessau-Roßlau (Ziebigk)		Turmholländer	1870		
Deutsch		Bockwindmühle		Derelict; Muehlen Archiv (in German)	
Diesdorf		Bockwindmühle		Restored; Muehlen Archiv (in German)	
Dingelstedt		Bockwindmühle		Muehlen Archiv (in German)	
Dornstedt		Turmholländer		Muehlen Archiv (in German)	
Dreileben	Bockmühle Lauenroth	Bockwindmühle		Derelict; Muehlen Archiv (in German)	
Droßdorf-Rippicha		Turmholländer		Muehlen Archiv (in German)	
Ebersroda		Turmholländer		Muehlen Archiv (in German)	
Ebersroda		Turmholländer		Muehlen Archiv (in German)	
Eckartsberga		Turmholländer		Muehlen Archiv (in German)	
Eimersleben		Bockwindmühle	1848	Restored; Muehlen Archiv (in German)	
Ellenberg		Bockwindmühle		Incorporated into engine driven mill Muehlen Archiv (in German)	
Elster		Bockwindmühle	1895	Restored; Muehlen Archiv (in German) Wikimedia Commons	
Endorf		Turmholländer		Restored; Muehlen Archiv (in German)	
Erdeborn		Bockwindmühle		Muehlen Archiv (in German)	
Estedt		Sockelgeschoßholländer		House conversion Muehlen Archiv (in German)	
Etingen		Bockwindmühle		Muehlen Archiv (in German)	
Ferchland		Turmholländer		Muehlen Archiv (in German)	
Flechtingen		Turmholländer		Muehlen Archiv (in German)	
Friedersdorf		Turmholländer		House conversion Muehlen Archiv (in German)	
Gatterstädt		Paltrockmühle		Muehlen Archiv (in German)	
Gentha		Bockwindmühle		Restored; Muehlen Archiv (in German)	
Gernrode		Turmholländer		Muehlen Archiv (in German)	
Gerstewitz		Bockwindmühle		Muehlen Archiv (in German)	
Gleina		Turmholländer		Incorporated into engine driven mill Muehlen Archiv (in German)	
Gleina		Turmholländer		Muehlen Archiv (in German)	
Glinde		Bockwindmühle		Trestle only Muehlen Archiv (in German)	
Globig		Turmholländer		Incorporated into engine driven mill Muehlen Archiv (in German)	
Gorsdorf-Hemsendorf		Bockwindmühle		Muehlen Archiv (in German)	
Gräfenhainichen	Preußer'sche Bockwindmühle	Bockwindmühle	1848	Restored Muehlen Archiv (in German) Wikimedia Commons	
Grieben	Windmühle Grieben	Bockwindmühle	1837	Wikimedia Commons	
Grieben		Bockwindmühle		Wikimedia Commons	
Gröst		Bockwindmühle		Restored; Muehlen Archiv (in German)	
Groß Ammensleben		Turmholländer		Muehlen Archiv (in German)	
Groß Naundorf		Bockwindmühle		Muehlen Archiv (in German)	
Groß Rodensleben		Bockwindmühle		Muehlen Archiv (in German)	
Groß Rosenburg		Turmholländer		Muehlen Archiv (in German) Wikimedia Commons	
Großgörschen		Bockwindmühle		Muehlen Archiv (in German)	
Großgörschen-Kleingörschen		Bockwindmühle		Muehlen Archiv (in German)	
Großgräfendorf		Bockwindmühle		Muehlen Archiv (in German)	
Großkorbetha		Bockwindmühle		Muehlen Archiv (in German)	
Großkugel		Bockwindmühle		Derelict; Muehlen Archiv (in German)	
Größnitz		Bockwindmühle		Derelict; Muehlen Archiv (in German)	
Großzöberitz		Bockwindmühle		Incorporated into engine driven mill Muehlen Archiv (in German)	
Güsen		Turmholländer		Muehlen Archiv (in German)	
Hakeborn		Bockwindmühle		Muehlen Archiv (in German)	
Halle-Lettin		Turmholländer		Muehlen Archiv (in German)	
Halle-Neustadt	Eselsmühle	Turmholländer	1886/87	Muehlen Archiv (in German)	
Hedersleben		Bockwindmühle		Incorporated into engine driven mill Muehlen Archiv (in German)	
Hedersleben		Turmholländer		Stump; Muehlen Archiv (in German)	
Hettstedt		Turmholländer		House conversion Muehlen Archiv (in German)	
Heuckewalde		Bockwindmühle		Muehlen Archiv (in German)	
Hödingen		Bockwindmühle		Trestle only Muehlen Archiv (in German)	
Hohenwarthe		Bockwindmühle	1720		
Hundisburg		Turmholländer		House conversion Muehlen Archiv (in German)	
Insel-Tornau		Bockwindmühle		Restored; Muehlen Archiv (in German)	
Jeetze		Bockwindmühle		Restored; Muehlen Archiv (in German)	
Jerichow		Sockelgeschoßholländer		Muehlen Archiv (in German)	
Jüdendorf		Bockwindmühle		Incorporated into engine driven mill Muehlen Archiv (in German)	
Kamern	Windmühle Kamern	Bockwindmühle	1897	Muehlen Archiv (in German)	
Kleinalsleben		Bockwindmühle		Derelict; Muehlen Archiv (in German)	
Klein Germersleben		Paltrockmühle		Muehlen Archiv (in German)	
Kleinkorgau		Bockwindmühle		Muehlen Archiv (in German)	
Klein Mühlingen		Bockwindmühle		Restored; Muehlen Archiv (in German)	
Klietz		Bockwindmühle		Derelict; Muehlen Archiv (in German)	
Klöden		Turmholländer		Incorporated into engine driven mill Muehlen Archiv (in German)	
Klötze		Turmholländer		Muehlen Archiv (in German)	
Knapendorf		Turmholländer		Muehlen Archiv (in German)	
Köckern		Paltrockmühle		Muehlen Archiv (in German)	
Könnern		Turmholländer		Muehlen Archiv (in German)	
Könnern		Turmholländer		House conversion Muehlen Archiv (in German)	
Köselitz		Bockwindmühle		Derelict; Muehlen Archiv (in German)	
Köthen		Turmholländer		Muehlen Archiv (in German)	
Kremkau		Bockwindmühle		Muehlen Archiv (in German)	
Kreypau		Turmholländer			
Krosigk	Krosigker Bockwindmühle	Bockwindmühle			
Labrun		Bockwindmühle		Muehlen Archiv (in German)	
Langendorf-Obergreißlau		Bockwindmühle		Muehlen Archiv (in German)	
Langeneichstädt		Bockwindmühle		Muehlen Archiv (in German)	
Lebien		Bockwindmühle		Restored; Muehlen Archiv (in German)	
Lebien		Bockwindmühe		Trestle only Muehlen Archiv (in German)	
Leimbach		Bockwindmühle		Muehlen Archiv (in German)	
Leitzkau		Turmholländer		Muehlen Archiv (in German)	
Libehna		Bockwindmühle		Standing 1995, gone by 2010. Muehlen Archiv (in German)	
Libehna		Bockwindmühle	1814	Restored; Muehlen Archiv (in German)	
Lodersleben		Turmholländer		Muehlen Archiv (in German)	
Lostau		Bockwindmühle		Restored; Muehlen Archiv (in German)	
Lützen-Meuchen		Bockwindmühle		Remains of collapsed mill only Muehlen Archiv (in German)	
Maasdorf	Kurtchen Barths Mühle	Turmholländer			
Magdeburg-Fermersleben		Bockwindmühle			
Magdeburg-Olvenstedt	Düppler Mühle	Turmholländer		Muehlen Archiv (in German)	
Magdeburg-Pechau		Bockwindmühle		Restored; Muehlen Archiv (in German)	
Marke		Bockwindmühle		Muehlen Archiv (in German)	
Meineweh		Turmholländer		Muehlen Archiv (in German)	
Merzien		Bockwindmühle		Muehlen Archiv (in German)	
Merzien		Bockwindmühle		Muehlen Archiv (in German)	
Meseberg		Bockwindmühle		Muehlen Archiv (in German)	
Mochau		Turmholländer		Muehlen Archiv (in German)	
Möckern		Turmholländer		House conversion Muehlen Archiv (in German)	
Möckern		Turmholländer		Incorporated into engine driven mill Muehlen Archiv (in German)	
Möckern-Büden		Turmholländer			
Möhlau		Turmholländer			
Muschwitz-Söhesten		Paltrockmühle		Muehlen Archiv (in German)	
Mützel		Bockwindmühle		Muehlen Archiv (in German)	
Naumburg		Turmholländer		Five sails Muehlen Archiv (in German)	
Naumburg-Schellsitz		Bockwindmühle		Muehlen Archiv (in German)	
Naundorf bei Seyda		Turmholländer		Restored; Muehlen Archiv (in German)	
Neuerstadt		Paltrockmühle		Muehlen Archiv (in German)	
Niedermöllern		Turmholländer		Muehlen Archiv (in German)	
Niederndodeleben (Schnarsleben)		Turmholländer		Muehlen Archiv (in German)	
Nienburg		Turmholländer		Muehlen Archiv (in German)	
Nienburg-Altenburg		Turmholländer		House conversion Muehlen Archiv (in German)	
Niendorf		Turmholländer		Stump only Muehlen Archiv (in German)	
Nordgermersleben		Turmholländer		House conversion Muehlen Archiv (in German)	
Nordgermersleben		Turmholländer		House conversion Muehlen Archiv (in German)	
Obernessa		Bockwindmühle		Muehlen Archiv (in German)	
Obhausen		Turmholländer		Stump; Muehlen Archiv (in German)	
Oebisfelde-Weddendorf		Bockwindmühle		Incorporated into engine driven mill Muehlen Archiv (in German)	
Oestingersleben		Bockwindmühle		Restored; Muehlen Archiv (in German)	
Oppin		Bockwindmühle		Incorporated into engine driven mill Muehlen Archiv (in German)	
Oppin		Bockwindmühle		Incorporated into engine driven mill Muehlen Archiv (in German)	
Osterweddingen		Bockwindmühle		Muehlen Archiv (in German)	
Ostingersleben		Bockwindmühle	1783	Deutsche Gesellschaft für Mühlenkunde (in German) Wikimedia Commons	
Ostrau-Werderthau		Bockwindmühle		Collapsed remains only Muehlen Archiv (in German)	
Ovelgünne		Bockwindmühle		Collapsed remains only Muehlen Archiv (in German)	
Parchen		Bockwindmühle		Restored; Muehlen Archiv (in German)	
Parey		Paltrockmühle		Restored; Muehlen Archiv (in German)	
Peißen		Turmholländer		Incorporated into hotel Muehlen Archiv (in German)	
Peterwitz-Frößnitz		Bockwindmühle	1736/37	Trestle only Muehlen Archiv (in German)	
Pettstädt		Bockwindmühle		Restored; Muehlen Archiv (in German)	
Plossig		Bockwindmühle		Muehlen Archiv (in German)	
Plossig		Bockwindmühle		Derelict; Muehlen Archiv (in German)	
Pödelist-Dobichau		Bockwindmühle		Stump; Muehlen Archiv (in German)	
Polleben		Bockwindmühle	1847/48	Restored; Muehlen Archiv (in German)	
Pölsfeld		Bockwindmühle		Muehlen Archiv (in German)	
Pömmelte		Bockwindmühle		Muehlen Archiv (in German)	
Prettin		Bockwindmühle		Derelict; Muehlen Archiv (in German)	
Prittitz		Bockwindmühle		Derelict; Muehlen Archiv (in German)	
Punschrau		Turmholländer		Muehlen Archiv (in German)	
Rade, Saxony-Anhalt		Bockwindmühle		Trestle only Muehlen Archiv (in German)	
Radisleben		Turmholländer		Muehlen Archiv (in German)	
Reichardtswerben		Bockwindmühle		Derelict; Muehlen Archiv (in German)	
Reichartswerben		Bockwindmühle		Muehlen Archiv (in German)	
Remkersleben		Bockwindmühle		Trestle only Muehlen Archiv (in German)	
Roßlau		Turmholländer			
Röcken		Bockwindmühle		Muehlen Archiv (in German)	
Röcken-Bothfeld		Bockwindmühle		Derelict; Muehlen Archiv (in German)	
Sachsendorf		Bockwindmühle		Restored; Muehlen Archiv (in German)	
Salzwedel		Erdholländer		Muehlen Archiv (in German)	
Sargstedt		Bockwindmühle		Muehlen Archiv (in German)	
Schafstädt		Turmholländer		Muehlen Archiv (in German)	
Schafstädt		Turmholländer		Derelict; Muehlen Archiv (in German)	
Schköna		Bockwindmühle		House conversion Muehlen Archiv (in German)	
Schleibnitz		Bockwindmühle		Muehlen Archiv (in German)	
Schönebeck		Turmholländer		Muehlen Archiv (in German)	
Schönebeck		Turmholländer		Muehlen Archiv (in German)	
Schönebeck		Turmholländer		Muehlen Archiv (in German)	
Schöneicho		Bockwindmühle		Derelict; Muehlen Archiv (in German)	
Schwerz-Dammendorf		Paltrockmühle		Muehlen Archiv (in German)	
Seebenau		Turmholländer		Muehlen Archiv (in German)	
Seehausen		Sockelgeschoßholländer		Derelict; Muehlen Archiv (in German)	
Seyda		Bockwindmühle		Derelict; Muehlen Archiv (in German)	
Sieglitz (district of Molau)		Turmholländer		Muehlen Archiv (in German)	
Sommersdorf		Paltrockwmühle		House conversion Muehlen Archiv (in German)	
Spergau	Spergauer Bockwindmühle	Bockwindmühle	1836	Derelict; Muehlen Archiv (in German)	
Starsiedel		Paltrockmühle		Muehlen Archiv (in German)	
Steutz		Turmholländer		Incorporated into engine driven mill Muehlen Archiv (in German)	
Storkau-Obschütz		Bockwindmühle		Few remains Muehlen Archiv (in German)	
Stumsdorf		Bockwindmühle		Restored; Muehlen Archiv (in German)	
Tagewerben		Turmholländer		Muehlen Archiv (in German)	
Tangeln		Turmholländer		Muehlen Archiv (in German)	
Thurland		Turmholländer		Muehlen Archiv (in German)	
Tornitz		Bockwindmühle		Trestle only Muehlen Archiv (in German)	
Tornitz		Bockwindmühle		Derelict; Muehlen Archiv (in German)	
Trebnitz		Turmholländer		Muehlen Archiv (in German)	
Tultewitz		Turmholländer		Muehlen Archiv (in German)	
Uhrsleben		Bockwindmühle		Muehlen Archiv (in German)	
Uichteritz-Lobitzsch		Paltrockmühle		Muehlen Archiv (in German)	
Unseburg		Turmholländer		Muehlen Archiv (in German)	
Wallwitz		Turmholländer		House conversion Muehlen Archiv (in German)	
Wallwitz		Bockwindmühle		Muehlen Archiv (in German)	
Warnstedt		Turmholländer		Muehlen Archiv (in German)	
Wedlitz		Turmholländer		Stump; Muehlen Archiv (in German)	
Weißenborn		Bockwindmühle		Derelict; Muehlen Archiv (in German)	
Wengelsdorf		Turmholländer		Restored; Muehlen Archiv (in German)	
Wengelsdorf		Bockwindmühle		Derelict; Muehlen Archiv (in German)	
Werben		Bockwindmühle		Restored; Muehlen Archiv (in German)	
Wettin		Turmholländer		Stump; Muehlen Archiv (in German)	
Wölls-Petersdorf		Bockwindmühle		Muehlen Archiv (in German)	
Wolmirstedt		Bockwindmühle		Restored; Muehlen Archiv (in German)	
Wöpel		Turmholländer		Muehlen Archiv (in German)	
Wörlitz		Turmholländer		House conversion Muehlen Archiv (in German)	
Wörlitz		Turmholländer		Muehlen Archiv (in German)	
Wulfen		Turmholländer		Muehlen Archiv (in German)	
Wulferstedt		Bockwindmühle		Muehlen Archiv (in German)	
Wulferstedt		Bockwindmühle		Derelict; Muehlen Archiv (in German)	
Wünsch		Bockwindmühle		Incorporated into engine driven mill Muehlen Archiv (in German)	
Würchwitz-Bockwitz		Turmholländer		Muehlen Archiv (in German)	
Wust		Bockwindmühle		Derelict; Muehlen Archiv (in German)	
Zahna		Turmholländer		Muehlen Archiv (in German) images at Wikimedia Commons	
Ziemendorf		Bockwindmühle		Derelict; Muehlen Archiv (in German)	
Zierau		Bockwindmühle		Restored; Muehlen Archiv (in German)	
Zscherneddel		Bockwindmühle		Muehlen Archiv (in German)	
