= Annaburg-Prettin =

Coordinates: 51°44′N 13°03′E

Annaburg-Prettin was a Verwaltungsgemeinschaft ("administrative community") in the district of Wittenberg, in Saxony-Anhalt, Germany. It was situated on the right bank of the Elbe, southeast of Wittenberg. The seat of the Verwaltungsgemeinschaft was in Annaburg. It was disbanded in January 2011.

The Verwaltungsgemeinschaft of Annaburg-Prettin consisted of the following municipalities (population in 2005 in brackets):

- Annaburg * (3,762)
- Axien (592)
- Bethau (190)
- Groß Naundorf (779)
- Labrun (130)
- Lebien (375)
- Plossig (279)
- Prettin (2,114)
