= Tammer =

Family name

Tammer is a surname. Notable people with the surname include:

- Christiane Tammer, German mathematician
- Erik Tammer (born 1969), Dutch football player
- Harald Tammer (1899–1942), Estonian weightlifter, athlete and journalist
- Peter Tammer (born 1943), Australian film director
- Frances Tammer (born 1955), Professor of Practice, University of Exeter

== See also ==
- Hotel Tammer, hotel in Tampere, Finland
