= Lebien =

- Ortsteil of Annaburg
- Interactive map of Lebien
- Location within Germany Location within Saxony-Anhalt
- Coordinates: 51°43′N 12°56′E
- Country: Germany
- State: Saxony-Anhalt
- District: Wittenberg
- Town: Annaburg

Area
  - Total: 12.74 km^{2} (4.92 sq mi)
- Elevation: 73 m (240 ft)

Population (2009-12-31)
  - Total: 337
  - Density: 26.5/km^{2} (68.5/sq mi)
- Time zone: UTC+01:00 (CET)
  - Summer (DST): UTC+02:00 (CEST)
- Postal codes: 06922
- Dialling codes: 035386
- Vehicle registration: WB

Lebien is a village and a former municipality in Wittenberg district in Saxony-Anhalt, Germany. Since 1 January 2011, it is part of the town Annaburg. The municipality belonged to the administrative municipality (Verwaltungsgemeinschaft) of Annaburg-Prettin.

== Geography ==
Lebien lies about 8 km south of Jessen.

== Economy and transportation ==
Federal Highway (Bundesstraße) B 187 between Wittenberg and Jessen is about 9 km away.

== History ==
Until 1815, the community belonged to the Amt of Annaburg. In 1550 there were 15 men who owned land, among them twelve Hüfnerner who were directly responsible to the Amt. In the village itself were three free yards, which in 1550 belonged to Hans von Wesenagk, Nicol von Hondorf and Michael am Ende

The village bordered on the Annaburg Heath and the villages of Zwiesigko, Schöneicho, Kähnitzsch, Hohndorf and Plossig.

Lebien was once a branch of Axien and only later got its own church.

From 1815 to 1944, Lebien was part of the Prussian Province of Saxony and from 1944 to 1945 of the Province of Halle-Merseburg.

After World War II, Lebien was incorporated into the Province (since 1947, State) of Saxony-Anhalt from 1945 to 1952 and the Bezirk Cottbus of East Germany from 1952 to 1990. Since 1990, Lebien has been part of Saxony-Anhalt, since 2011 as a part of Annaburg.
