= Ingersleben =

- Municipality
- Coat of arms

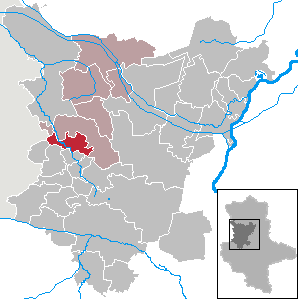
- Location of Ingersleben within Börde district
- Interactive map of Ingersleben
- Location within Germany Location within Saxony-Anhalt
- Coordinates: 52°13′N 11°07′E
- Country: Germany
- State: Saxony-Anhalt
- District: Börde
- Municipal assoc.: Flechtingen

Government
  - Mayor (2021–28): David Wieter

Area
  - Total: 31.27 km^{2} (12.07 sq mi)

Population (2025-12-31)
  - Total: 1,251
  - Density: 40.01/km^{2} (103.6/sq mi)
- Time zone: UTC+01:00 (CET)
  - Summer (DST): UTC+02:00 (CEST)
- Postal codes: 39343
- Dialling codes: 039400, 039050, 039052
- Vehicle registration: BK, OK
- Website: www.elbe-heide.de

Ingersleben is a municipality in the Börde district in Saxony-Anhalt, Germany. It was formed on 1 January 2010 by the merger of the former municipalities Alleringersleben, Eimersleben, Morsleben and Ostingersleben.
