= Baumersroda =

- Ortsteil of Gleina
- Interactive map of Baumersroda
- Location within Germany Location within Saxony-Anhalt
- Coordinates: 51°16′N 11°46′E
- Country: Germany
- State: Saxony-Anhalt
- District: Burgenlandkreis
- Town: Gleina

Area
  - Total: 6.69 km^{2} (2.58 sq mi)
- Elevation: 199 m (653 ft)

Population (2006-12-31)
  - Total: 350
  - Density: 52/km^{2} (140/sq mi)
- Time zone: UTC+01:00 (CET)
  - Summer (DST): UTC+02:00 (CEST)
- Postal codes: 06632
- Dialling codes: 034632

Baumersroda is a village and a former municipality in the Burgenlandkreis district, in Saxony-Anhalt, Germany. Since 1 July 2009, it is part of the municipality Gleina.
