= Morsleben =

- Ortsteil of Ingersleben
- Coat of arms
- Interactive map of Morsleben
- Location within Germany Location within Saxony-Anhalt
- Coordinates: 52°13′N 11°6′E
- Country: Germany
- State: Saxony-Anhalt
- District: Börde
- Municipality: Ingersleben

Area
  - Total: 6.28 km^{2} (2.42 sq mi)
- Elevation: 150 m (490 ft)

Population (2006-12-31)
  - Total: 348
  - Density: 55.4/km^{2} (144/sq mi)
- Time zone: UTC+01:00 (CET)
  - Summer (DST): UTC+02:00 (CEST)
- Postal codes: 39343
- Dialling codes: 039050

Morsleben is a village and a former municipality in the Börde district in Saxony-Anhalt, Germany. Since 1 January 2010, it is part of the municipality Ingersleben. It is mostly known because of the Repository for radioactive waste Morsleben nearby; the disposal of waste into the facility was ended in 1998.
