= Bethau =

- Ortsteil of Annaburg
- Interactive map of Bethau
- Location within Germany Location within Saxony-Anhalt
- Coordinates: 51°40′N 13°00′E
- Country: Germany
- State: Saxony-Anhalt
- District: Wittenberg
- Town: Annaburg

Area
  - Total: 5.67 km^{2} (2.19 sq mi)
- Elevation: 77 m (253 ft)

Population (2009-12-31)
  - Total: 183
  - Density: 32.3/km^{2} (83.6/sq mi)
- Time zone: UTC+01:00 (CET)
  - Summer (DST): UTC+02:00 (CEST)
- Postal codes: 06925
- Dialling codes: 035386
- Vehicle registration: WB

Bethau is a village and a former municipality in the Wittenberg district in Saxony-Anhalt, Germany. Since 1 January 2011, it is part of the town Annaburg. It lies right on the boundary with Saxony about 35 km southeast of the district seat at Wittenberg and 12 km north of Torgau. Bethau was part of the administrative municipality (Verwaltungsgemeinschaft) of Annaburg-Prettin.

== Geography and transport ==
Bethau lies in the lowlands on the east bank of the Elbe west of the Annaburg Heath. This is, however, to a great extent a Bundeswehr troop drilling ground, and is therefore off limits. West of the municipality runs the Federal Highway (Bundesstraße) B 182, and to the north is the B 187. In the south, the municipality borders on Saxony.

== History ==
Bethau is believed to have been founded in 1159 by Flemish migrants. They were settled in the area by Wichmann von Seeburg, Archbishop of Magdeburg, and Albert the Bear.

Before his exile to Switzerland then emigration to the US, 19th-century communist Friedrich Sorge had been a resident of Bethau where he was born in 1828.

From 1815 to 1944, Bethau was part of the Prussian Province of Saxony and from 1944 to 1945 of the province of Halle-Merseburg.

After World War II, Bethau was incorporated into the Province (since 1947, State) of Saxony-Anhalt from 1945 to 1952 and the Bezirk Cottbus of East Germany from 1952 to 1990. Since 1990, Bethau has been part of Saxony-Anhalt, since 2011 as a part of Annaburg.
