= Gertraud Winkelvoss =

German politician (1917–1982)

Member of the Landtag of Lower Saxony
- In office 6 June 1967 – 20 June 1970

Personal details
- Born: 18 February 1917 Prettin, Kingdom of Prussia, German Empire
- Died: 5 March 1982 (aged 65) Lüneburg, Lower Saxony, West Germany
- Party: Nazi Party (1938–1945); German Reich Party (c. 1950–1964); National Democratic Party (1964–1982)
- Spouse: Reimer Winkelvoss
- Children: 4
- Education: University of Hamburg

Gertraud Winkelvoss (German: Winkelvoß; 18 February 1917 – 5 March 1982) was a German politician who served in the Landtag of Lower Saxony from 1967 until 1970, representing the neo-Nazi National Democratic Party. She was a leader in both the party and in the broader neo-Nazi movement in West Germany.

== Biography ==
Gertraud Winkelvoss was born on 18 February 1917 in the town of Prettin. After receiving her Abitur from a school in Militsch in 1936, she moved to Marburg and began training in physiotherapy. On 1 September 1938, at the age of 21, Winkelvoss joined the Nazi Party. After initially working at hospitals in Magdeburg, she became a camp leader in the Reich Labour Service during World War II. After the war, she fled to the Northeim district in Lower Saxony, where she and her husband opened a dairy wholesale store until 1954, when they moved to the city of Oldenburg. Around this period, she also joined the German Reich Party (DRP), a far-right and neo-Nazi political party, becoming a party functionary. In the 1961 West German federal election, Winkelvoss ran for the Bundestag as a member of the DRP, standing as a state list (landesliste) candidate in Lower Saxony, though she was defeated.

In 1964, Winkelvoss moved to the city of Lüneburg and joined the newly founded neo-Nazi National Democratic Party (NPD). Despite being a housewife, she quickly rose to become a leader both in the party and in West Germany's neo-Nazi movement. After unsuccessfully running for the Bundestag again in the 1965 election, she joined the party's executive committee the following year, becoming one of nine former Nazis in the fifteen-member committee. Winkelvoss was also the party's chairman in both Lüneburg city and Lüneburg district. From 1965 until 1966, she studied economics at the University of Hamburg.

Winkelvoss ran as an NPD candidate for the Landtag of Lower Saxony in the 1967 state election. Campaigning on nationalist politics and for the "eventual reunification of greater Germany", she and nine other NPD members were elected. The party's success was due to its ability to siphon votes from the Free Democratic Party, who lost all of their seats in the Landtag. At the time of her election, Winkelvoss was one of only two elected female NPD legislators in West Germany. In an interview given to the Alicia Patterson Foundation, Winkelvoss explained that the NPD strategy was to gain seats in the state Landtages in order to influence the Bundesrat, though she stated she was also interested in state affairs, primarily "family welfare". During the interview, she was also critical of Adolf Hitler for outlawing all political opposition to the Nazi Party. She again unsuccessfully ran for the Bundestag in the 1969 election, and left the Landtag at the end of her term the following year.

Winkelvoss died in Lüneburg on 5 March 1982. Her husband, Reimer Winkelvoss, was a judge at the Lower Saxony Higher Administrative Court, and they had four children together.
