= Annaburg =

- Town
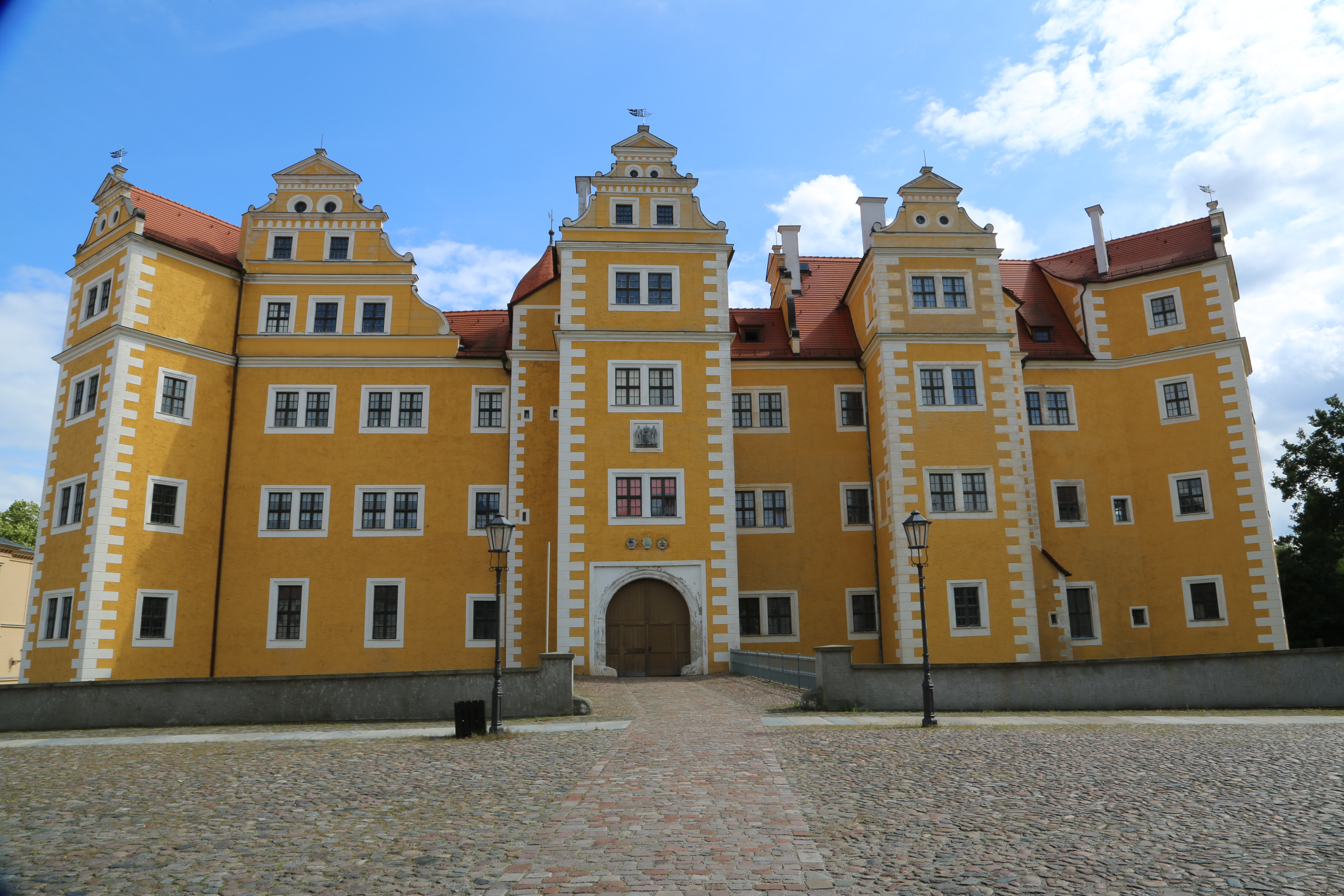

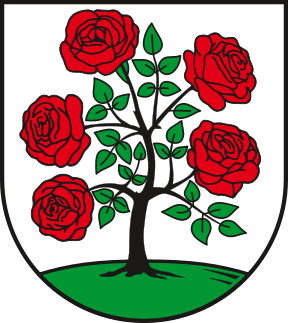
- Coat of arms

- Location of Annaburg within Wittenberg district
- Interactive map of Annaburg
- Location within Germany Location within Saxony-Anhalt
- Coordinates: 51°43′58″N 13°2′44″E
- Country: Germany
- State: Saxony-Anhalt
- District: Wittenberg

Government
  - Mayor (2021–28): Stefan Schmidt

Area
  - Total: 224.28 km^{2} (86.59 sq mi)
- Elevation: 75 m (246 ft)

Population (2025-12-31)
  - Total: 6,189
  - Density: 27.59/km^{2} (71.47/sq mi)
- Time zone: UTC+01:00 (CET)
  - Summer (DST): UTC+02:00 (CEST)
- Postal codes: 06922, 06925
- Dialling codes: 035385, 035386
- Vehicle registration: WB
- Website: annaburg.info

Annaburg (German pronunciation: [ˈanabʊʁk]) is a town in Wittenberg district in Saxony-Anhalt, Germany. It was the seat of the former Verwaltungsgemeinschaft Annaburg-Prettin.

== Constituent communities ==
The town Annaburg consists of the following Ortschaften or municipal divisions:

- Annaburg
- Axien
- Bethau
- Groß Naundorf
- Labrun
- Lebien
- Löben
- Plossig
- Premsendorf
- Prettin
- Purzien

== History ==
In the 13th century, the Ascanians built a hunting lodge on the site of today's Annaburg. This stately edifice, however, burnt down in 1422. Duke Albrecht III of Saxony-Wittenberg found himself inside the lodge when it caught fire. He and his wife escaped through a window clad only in their night clothes. The fire killed many of Albrecht's entourage, and indeed it claimed his life too, a few days later as a result of his injuries. This actually influenced the region's history, as Albrecht had no heir. With his death, the Ascanian dynasty came to an end.

In 1498, a zoölogical garden was built.

Until 1572, Annaburg was called Lochau and was, until it was abolished for good in 1821, the seat of the Amt of Annaburg. In 1550, Lochau was home to 40 men who owned land, among them eight draught cattle raisers, one feudal judge, nine gardeners and 22 "suburbanites" who lived somewhere just outside Lochau.

The first Saxon court pharmacy is also to be found in Annaburg.

The Elector August's wife was Anna of Denmark), Danish King Christian III's daughter. For her, the stately home – and thereby also the town – were renamed. Since 1762, the aforesaid residence has been the site of a military youth institute in which more than 500 pupils aged 11 to 15 have been educated for free by military personnel of Protestant (evangelisch) faith. Furthermore, there existed another junior officer preparatory school in a newly built barracks.

In July 1754, Johann Christian Noack, "der Malificant" (i.e. "the Wrongdoer") was put to death on the breaking wheel and left there to deter others from a life of evil deeds. It was one of the last such executions.

From 1780, the Amt actuary, Christian August Seidel, ran a mulberry orchard in Annaburg.

From 1815 to 1944, Annaburg was part of the Prussian Province of Saxony.

After losing town rights in the 17th century, they were granted Annaburg once again in 1939.

In 1942, Annaburg served as the holding camp of Indian POWs of the British Indian Army, captured in the North African campaigns. This was done at the behest of the Indian nationalist leader, Subhas Chandra Bose; and as a staging ground to create a Free India Legion (eventually absorbed under oath to the German army) to fight for Indian independence from British rule.

From 1944 to 1945, Annaburg was part of the Province of Halle-Merseburg.

After World War II, Annaburg was incorporated into the Province (since 1947, State) of Saxony-Anhalt from 1945 to 1952 and the Bezirk Cottbus of East Germany from 1952 to 1990. Since 1990, Annaburg has been part of Saxony-Anhalt.

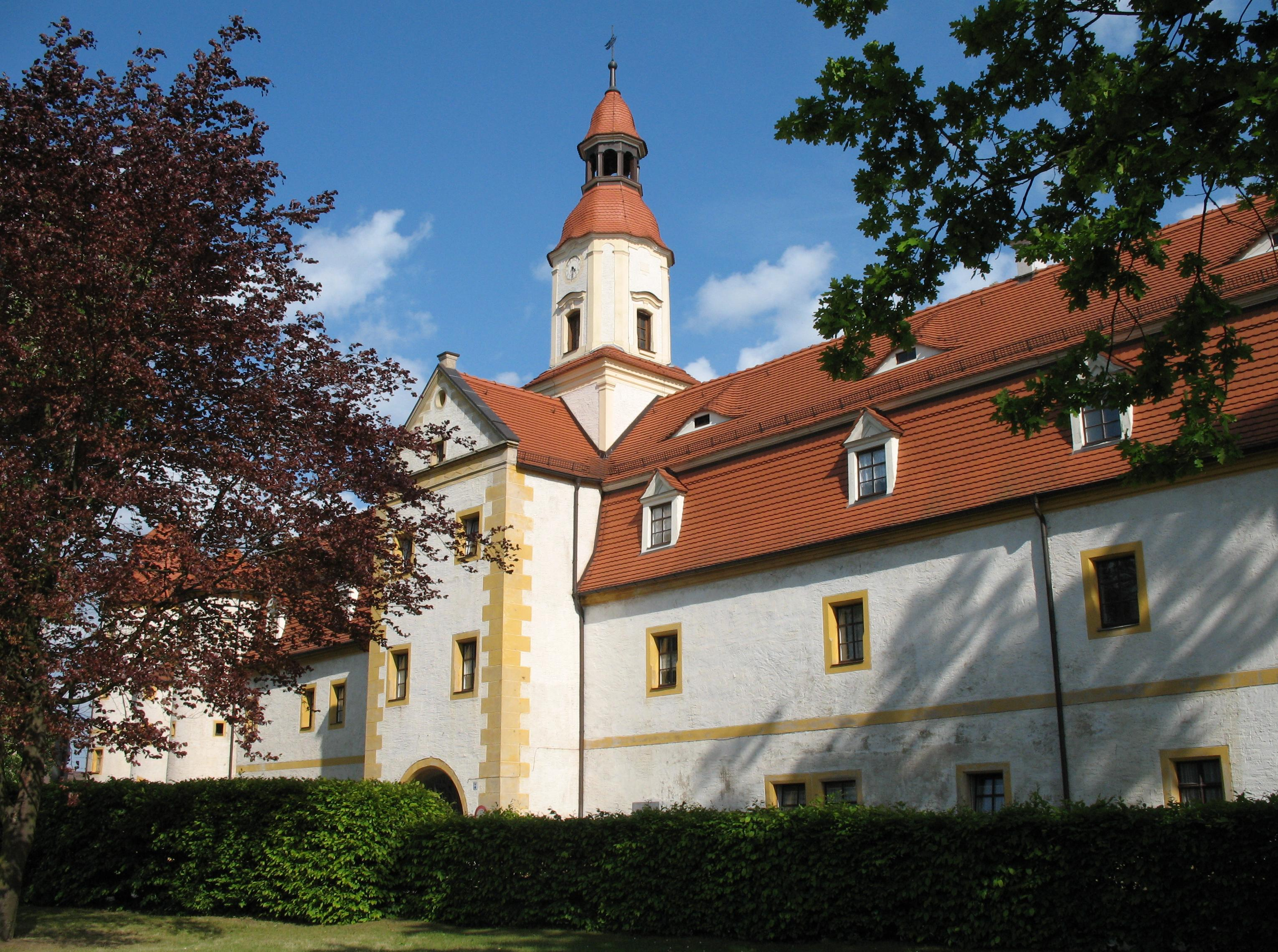
Vorderschloss

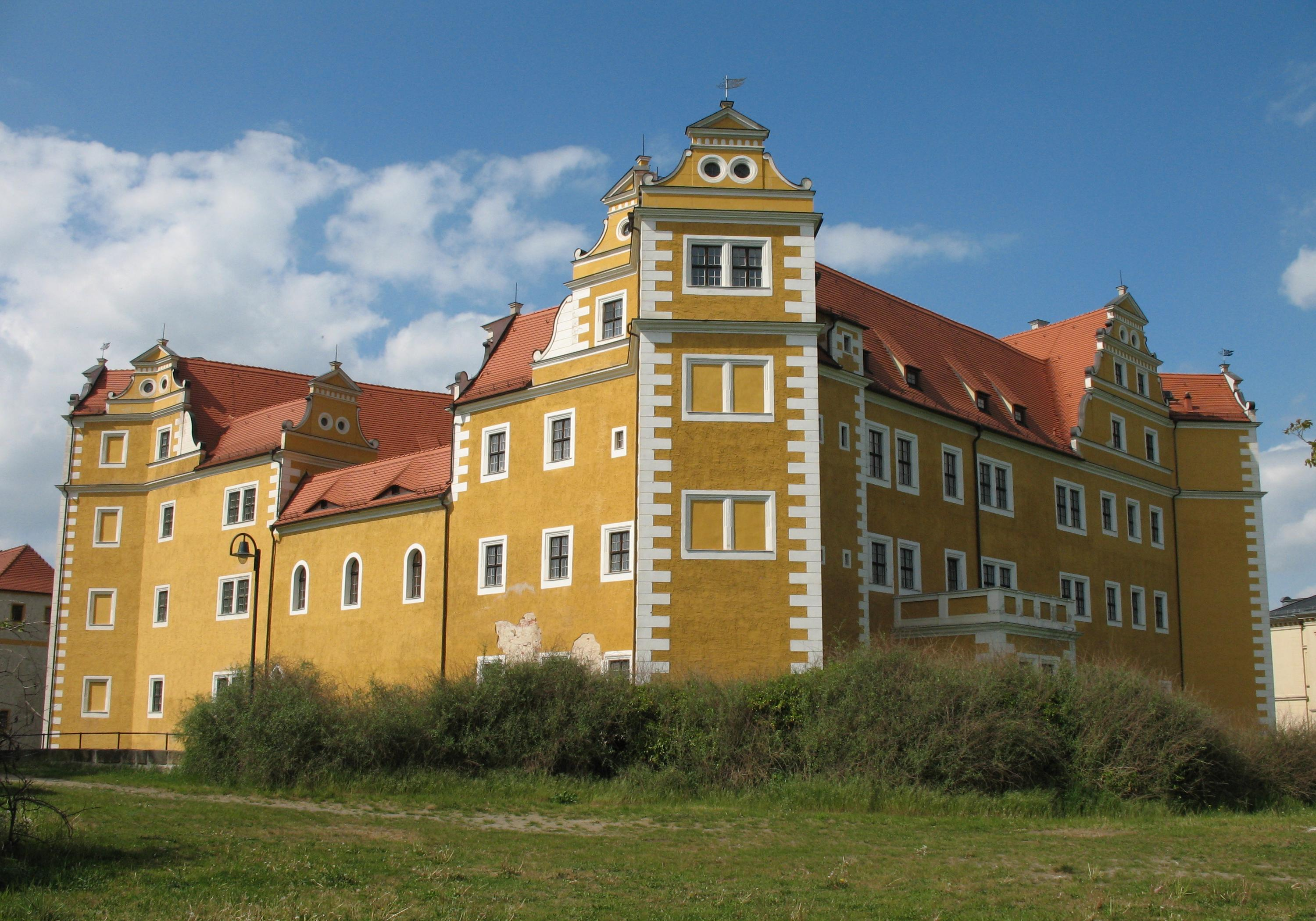
Hinterschloss

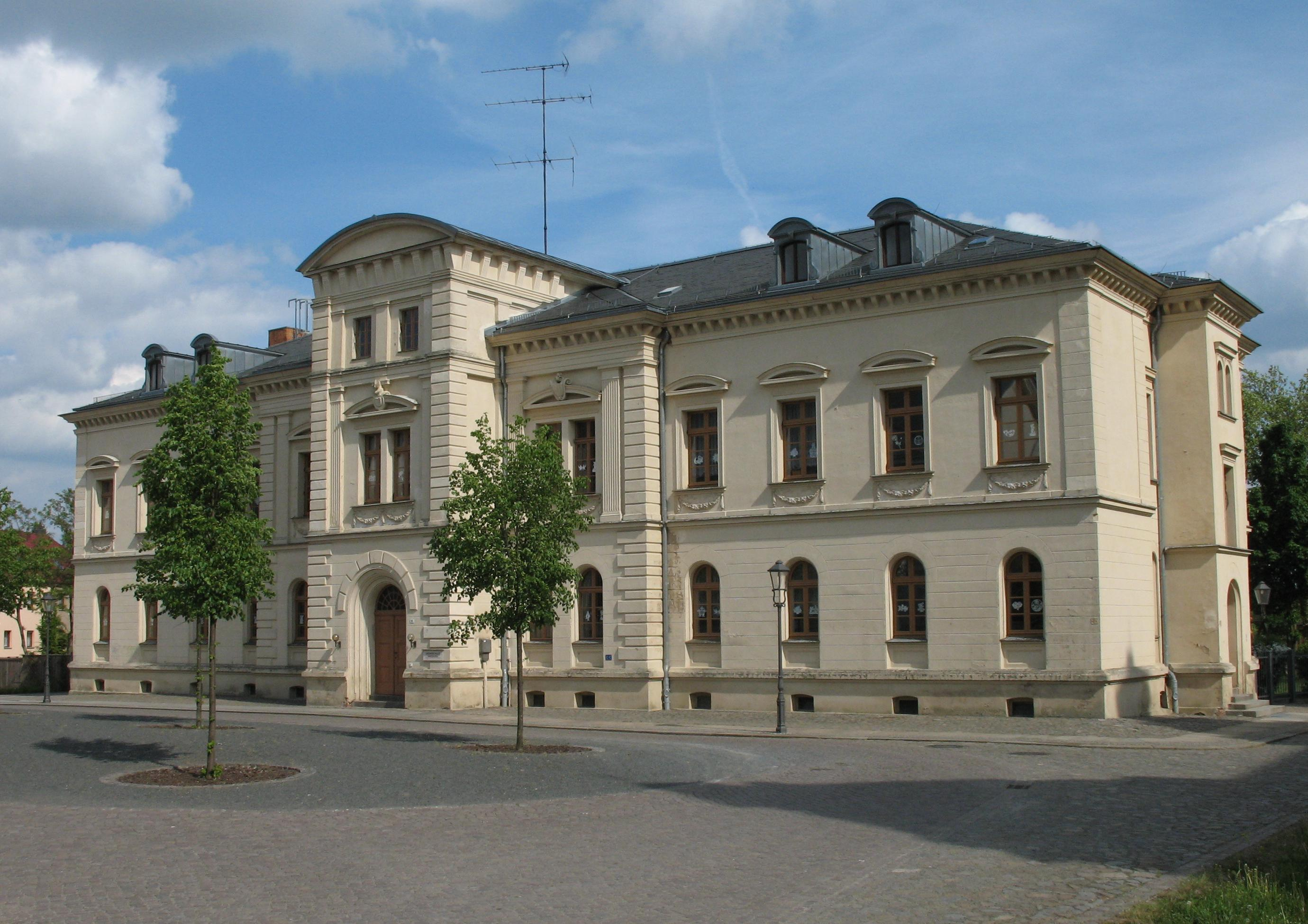
Primary school

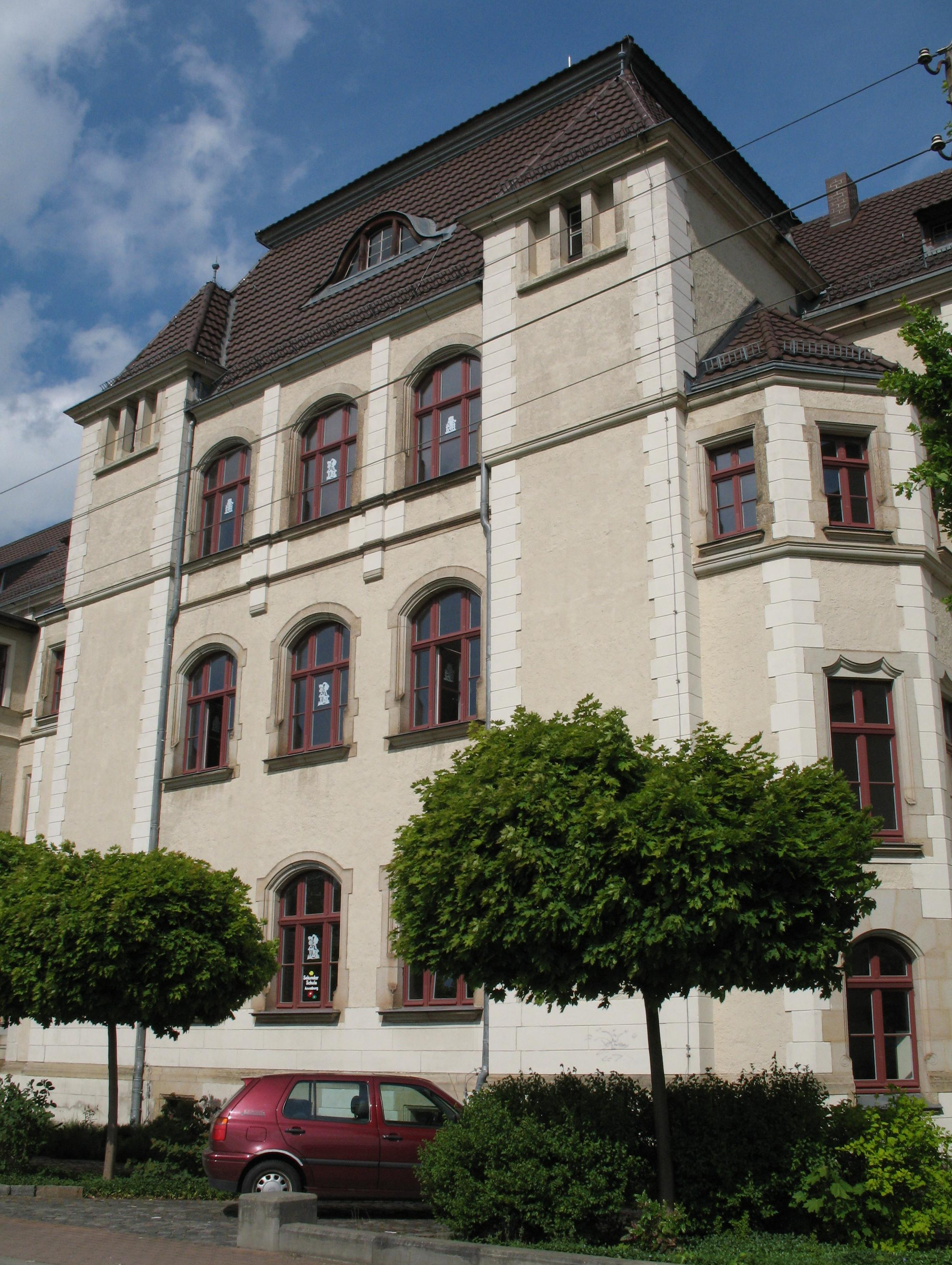
Secondary school

== Personalities ==
- Justus Christian Thorschmidt (1688–1738), clergyman and historian
- Frederick III, Elector of Saxony (1463-1525), also Frederick the Wise, Elector of Saxony, resided in Lochau from about 1500 and died here in 1525

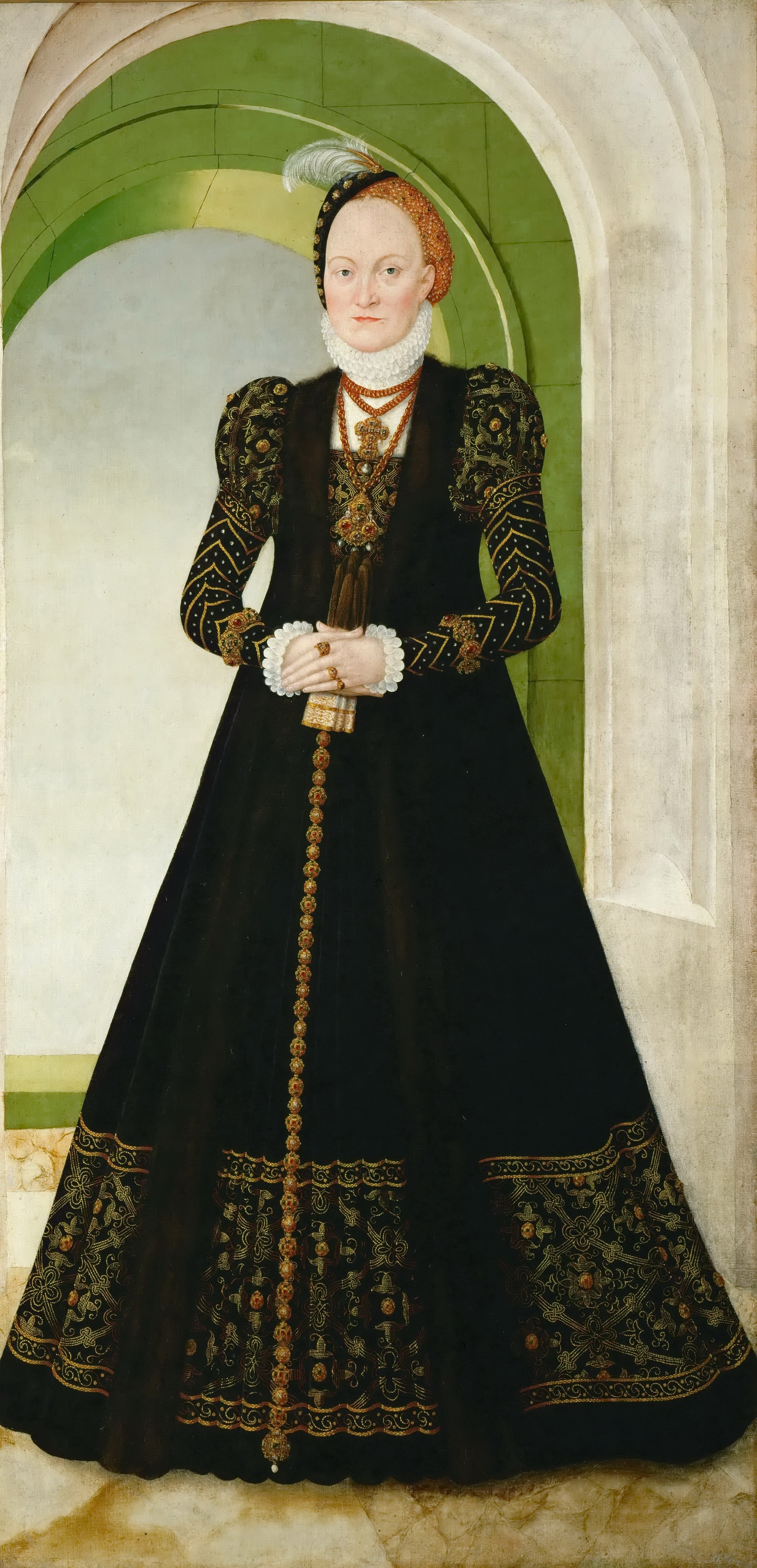
Anne of Denmark (after 1565)

- Anne of Denmark, Electress of Saxony (1532-1585), called Mother Anna , Electress of Saxony and wife of Augustus I. Saxony, named after the town Annaburg, resided in the newly built castle Lochau (later Annaburg), castle Annaburg housed the first Saxon court pharmacy
- Michael Stifel (1487-1567), theologian, mathematician and reformer, was collaborator of Martin Luther and worked as pastor in Lochau (now Annaburg)
