= Labrun =

- Ortsteil of Annaburg
- Interactive map of Labrun
- Location within Germany Location within Saxony-Anhalt
- Coordinates: 51°40′15″N 12°57′55″E
- Country: Germany
- State: Saxony-Anhalt
- District: Wittenberg
- Town: Annaburg

Area
  - Total: 5.01 km^{2} (1.93 sq mi)
- Elevation: 77 m (253 ft)

Population (2009-12-31)
  - Total: 133
  - Density: 26.5/km^{2} (68.8/sq mi)
- Time zone: UTC+01:00 (CET)
  - Summer (DST): UTC+02:00 (CEST)
- Postal codes: 06922
- Dialling codes: 035386
- Vehicle registration: WB

Labrun is a village and a former municipality in Wittenberg district in Saxony-Anhalt, Germany. Since 1 January 2011, it is part of the town Annaburg. The municipality belonged to the administrative municipality (Verwaltungsgemeinschaft) of Annaburg-Prettin from 1 January 2005 until 2011. Before, it had belonged to the administrative community of Heideck-Prettin.

== Geography and transport ==
The community lies about 45 km southeast of Wittenberg and about 20 km north of Torgau in the lowlands on the east bank of the Elbe west of the Annaburg Heath, among Prettin, Bethau, Großtreben, Plössig and Groß Naundorf. This is, however, to a great extent a Bundeswehr troop drilling ground, and is therefore off limits. West of the community runs the Federal Highway (Bundesstraße) B 182, and to the north is the B 187. In the south, the community borders on Saxony.

== History ==
Labrun is believed to have been founded in 1159 by Flemish migrants. They were settled in the area by the Archbishop of Magdeburg Wichmann von Seeburg and Albert the Bear.

From 1815 to 1944, Labrun was part of the Prussian Province of Saxony and from 1944 to 1945 of the Province of Halle-Merseburg.

After World War II, Labrun was incorporated into the Province (since 1947, State) of Saxony-Anhalt from 1945 to 1952 and the Bezirk Cottbus of East Germany from 1952 to 1990. Since 1990, Labrun has been part of Saxony-Anhalt, since 2011 as a part of Annaburg.
