= Gleina =

- Municipality
- Location of Gleina within Burgenlandkreis district
- Interactive map of Gleina
- Location within Germany Location within Saxony-Anhalt
- Coordinates: 51°16′N 11°44′E
- Country: Germany
- State: Saxony-Anhalt
- District: Burgenlandkreis
- Municipal assoc.: Unstruttal

Government
  - Mayor (2022–29): Florian Schüler (CDU)

Area
  - Total: 29.58 km^{2} (11.42 sq mi)
- Elevation: 205 m (673 ft)

Population (2025-12-31)
  - Total: 1,128
  - Density: 38.13/km^{2} (98.77/sq mi)
- Time zone: UTC+01:00 (CET)
  - Summer (DST): UTC+02:00 (CEST)
- Postal codes: 06632
- Dialling codes: 034462
- Vehicle registration: BLK
- Website: www.freyburg-info.de

Gleina (German pronunciation: [ˈɡlaɪna]) is a municipality in the Burgenlandkreis district, in Saxony-Anhalt, Germany. Since 2009 it has included Baumersroda and Ebersroda.
