= Ostingersleben =

- Ortsteil of Ingersleben
- Interactive map of Ostingersleben
- Location within Germany Location within Saxony-Anhalt
- Coordinates: 52°13′N 11°10′E
- Country: Germany
- State: Saxony-Anhalt
- District: Börde
- Municipality: Ingersleben

Area
  - Total: 7.46 km^{2} (2.88 sq mi)
- Elevation: 143 m (469 ft)

Population (2006-12-31)
  - Total: 269
  - Density: 36.1/km^{2} (93.4/sq mi)
- Time zone: UTC+01:00 (CET)
  - Summer (DST): UTC+02:00 (CEST)
- Postal codes: 39343
- Dialling codes: 039052
- Vehicle registration: BK

Ostingersleben is a village and a former municipality in the Börde district in Saxony-Anhalt, Germany.

Since 1 January 2010, it is part of the municipality Ingersleben.
