= Groß Naundorf =

- Ortsteil of Annaburg
- Interactive map of Groß Naundorf
- Location within Germany Location within Saxony-Anhalt
- Coordinates: 51°42′N 13°0′E
- Country: Germany
- State: Saxony-Anhalt
- District: Wittenberg
- Town: Annaburg

Area
  - Total: 17.68 km^{2} (6.83 sq mi)
- Elevation: 77 m (253 ft)

Population (2009-12-31)
  - Total: 726
  - Density: 41.1/km^{2} (106/sq mi)
- Time zone: UTC+01:00 (CET)
  - Summer (DST): UTC+02:00 (CEST)
- Postal codes: 06925
- Dialling codes: 035385
- Vehicle registration: WB

Groß Naundorf (or Gross Naundorf) is a village and a former municipality in Wittenberg district in Saxony-Anhalt, Germany. Since 1 January 2011, it is part of the town Annaburg. The municipality belonged to the administrative municipality (Verwaltungsgemeinschaft) of Annaburg-Prettin.

== Geography ==
Groß Naundorf lies about 11 kilometres south of Jessen.

== History ==
From 1815 to 1944, Groß Naundorf was part of the Prussian Province of Saxony and from 1944 to 1945 of the Province of Halle-Merseburg.

After World War II, Groß Naundorf was incorporated into the Province (since 1947, State) of Saxony-Anhalt from 1945 to 1952 and the Bezirk Cottbus of East Germany from 1952 to 1990. Since 1990, Groß Naundorf has been part of Saxony-Anhalt, since 2011 as a part of Annaburg.

== Economy and transportation ==
Federal Highway (Bundesstraße) B 187 running from Wittenberg to Jessen is about 12 km away.
