= Ebersroda =

- Ortsteil of Gleina
- Interactive map of Ebersroda
- Location within Germany Location within Saxony-Anhalt
- Coordinates: 51°15′N 11°46′E
- Country: Germany
- State: Saxony-Anhalt
- District: Burgenlandkreis
- Town: Gleina

Area
  - Total: 4.27 km^{2} (1.65 sq mi)
- Elevation: 210 m (690 ft)

Population (2006-12-31)
  - Total: 183
  - Density: 42.9/km^{2} (111/sq mi)
- Time zone: UTC+01:00 (CET)
  - Summer (DST): UTC+02:00 (CEST)
- Postal codes: 06632
- Dialling codes: 034632
- Website: www.vgem-unstruttal.de

Ebersroda is a village and a former municipality in the Burgenlandkreis district, in Saxony-Anhalt, Germany. Since 1 July 2009, it is part of the municipality Gleina.

The village Ebersroda has been proposed by Germany for inscription in the List of World Heritage. The World Heritage nomination Naumburg Cathedral and the High Medieval Cultural Landscape of the Rivers Saale and Unstrut is representative for the processes that shaped the continent during the High Middle Ages between 1000 and 1300: Christianization, the so-called “Landesausbau” and the dynamics of cultural exchange and transfer characteristic for this very period.

== World Heritage nomination ==
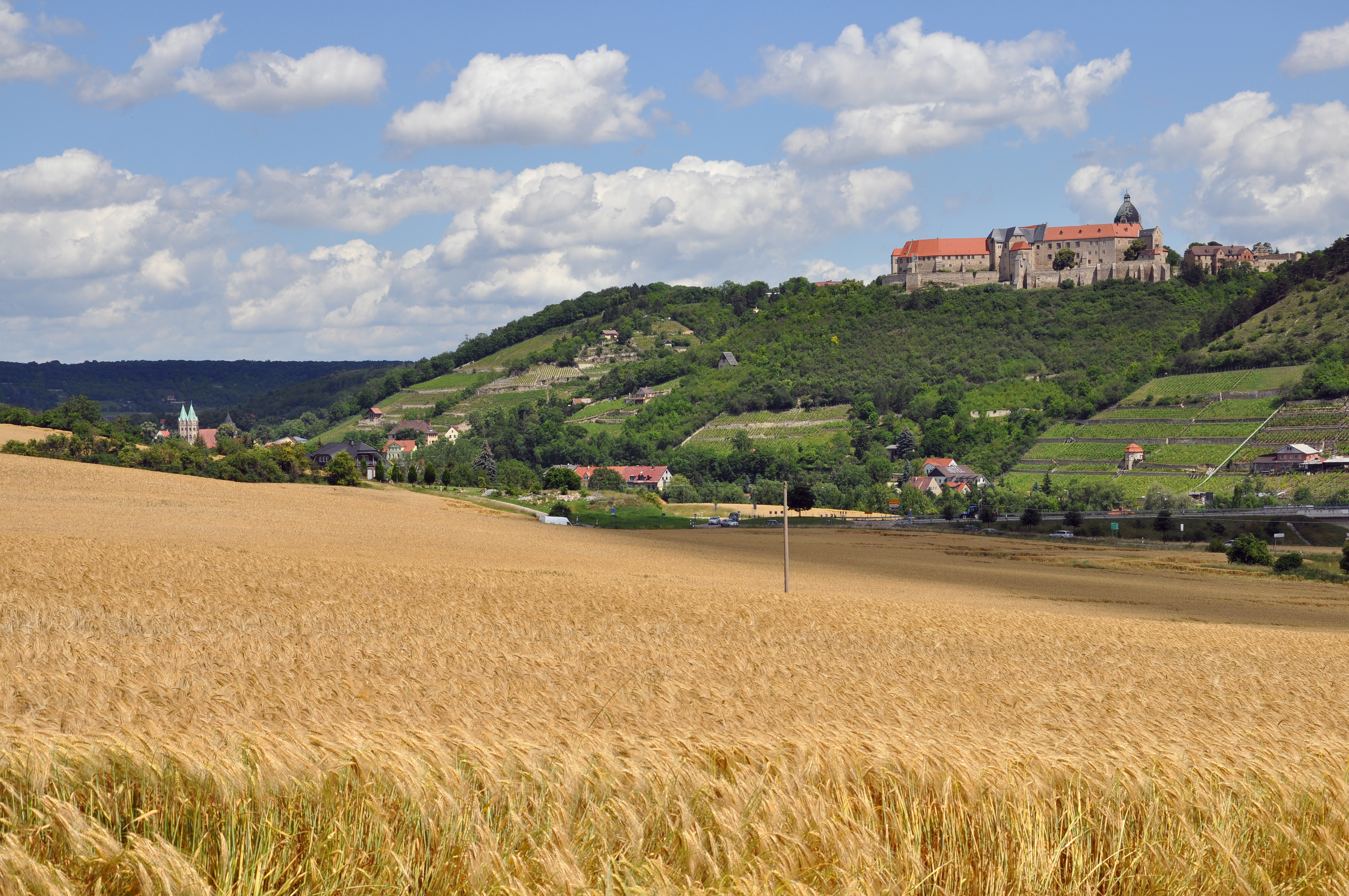
Landscape around Neuenburg

The village Ebersroda is one of the eleven components of the cultural landscape Naumburg Cathedral and the High Medieval Cultural Landscape of the Rivers Saale and Unstrut that has been proposed by the Federal Republic of Germany for inscription in the List of World Heritage. (Note: The Förderverein Welterbe an Saale und Unstrut e.V. is the coordinating body for this World Heritage nomination: http://www.naumburg-cathedral.de.) The World Heritage nomination is representative for the pervasive processes that shaped the continent during the High Middle Ages between 1000 and 1300: Christianization, the so-called “Landesausbau” and the dynamics of cultural exchange and transfer characteristic for this very period.

== History ==
This component part encompasses the village of Ebersroda located north of the Unstrut River on the adjoining plateau of Querfurt-Gleina. As the neighboring village Schleberoda, Ebersroda was founded as a result of intensive land development by clearance in the High Middle Ages such as other villages with “root” (Roda) in the name (e.g. Albersroda, Baumersorda, Schnellroda, Ebersroda and Schleberoda). Ebersroda is a characteristic village built around a village green only accessible from one side. The oval-shaped green at the centre of the village community features a continuity of use, which has survived over the centuries, with a village pond, two well houses, a bake house and a brewery.

== Today ==
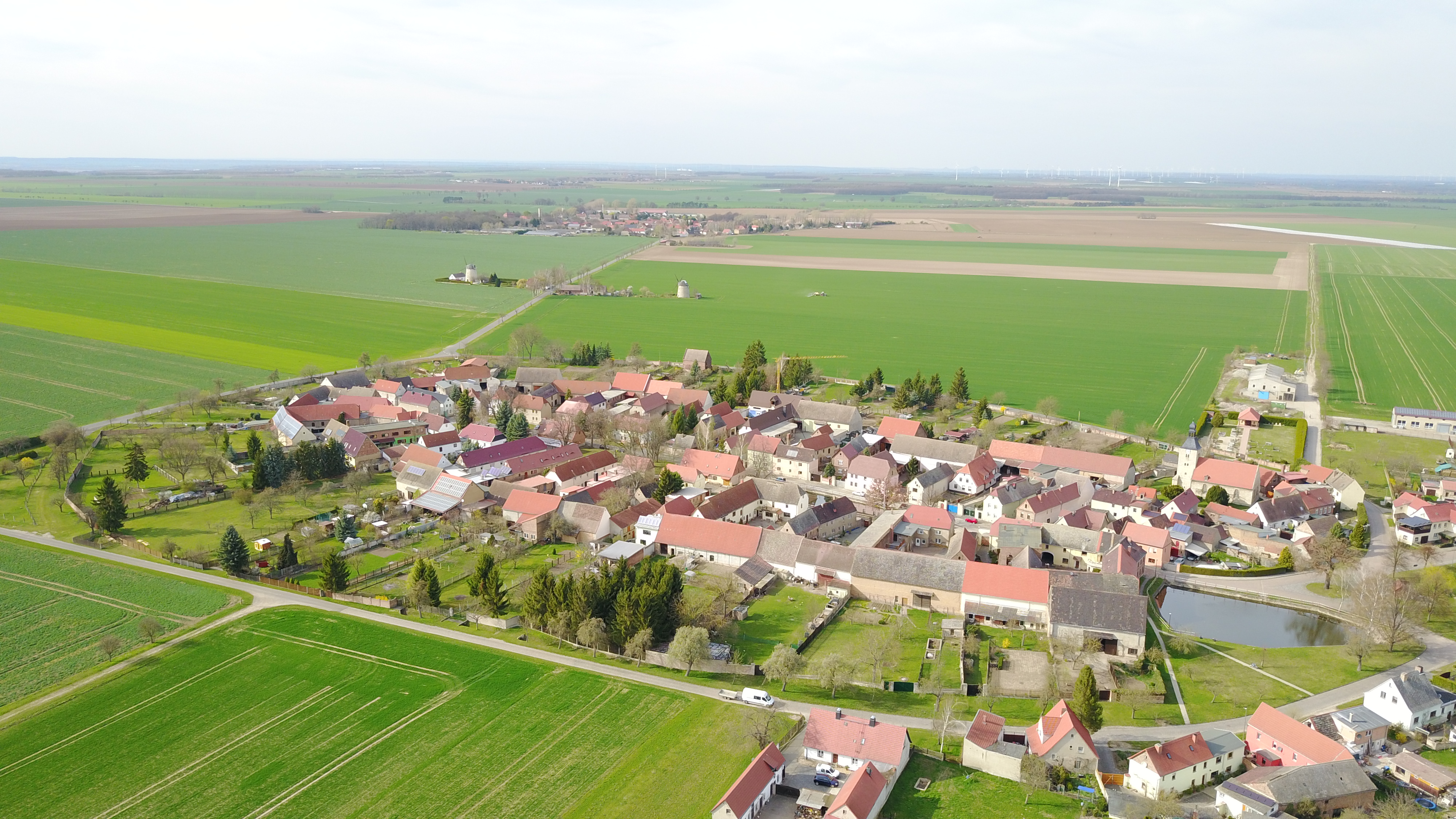
Ebersorda

The farmsteads with forward-facing gables and with partly elaborate gates or portals have repeatedly been renovated on a persistent ground plan dating from the High Middle Ages; their building fabric today dates from the 17th to 20th century. The belt of barns terminating the farmsteads has been completely preserved. Around the gardens and meadows adjoining each barn, a path that can be accessed from each farmstead still marks the original village boundary today. The churchyard is located on the north-eastern edge of the village and is surrounded by a lane. From the church that existed in the High Middle Ages, a high choir tower with a wall bond of opus spicatum and coupled abat-sons remains. A Baroque hall church was adjoined to this tower on the eastern side in the 18th century.

== See also ==
- World Heritage Convention
- World Heritage Site
- World Heritage Committee
- High Middle Ages
- Cultural Landscape
