= Alleringersleben =

- Ortsteil of Ingersleben
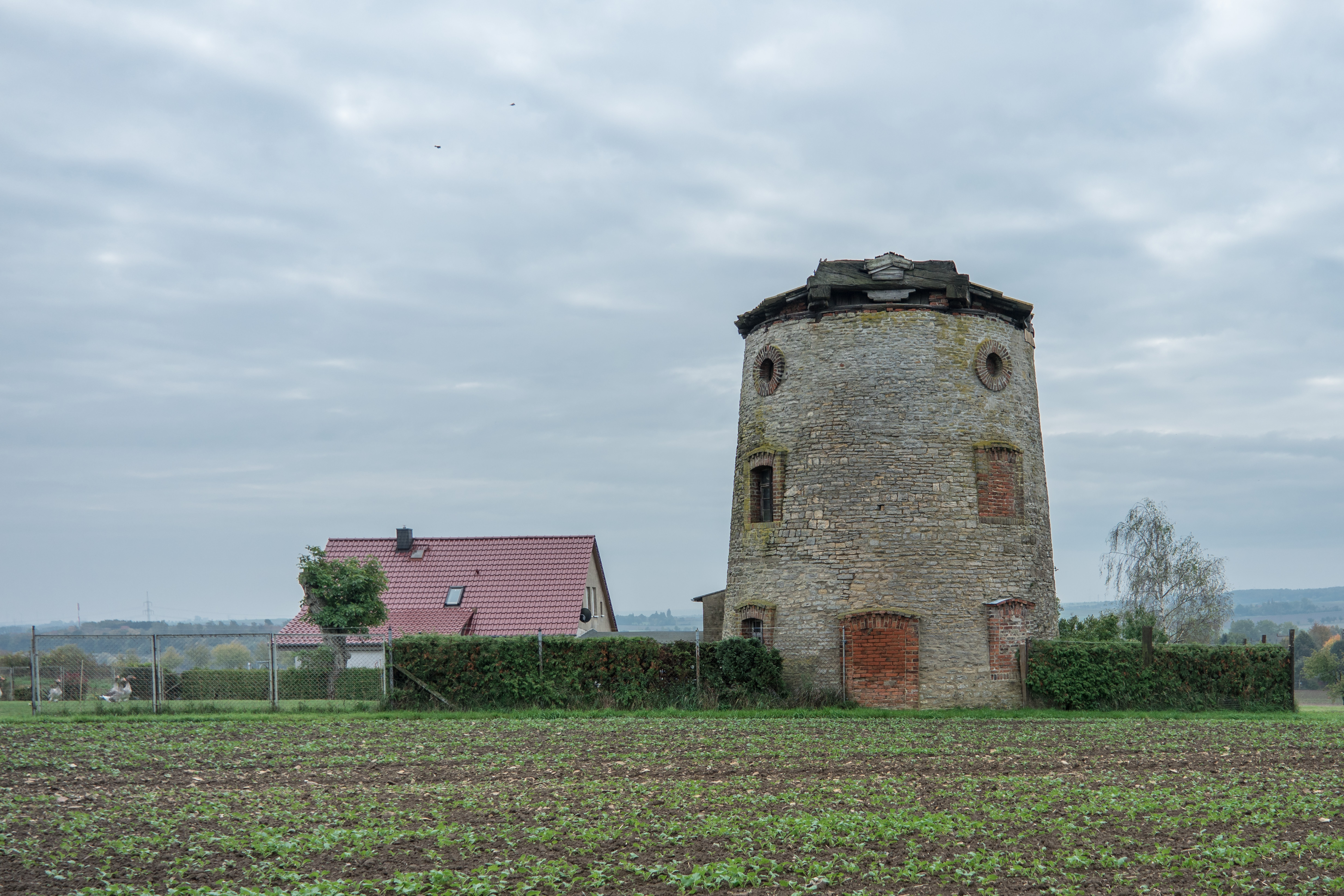
- Interactive map of Alleringersleben
- Location within Germany Location within Saxony-Anhalt
- Coordinates: 52°13′N 11°7′E
- Country: Germany
- State: Saxony-Anhalt
- District: Börde
- Municipality: Ingersleben

Area
  - Total: 5.70 km^{2} (2.20 sq mi)
- Elevation: 127 m (417 ft)

Population (2006-12-31)
  - Total: 449
  - Density: 78.8/km^{2} (204/sq mi)
- Time zone: UTC+01:00 (CET)
  - Summer (DST): UTC+02:00 (CEST)
- Postal codes: 39343
- Dialling codes: 039400
- Vehicle registration: BK

Alleringersleben is a village and a former municipality in the Börde district in Saxony-Anhalt, Germany.

Since 1 January 2010, it is part of the municipality Ingersleben.
