= Axien =

- Ortsteil of Annaburg
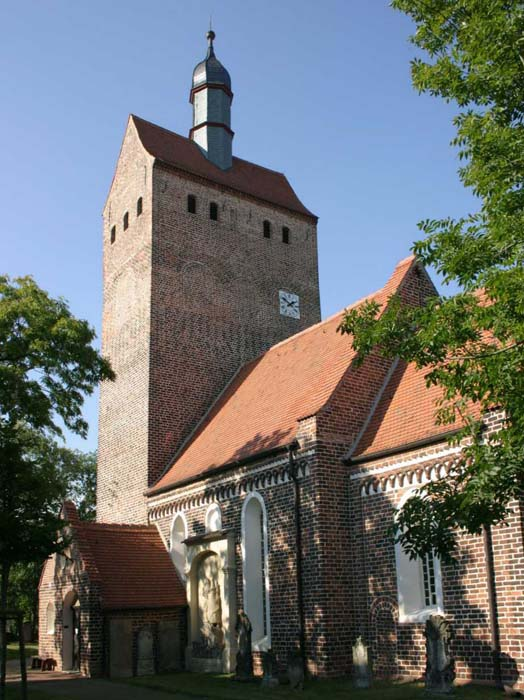
- Interactive map of Axien
- Location within Germany Location within Saxony-Anhalt
- Coordinates: 51°42′N 12°52′E
- Country: Germany
- State: Saxony-Anhalt
- District: Wittenberg
- Town: Annaburg

Area
  - Total: 22.57 km^{2} (8.71 sq mi)
- Elevation: 73 m (240 ft)

Population (2006-12-31)
  - Total: 565
  - Density: 25.0/km^{2} (64.8/sq mi)
- Time zone: UTC+01:00 (CET)
  - Summer (DST): UTC+02:00 (CEST)
- Postal codes: 06922
- Dialling codes: 035386
- Vehicle registration: WB

Axien is a village and a former municipality in the Wittenberg district in Saxony-Anhalt, Germany. Since 1 January 2011, Aixen is a suburb of the town Annaburg.

== Geography and transport ==
The community lies about 35 km southeast of Wittenberg and about 20 km north of Torgau in the lowlands on the east bank of the Elbe on an old, now dry, arm of that river. West of the community runs Federal Highway (Bundesstraße) B 182, and to the north is the B 187. It lies on the "Mid-Germany Church Road". In the south, the community borders on Saxony.

== History ==
The village of Axien is first documented in the 10th century. The village, however, must have been older, a castle by the name of Wazgrini in Axien having been mentioned in 865. It was used as a fortified bridgehead at a ford on the Elbe.

From 1815 to 1944, Axien was part of the Prussian Province of Saxony and from 1944 to 1945 of the Province of Halle-Merseburg.

After World War II, Axien was incorporated into the Province (since 1947, State) of Saxony-Anhalt from 1945 to 1952 and the Bezirk Cottbus of East Germany from 1952 to 1990. Since 1990, Axien has been part of Saxony-Anhalt, since 2011 as a part of Annaburg.

== Sights ==
- Bücherkirche church with brick construction from 1171 and ceiling paintings from the 12th century The church has a late romantic style and is a protected heritage building
- Atonement Cross in Kähnitzsch
- Grave on the local Ortsfriedhof cemetery of a serbian slave laborer who died in 1941
- Several pigeon towers and farm houses that are protected heritage buildings

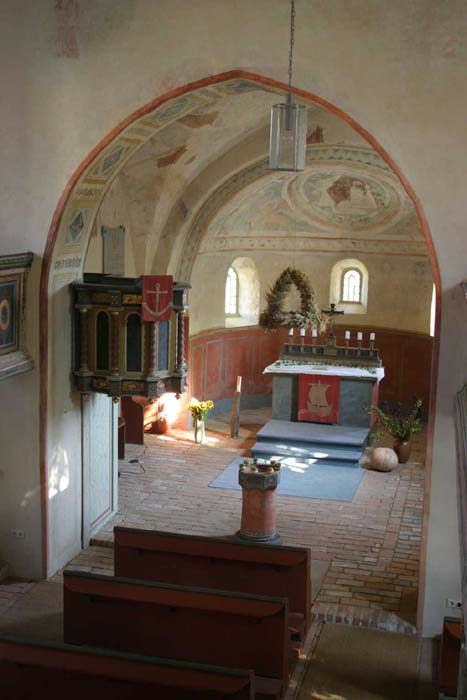
Nave of the Bücherkirche church in Aixen.
