= Christiane Tammer =

German mathematician

Christiane Tammer (née Gerstewitz, also published as Christiane Gerth) is a German mathematician known for her work on mathematical optimization. She is a professor in the Institute of Mathematics of Martin Luther University of Halle-Wittenberg, and editor-in-chief of Optimization: A Journal of Mathematical Programming and Operations Research.

Tammer is the namesake of the Gerstewitz functions or Gerstewitz functionals in vector optimization and its generalizations.

== Education ==
Tammer earned a doctorate (Dr. rer. nat.) in 1984 at the Technical University Leuna-Merseburg. Her dissertation, Beiträge zur Dualitätstheorie der nichtlinearen Vektoroptimierung, was supervised by Alfred Göpfert. She earned a habilitation at Halle in 1991.

== Books ==
Tammer is the author of books including:

- Variational Methods in Partially Ordered Spaces (with Alfred Göpfert, Hassan Riahi, and Constantin Zălinescu, Springer, 2003)
- Set-valued Optimization: An Introduction with Applications (with Akhtar A. Khan and Constantin Zălinescu, Springer, 2014)
- Scalarization and Separation by Translation Invariant Functions (with Petra Weidner, Springer, 2020)

She is the co-editor, with Frank Heyde, of Festschrift in celebration of Prof. Dr. Wilfried Grecksch's 60th birthday (Shaker, 2008).
