= Plossig =

- Ortsteil of Annaburg
- Interactive map of Plossig
- Location within Germany Location within Saxony-Anhalt
- Coordinates: 51°42′N 12°57′E
- Country: Germany
- State: Saxony-Anhalt
- District: Wittenberg
- Town: Annaburg

Area
  - Total: 11.12 km^{2} (4.29 sq mi)
- Elevation: 74 m (243 ft)

Population (2009-12-31)
  - Total: 251
  - Density: 22.6/km^{2} (58.5/sq mi)
- Time zone: UTC+01:00 (CET)
  - Summer (DST): UTC+02:00 (CEST)
- Postal codes: 06922
- Dialling codes: 035386
- Vehicle registration: WB

Plossig is a village and a former municipality in Wittenberg district in Saxony-Anhalt, Germany. Since 1 January 2011, it is part of the town Annaburg. The municipality belonged to the administrative community (Verwaltungsgemeinschaft) of Annaburg-Prettin.

== Geography ==
Plossig lies about 12 km south of Jessen on the edge of the Düben Heath Nature Park.

== History ==
From 1815 to 1944, Plossig was part of the Prussian Province of Saxony and from 1944 to 1945 of the Province of Halle-Merseburg.

After World War II, Plossig was incorporated into the Province (since 1947, State) of Saxony-Anhalt from 1945 to 1952 and the Bezirk Cottbus of East Germany from 1952 to 1990. Since 1990, Plossig has been part of Saxony-Anhalt, since 2011 as a part of Annaburg.

== Economy and transportation ==
Federal Highway (Bundesstraße) B 187 between Jessen and Wittenberg lies 12 km away.
