= Prettin =

- Ortsteil of Annaburg
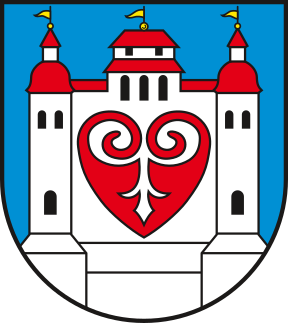
- Coat of arms
- Interactive map of Prettin
- Location within Germany Location within Saxony-Anhalt
- Coordinates: 51°40′N 12°55′E
- Country: Germany
- State: Saxony-Anhalt
- District: Wittenberg
- Town: Annaburg

Area
  - Total: 28.79 km^{2} (11.12 sq mi)
- Elevation: 77 m (253 ft)

Population (2009-12-31)
  - Total: 1,889
  - Density: 65.61/km^{2} (169.9/sq mi)
- Time zone: UTC+01:00 (CET)
  - Summer (DST): UTC+02:00 (CEST)
- Postal codes: 06922
- Dialling codes: 035386
- Vehicle registration: WB

Prettin is a town and a former municipality in Wittenberg district in Saxony-Anhalt.

== Geography and transportation ==
The town lies about 30 km southeast of Wittenberg and about 12 km north-northwest of Torgau in the lowland on the Elbe's east bank, west of the Annaburg Heath. This is, however, to a great extent a Bundeswehr troop drilling ground, and is therefore off limits. West of the community runs the Federal Highway (Bundesstraße) B 182, and to the north is the B 187. In the south, the community borders on Saxony. Prettin is linked with the Saxon community of Dommitzsch by a ferry on the Elbe.

== History ==
Lying at an old river crossing in the Elbe valley, the first settlers in the Prettin area were Slavs, and the area itself belonged to the Slavic domain of Nisizi. After the German Burgward ("castle district"), which first crops up in one of Otto I's documents as "Pretimi", had passed in 1012 from Archbishop Dagino to the Church estate of Magdeburg, and then by way of the County of Brehna in 1290 to the Dukes of Saxony-Wittenberg, Rudolf I of Saxony-Wittenberg built the so-called "Schlösschen" (little castle) about 1335. In this small hunting lodge, the Electress Elisabeth von Brandenburg, who had secretly given herself over to Evangelical teachings, found refuge between 1536 and 1545 after the staunchly Catholic Elector Joachim I of Brandenburg had threatened to have her walled up alive. Only after his death did she return to the capital. Some thirty years later, Elector August of Saxony had the Schlösschen torn down and the stones used to build Lichtenburg Castle, which centuries later would become infamous.

East of the townsite, about 1300, the Antonian Preceptorate of "Lichtenbergk" was founded, whose Preceptor General, Goswin von Orsoy became the first Chancellor of Wittenberg University. The Antonian monastery of Lichtenbergk was witness to an historic occasion when in 1518, Martin Luther and Georg Spalatin met in Elector Frederick the Wise's presence for consultations. After the discussion, the Elector decided on Luther's disposition in Wittenberg (the Elector always supported Luther). Two years after this came a dramatic discussion, in Philipp Melanchthon's presence, between Luther and the Papal envoy Karl von Miltitz. He tried in vain to get Luther to recant, and the break with Rome was inescapable. Miltitz drowned in the river Main on the way back to Rome. That Luther could have his discussions here shows how broadminded the Antonians were.

After much of the monastery was burnt down in a fire in 1533, it was dissolved and its property put in a lordly domain's charge. For Elector August I of Saxony, this was a welcome opportunity to satisfy his wife's request and build a Renaissance palace on the former monastery lands between 1574 and 1582. She did not get to enjoy it for very long, though, dying of the plague only three years later in 1585. After a period of decay, the palace blossomed once again under Electress Hedwig, who built the "Hedwigsburg", and who had been granted the palace as her "widow's seat" (Witwensitz) after her husband Christian II, Elector of Saxony died in 1611, whereupon she also found herself running the Ämter of Annaburg, Schweinitz (with Prettin and Lichtenburg), Seyda and Schlieben, even having a small army at her disposal. During the Thirty Years' War in 1637, the former Danish princess managed to convince the Swedish commander in the region to spare the small town the usual destruction being wrought throughout the countryside by Swedish troops. Three years after Hedwig's death, however, Prettin was sacked by the Swedes. Later, Elector's widow Wilhelmine Ernestine and her sister Anna Sophie of Denmark (August II the Strong's mother, who raised her offspring here) moved into the Lichtenburg, which ceased once and for all to be a widow's seat upon the former's death in 1717.

Back in the 16th century, there were not 800 inhabitants in Prettin. After a short time being part of the newly minted Kingdom of Saxony, this town on the Elbe had to be ceded to Prussia, thanks to Napoleon (1807). Even today, the Lichtenburg with its palace church from 1581 is an imposing Renaissance creation that was at first a widow's seat until 1811 when the empty ruins were turned into a prison, later, from 1933 to 1939 into a Nazi concentration camp, and later still, after the women were transferred to Ravensbrück concentration camp, into a Waffen-SS materiel office.

From 1815 to 1944, Prettin was part of the Prussian Province of Saxony and from 1944 to 1945 of the Province of Halle-Merseburg.

After World War II, Prettin was incorporated into the Province (since 1947, State) of Saxony-Anhalt from 1945 to 1952 and the Bezirk Cottbus of East Germany from 1952 to 1990. During East German times, the Schladitz detergent factory was located there. Since 1990, Prettin has been part of Saxony-Anhalt, since 2011 as a part of Annaburg.

== Personalities ==
- Otto Karl Bachmann (1877–1954), who in 1927 became the first KPD mayor of a German town (Oelsnitz in Saxony's Vogtlandkreis district).
- Gertraud Winkelvoss (1917–1981), member of the Landtag of Lower Saxony for the NPD

== See also ==
- Lichtenburg (concentration camp)
