= Börde Wanzleben =

Coordinates: 52°04′N 11°26′E

Börde Wanzleben was a Verwaltungsgemeinschaft ("collective municipality") in the district of Börde (district), in Saxony-Anhalt, Germany. The seat of the Verwaltungsgemeinschaft was in Wanzleben. It was created in 2004 and disbanded on 1 January 2010.

The Verwaltungsgemeinschaft Börde Wanzleben consisted of the following municipalities (population in 2006 between brackets):

1. Bottmersdorf (728)
2. Domersleben (1,143)
3. Dreileben (597)
4. Eggenstedt (282)
5. Groß Rodensleben (1,097)
6. Hohendodeleben (1,813)
7. Klein Rodensleben (577)
8. Klein Wanzleben (2,470)
9. Seehausen (1,892)
10. Wanzleben (5,294)
