= Weather Trends International =

- Type: Private
- Genre: Weather forecasting
- Founded: 2003; 23 years ago
- Founders: Bill Kirk and Jack Grum
- Headquarters: Bethlehem, Pennsylvania, U.S.
- Key people: Bill Kirk (CEO)
- Services: year-ahead weather forecasting for businesses
- Website: www.weathertrends360.com

Weather Trends International is an American company that provides year-ahead weather guidance for retailers, manufacturers, pharmaceutical companies, agricultural firms, and financial analysts worldwide. Its weather solutions are used to help businesses and farmers to manage weather risk.

To forecast the weather, Weather Trends uses a statistical methodology that was first developed in the early 1990s. An independent study from 2014 verified that its forecasts project temperature, precipitation and snowfall trends up to a year ahead worldwide with more than 80% accuracy.

== History ==
Weather Trends was founded in 2003 by Bill Kirk (who serves as the chief executive officer) and Jack Grum (who serves as the chief revenue officer). Kirk was previously the vice president of client services at Planalytics. Weather Trends has received funding from Trestle Ventures, Kodiak Venture Partners and Innovation Ventures and has raised more than 6.8 million dollars. The company is based in Bethlehem, Pennsylvania with offices in Bentonville, Arkansas and Sacramento, California.

Weather Trends' clients include Kohl's, Target Corporation, Walgreens, AutoZone, Anheuser-Busch, Coca-Cola, Microsoft, Citi, Morgan Stanley, JP Morgan, Limagrain and AgReliant Genetics.

== Products and services ==
Weather Trends International offers two services for the retail industry, one for small businesses and one for large retailers. Both products offer long-range forecasts a year out. The company's Equity Report is for financial planners, hedge fund managers and others following weather information to gauge success in the stock market. The firm services the agricultural market with its FarmCast reports which aid in crop planning and help determine yield expectations.
