= Seehausen =

Seehausen may refer to:

- Seehausen, Altmark, a town and a Verwaltungsgemeinschaft in Saxony-Anhalt, Germany
- Seehausen (Verbandsgemeinde), a collective municipality in Stendal, Saxony-Anhalt, Germany
- Seehausen, Börde, part of the Verwaltungsgemeinschaft Börde Wanzleben, Saxony-Anhalt, Germany
- Seehausen am Staffelsee, a municipality in Bavaria, Germany
- Seehausen, Leipzig, a former village and now a part of the city of Leipzig
- Seehausen bei Prenzlau, a town in the Uckermark district, in Brandenburg, Germany
- Seehausen (Oberuckersee), a former fisher-village, now quarter of the Oberuckersee community in Uckermark, Germany
