= Franz Karl Achard =

German chemist (1753–1821)

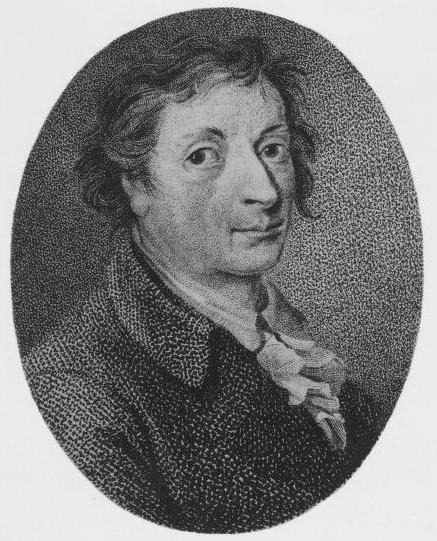
- Born: 28 April 1753; Berlin, Margraviate of Brandenburg, Holy Roman Empire
- Died: 20 April 1821 (aged 67); Wohlau, Province of Silesia, Kingdom of Prussia, German Confederation
- Known for: Sugar
- Scientific career
- Fields: Physics, chemistry, biology, geoscience
- Academic advisors: Andreas Sigismund Marggraf

Franz Karl Achard (28 April 1753 – 20 April 1821) was a German (Prussian) chemist, geoscientist, physicist, and biologist. His principal discovery was the production of sugar from sugar beets.

== Life and work ==
Achard was born in Berlin, the son of preacher Max Guillaume Achard, a descendant of Huguenot refugees, and his wife Marguerite Elisabeth (Rouppert). He studied physics and chemistry in Berlin. Achard became interested in sugar refining through his stepfather. At the age of 20, Achard entered the "Circle of Friends of Natural Sciences" and met Andreas Sigismund Marggraf, then director of the physical classes at the Royal Academy of Sciences. Achard studied many subjects, including meteorology, evaporation chillness, electricity, telegraphy, gravity, lightning arresters, and published in German and French.

Achard was a favourite of King Frederick II of Prussia, and directly reported to the King on his research twice a week. About a study on the influence of electricity on mental capabilities, Frederick II was reported to have said: If he is able to provide reason for the half-wits in my Prussian states using electricity, then he is worth more than his own weight in gold.

In 1776 Achard was elected to the Royal Academy of Sciences at Berlin. In 1778, Achard was elected as member of the German Academy of Sciences Leopoldina. Following the death of Marggraf in 1782, Archard went on to become the director of the physical classes of the academy. In 1782 he was elected a foreign member of the Royal Swedish Academy of Sciences.

For his discoveries in the acclimatisation of tobacco to Germany, the king granted him a lifetime pension of 500 taler. Achard was also esteemed by Frederick William II of Prussia.

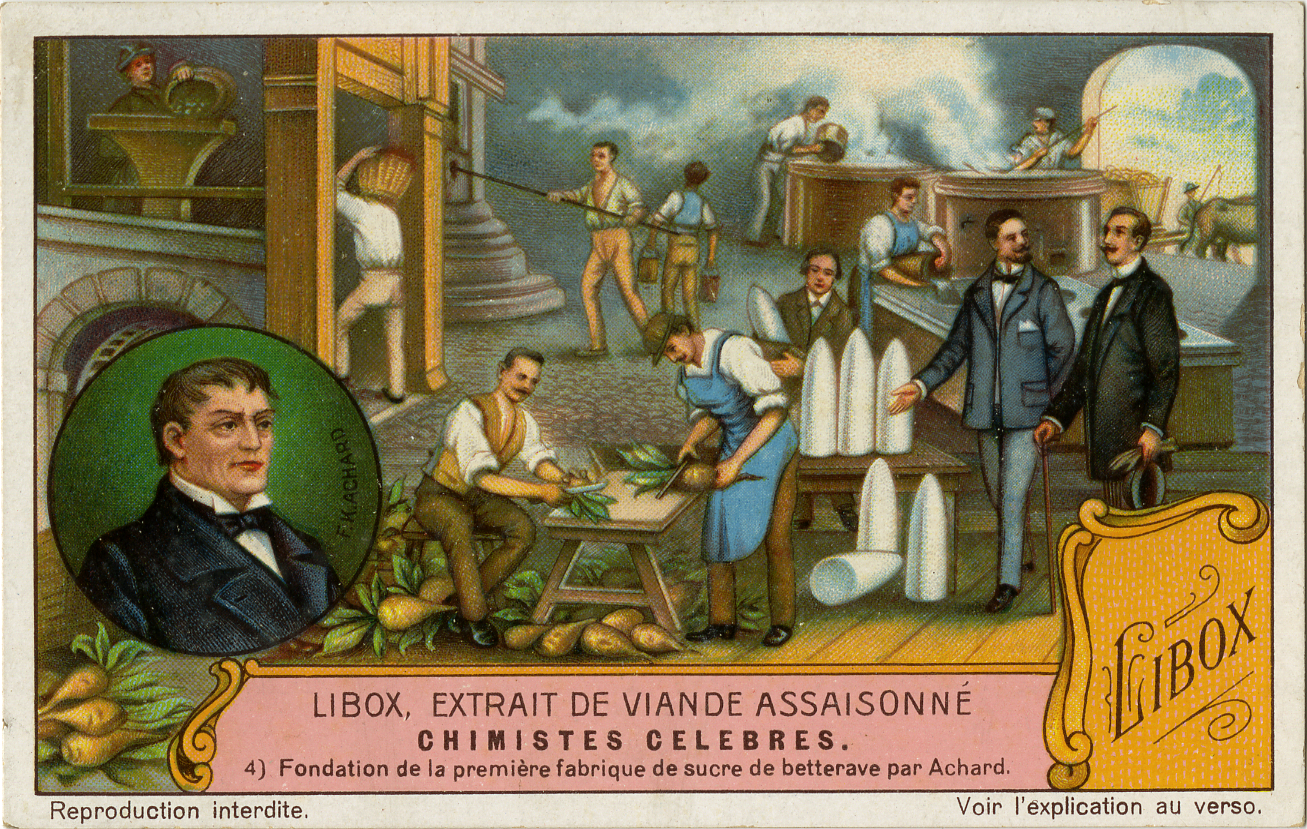
Achard, Chimistes Celebres, Liebig's Extract of Meat Company Trading Card, 1929

=== Sugar ===
Achard revived the discovery by Marggraf in 1747 that sugar beets contained sugar, and devised a process to produce sugar from sugar beets. Beginning in 1789, he planted various sugar-bearing plants on his manor in Kaulsdorf near Berlin. He soon preferred sugar beets because of their efficiency. In the following year he studied different varieties of beets and the influence of fertilisers. The research was interrupted when Kaulsdorf manor burnt down and had to be sold. Achard later continued on the manor Französisch Buchholz. This would in turn lead to a reduced need for slaves in sugar-production, and the subsequent abolishment of slavery in much of the world.

In 1801, with the support of King Friedrich Wilhelm III, he opened the first sugar beet refinery at Gut Kunern near Steinau Silesia, Prussia. In 1802, the refinery processed 400 tons of beets with a degree of efficiency of 4%. Other refineries were soon built by his students Johann Gottlob Nathusius and Moritz, Freiherr von Koppy. In 1807 Achard's plant was burned down during the Napoleonic Wars and in 1810 it was rebuilt on a small scale. Embargoes by Napoleon kept cane sugar imports away from Germany and thus the growing and refining of sugar beets became highly important for the Prussian government. Refineries also appeared in Bohemia, Augsburg and in 1811 in France. France itself built many refineries and was only in later years surpassed by Prussia.

English sugar merchants offered Achard 200,000 taler to declare his experiments a failure but he refused. With Achard's discovery, sugar was no longer a luxury product, but local production became a necessity, due to the embargoes. Achard taught classes to have a large number of sugar beet growers and the specially developed sugar beets became available for everyone. Achard described the sugar beet as, "one of the most bountiful gifts which the devine munificence had awarded to man on earth."

In 1794, Achard built an optical telegraph between Spandau and Bellevue. This device had been invented just one year before by Claude Chappe.

Due to Archard's financial difficulties as a result of several fires in 1807, his refineries were declared bankrupt in 1815. He died, destitute, in 1821 in Wohlau. His life's work was carried on mainly by French industrialists such as at the refineries of Matthias Christian Rabbethge. In mid 19th century America, Achard's grandson Anton William Waldemar Achard successfully promoted beet sugar production in Michigan according to a later descendant, Emil Lockwood, son of Mabel Pauline Achard.

== Publications ==
- Lectures on Experimental Philosophy 4 vol., 1792
- Abhandlung über die Bereitung des Zuckers aus der in vielen Provinzen allerhöchst - Dero Staaten, als Viehfutter häufig angebauten Runkelrübe, nebst den dazu gehörigen Belägen und Proben des Runkelrübenzuckers [Treatise on the preparation of sugar from the sugar beet, which is often cultivated as fodder in many provinces of your highness's states, together with the related documentation and samples of beet sugar], Berlin, 1799
- Anleitung zur Bereitung des Rohzuckers aus Rüben [Guide to the preparation of raw sugar from beets], Berlin, 1800
- Kurze Geschichte der Beweise der Ausführbarkeit im Großen der Zuckerfabrication aus Runkelrüben [Brief history of the proof of the feasibility of the large scale production of sugar from sugar beets], Berlin, 1800
- Anleitung zum Anbau der Runkelrüben [Guide to the cultivation of sugar beets], Breslau, 1803
- Über den Einfluß der Runkelrübenzuckerfabrication auf die Ökonomie [On the influence on the economy of the production of sugar from sugar beets], Glogau, 1805
- Die europäische Zuckerfabrication aus Runkelrüben [European sugar production from sugar beets], Leipzig, 1812
