= List of cities in Saxony-Anhalt by population =

The following list sorts all cities and municipalities in the German state of Saxony-Anhalt with a population of more than 10,000. As of December 31, 2021, 53 cities fulfill this criterion and are listed here. This list refers only to the population of individual municipalities within their defined limits, which does not include other municipalities or suburban areas within urban agglomerations.

== List ==
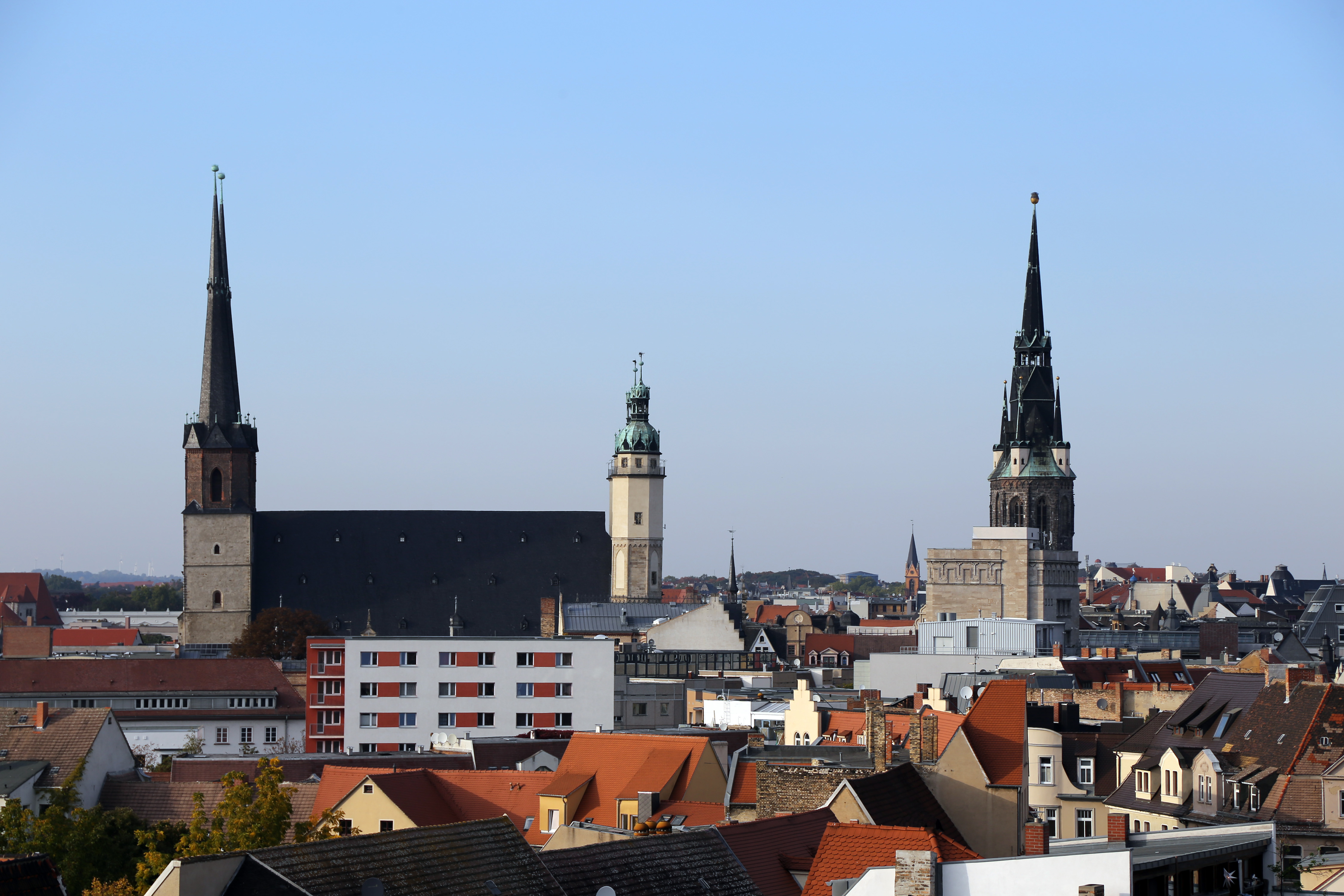
Halle (Saale)

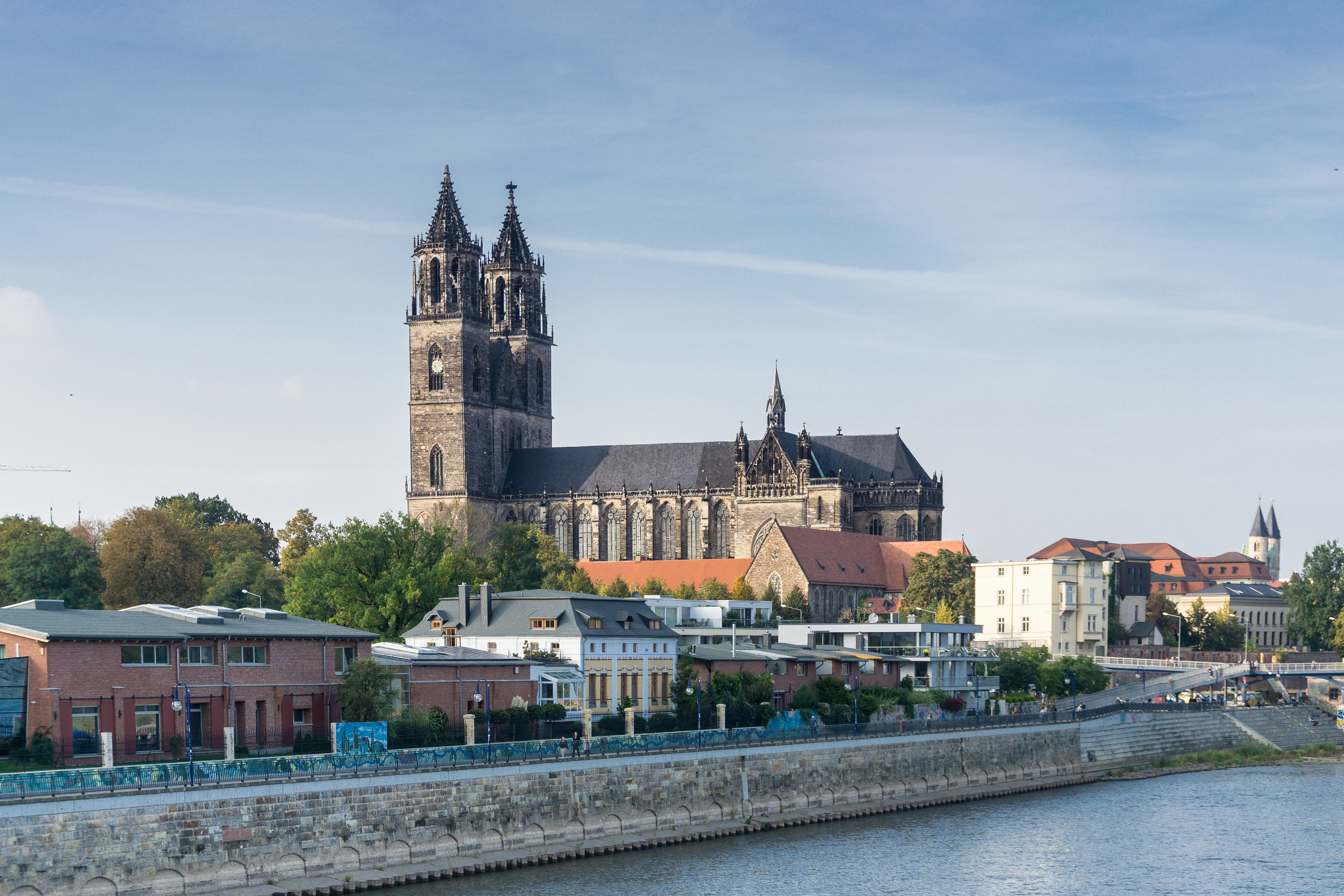
Magdeburg

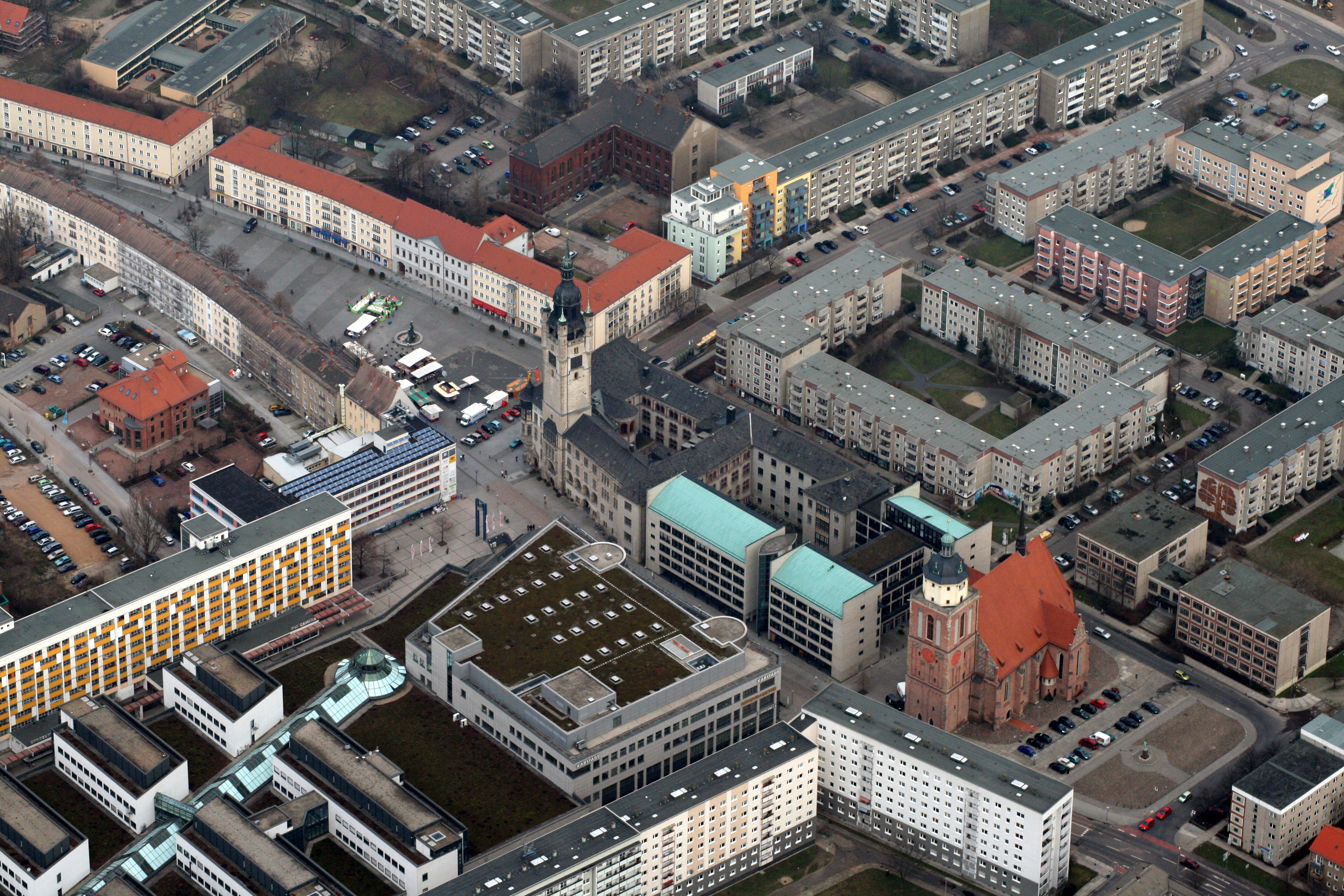
Dessau-Roßlau

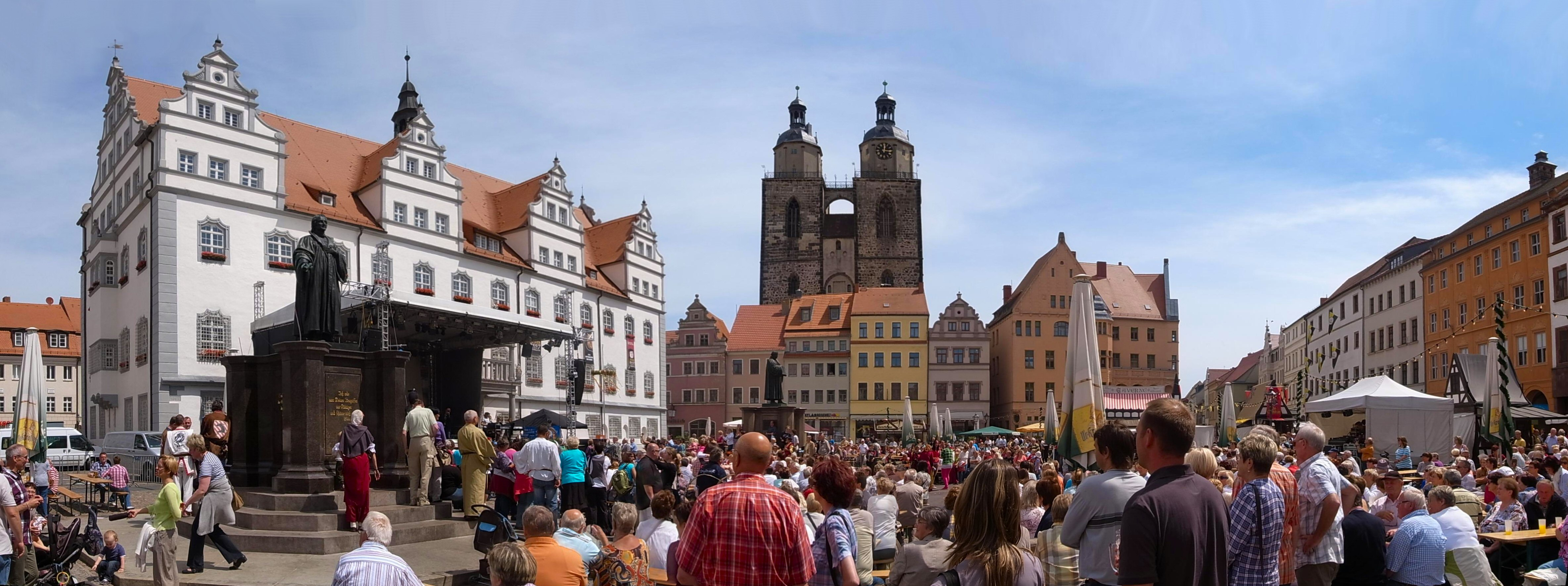
Wittenberg

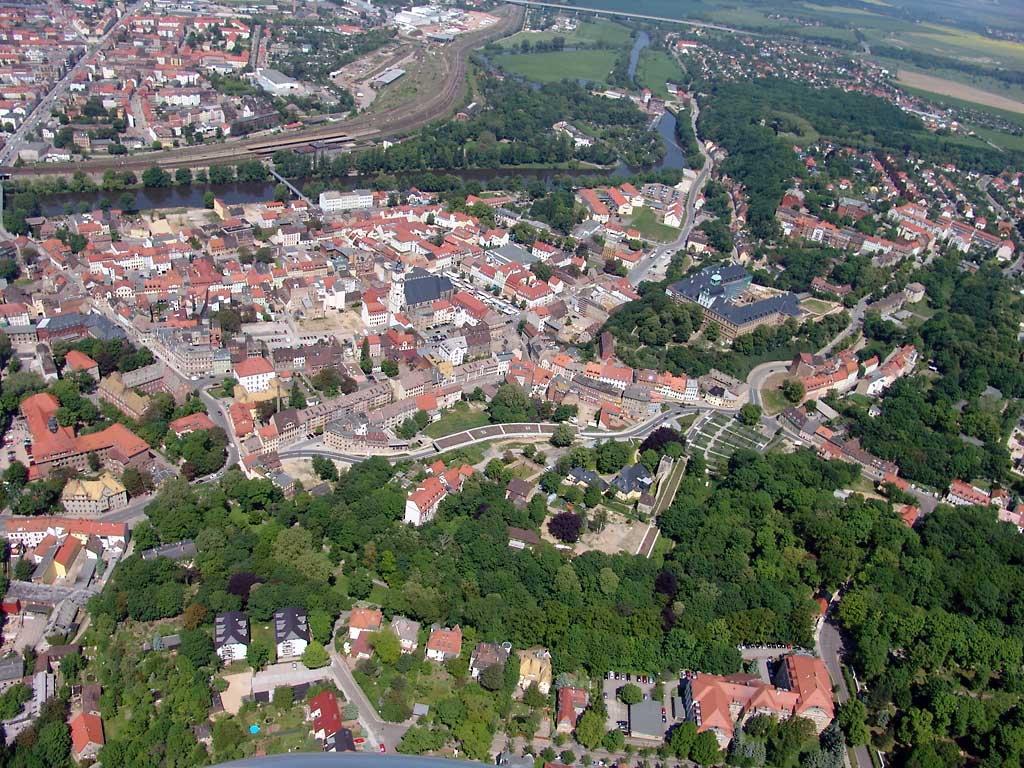
Weißenfels

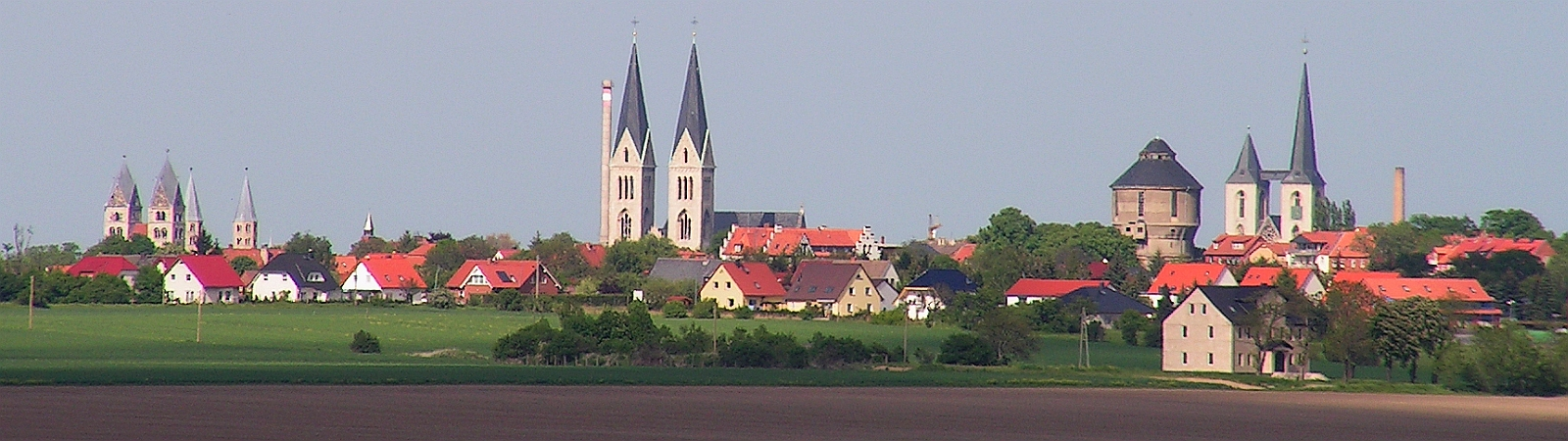
Halberstadt

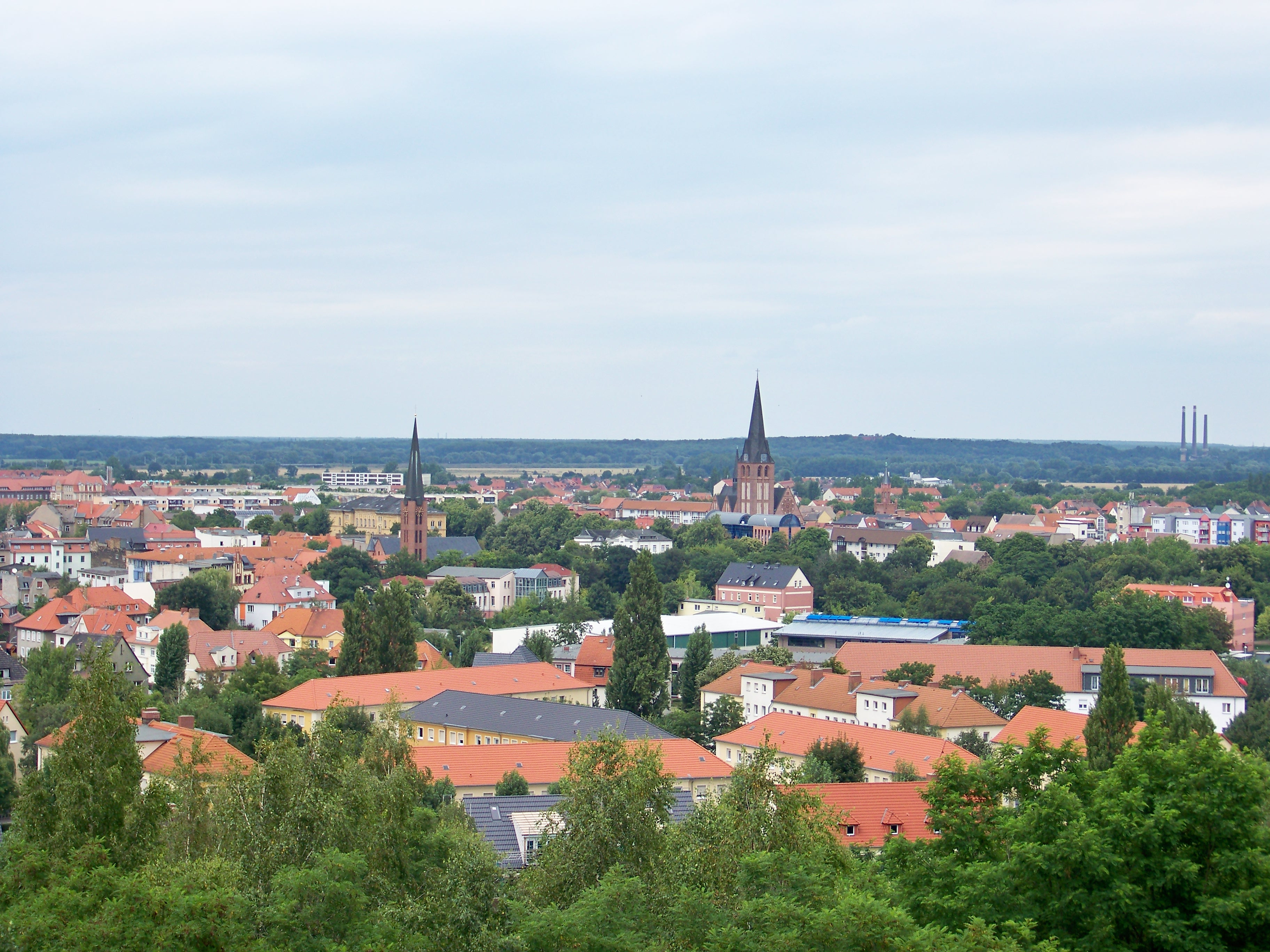
Bitterfeld-Wolfen

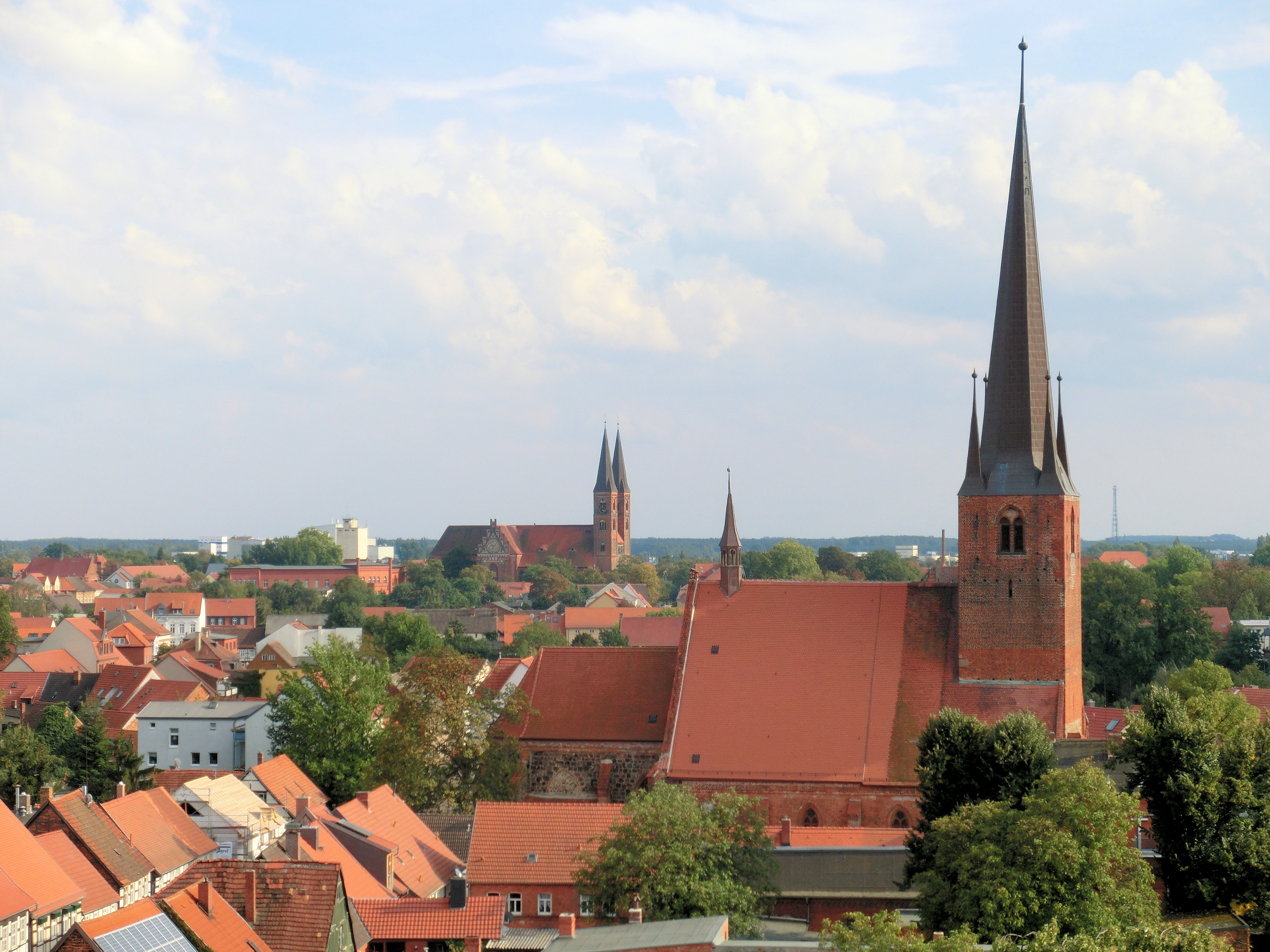
Stendal

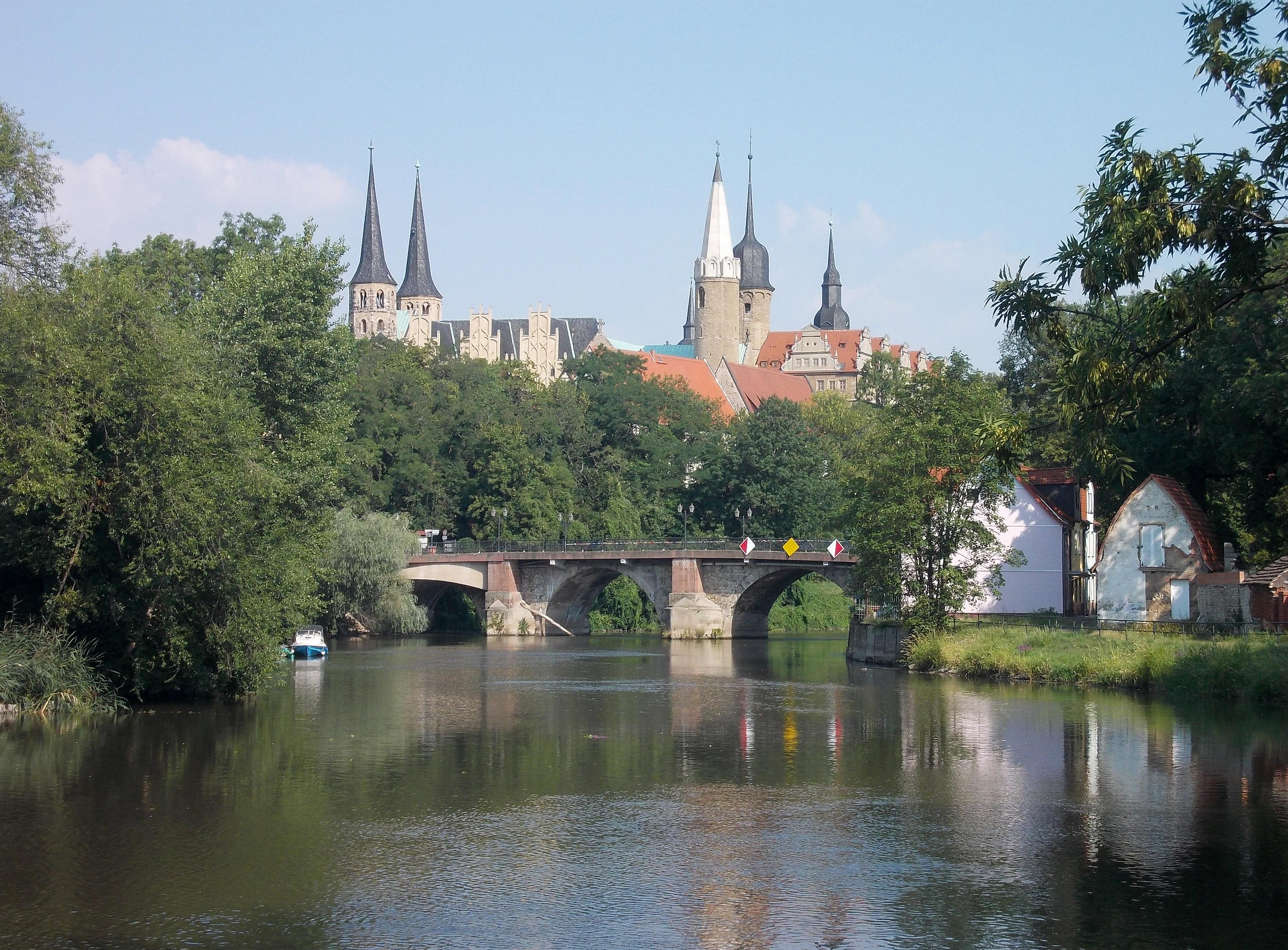
Merseburg

The following table lists the 53 cities and municipalities in Saxony-Anhalt with a population of at least 10,000 on December 31, 2021, as estimated by the State Statistical Office of Saxony-Anhalt. A city is displayed in bold if it is a state or federal capital.

| Rank | City | District | Population (2021 est.) | Land area (km^{2}) | Pop. density (/km^{2}) |
|---|---|---|---|---|---|
| 1 | Halle (Saale) | urban district | 238,061 | 135.01 | 1763 |
| 2 | **Magdeburg** | urban district | 236,188 | 201.03 | 1175 |
| 3 | Dessau-Roßlau | urban district | 78,731 | 245.00 | 321 |
| 4 | Wittenberg | Wittenberg | 44,984 | 240.63 | 187 |
| 5 | Weißenfels | Burgenlandkreis | 39,745 | 113.57 | 350 |
| 6 | Halberstadt | Harz | 38,682 | 142.97 | 271 |
| 7 | Stendal | Stendal | 38,359 | 268.26 | 143 |
| 8 | Bitterfeld-Wolfen | Anhalt-Bitterfeld | 37,047 | 86.99 | 426 |
| 9 | Merseburg | Saalekreis | 33,641 | 53.75 | 626 |
| 10 | Wernigerode | Harz | 32,027 | 170.20 | 188 |
| 11 | Bernburg | Salzlandkreis | 32,000 | 113.53 | 282 |
| 12 | Naumburg | Burgenlandkreis | 31,815 | 129.90 | 245 |
| 13 | Schönebeck | Salzlandkreis | 30,067 | 86.08 | 349 |
| 14 | Zeitz | Burgenlandkreis | 27,003 | 87.18 | 310 |
| 15 | Aschersleben | Salzlandkreis | 26,328 | 156.36 | 168 |
| 16 | Sangerhausen | Mansfeld-Südharz | 25,419 | 207.71 | 122 |
| 17 | Köthen | Anhalt-Bitterfeld | 24,876 | 77.46 | 321 |
| 18 | Staßfurt | Salzlandkreis | 24,265 | 146.67 | 165 |
| 19 | Quedlinburg | Harz | 23,341 | 120.52 | 194 |
| 20 | Salzwedel | Altmarkkreis Salzwedel | 22,999 | 304.57 | 76 |
| 21 | Eisleben | Mansfeld-Südharz | 22,404 | 143.94 | 156 |
| 22 | Burg | Jerichower Land | 22,254 | 164.15 | 136 |
| 23 | Gardelegen | Altmarkkreis Salzwedel | 21,980 | 633.23 | 35 |
| 24 | Zerbst | Anhalt-Bitterfeld | 21,234 | 468.94 | 45 |
| 25 | Blankenburg | Harz | 19,248 | 148.98 | 129 |
| 26 | Oschersleben | Börde | 19,193 | 188.92 | 102 |
| 27 | Haldensleben | Börde | 19,028 | 156.21 | 122 |
| 28 | Hohe Börde | Börde | 18,703 | 171.75 | 109 |
| 29 | Thale | Harz | 16,994 | 137.67 | 123 |
| 30 | Landsberg | Saalekreis | 14,960 | 125.44 | 119 |
| 31 | Sandersdorf-Brehna | Anhalt-Bitterfeld | 14,302 | 81.89 | 175 |
| 32 | Jessen | Wittenberg | 14,150 | 352.25 | 40 |
| 33 | Leuna | Saalekreis | 13,899 | 87.85 | 158 |
| 34 | Wanzleben-Börde | Börde | 13,821 | 188.15 | 73 |
| 35 | Hettstedt | Mansfeld-Südharz | 13,623 | 36.93 | 369 |
| 36 | Oebisfelde-Weferlingen | Börde | 13,544 | 249.36 | 54 |
| 37 | Genthin | Jerichower Land | 13,402 | 230.76 | 58 |
| 38 | Südliches Anhalt | Anhalt-Bitterfeld | 13,146 | 192.63 | 68 |
| 39 | Teutschenthal | Saalekreis | 12,793 | 90.67 | 141 |
| 40 | Möckern | Jerichower Land | 12,778 | 524.35 | 24 |
| 41 | Muldestausee | Anhalt-Bitterfeld | 11,557 | 137.62 | 84 |
| 42 | Coswig | Wittenberg | 11,494 | 295.61 | 39 |
| 43 | Gräfenhainichen | Wittenberg | 11,413 | 159.54 | 72 |
| 44 | Bad Dürrenberg | Saalekreis | 11,389 | 36.15 | 315 |
| 45 | Wolmirstedt | Börde | 11,371 | 54.27 | 210 |
| 46 | Salzatal | Saalekreis | 11,325 | 109.39 | 104 |
| 47 | Osterwieck | Harz | 11,012 | 212.91 | 52 |
| 48 | Schkopau | Saalekreis | 10,937 | 99.73 | 110 |
| 49 | Tangerhütte | Stendal | 10,544 | 294.99 | 36 |
| 50 | Gommern | Jerichower Land | 10,452 | 160.11 | 65 |
| 51 | Braunsbedra | Saalekreis | 10,432 | 74.31 | 140 |
| 52 | Tangermünde | Stendal | 10,350 | 89.98 | 115 |
| 53 | Querfurt | Saalekreis | 10,321 | 155.62 | 66 |
