= Shoshan Haran =

Israeli agronomist (born 1956)

- שושן הרן
- Born: Shoshan Havron; 1956 (age 69–70); Be'eri, Israel
- Citizenship: Israeli, German
- Education: Hebrew University of Jerusalem, Faculty of Agriculture (BSc and PhD); Rutgers (Post-doc)
- Occupation: President of Fair Planet
- Organization: Fair Planet
- Known for: Founding Fair Planet NPO; taken hostage by Hamas
- Spouse: Avshalom Haran
- Father: Abraham Havron

Shoshan Haran (Hebrew: שושן הרן) is an Israeli agronomist and the founder and president of the Fair Planet nonprofit organization. Haran was kidnapped from her house during the Be'eri massacre and was released 50 days later in the first hostage deal.

== Biography ==
Born and raised in Kibbutz Be'eri, she studied for a BA in plant protection at the Faculty of Agriculture of the Hebrew University. After working in the field in the kibbutz itself she returned to the faculty and worked on a direct path to a Ph.D. under the supervision of Ilan Chet. She then continued to postdoctoral degree at Rutgers University NJ with the help of a Fulbright scholarship and a BARD scholarship.

After returning to Israel, she worked for 11 years at Hazera Seeds, a subsidiary of the Limagrain Group, which specializes in the cultivation of vegetable varieties. Her work in the seeds industry, along with her travels around the world have motivated her to found the Fair Planet nonprofit organization, which aims to improve the harvest and livelihood of smallholder African farmers by providing them access to professional high quality seed varieties. Fair Planet began its activities in Ethiopia, where, as of 2019, it operates four training centers. Subsequently, the organization expanded its work to Tanzania and Rwanda. According to a study conducted at the Hebrew University on the effectiveness of Fair Planet, around 75,000 farmers increased their income, and approximately half a million people improved their socio-economic status as a result of its work. The study also estimated that 95 percent of participating families experienced improved food security. In addition, 83 percent of participants used their additional income to send their children to school, while 92 percent reported better health, either due to greater access to modern medical services or as a result of improved nutrition.

Haran is a member of the Women Wage Peace movement, and on 4 October 2023, three days before the surprise attack on Israel, she participated in an event organized by the movement at the Dead Sea.

== Abduction and captivity ==
On the morning of October 7, 2023, Hamas militants abducted Haran from her home in Be’eri together with her daughter and two of her grandchildren, while her son-in-law and husband attempted unsuccessfully to repel the attackers, and the family home was burned down. During her captivity she was held in apartments belonging to senior Hamas commanders, separate from the families of the militants themselves. After fifty days in captivity, she was released together with her daughter and grandchildren as part of the first ceasefire agreement and prisoner exchange of November 2023. Along with them, Haran’s sister-in-law and niece, who had been visiting the kibbutz during the Simchat Torah holiday, were also released.

During her captivity, Haran believed that her husband Avshalom and her son-in-law Tal Shoham were also being held by Hamas. Upon her return to Israel, she was informed by her children that her husband, Avshalom, had been murdered. Haran also learned that her sister Lilach Kipnis, her brother-in-law Eviatar Kipnis and his caregiver, Paul Castelvi had also been murdered in the Be'eri massacre. Tal Shoham was released from captivity after 505 days.

== Post-release activities ==
Following her release, Haran became active in the campaign for the return of hostages. A few days after her return to Israel, she met with President Isaac Herzog and urged him to make every effort to secure the release of all hostages.

Later, Haran joined the advisory council of Hostage Aid Worldwide, a non-profit NGO dedicated to the release of hostages globally and prevention of acts of hostage taking. In May 2024, she addressed the UN Security Council during a special session on the situation of Israeli hostages, shared her personal story, and called on the nations of the world to take action to secure the release of all hostages.

In January 2025, following the initiation of the second ceasefire, Haran took the stage prior to a speech delivered by Donald Trump in Washington, D.C., after his inauguration as President of the United States, calling to complete all stages of the ceasefire. In June 2025, Haran was awarded an honorary doctorate by the Open University of Israel.

In January 2026, it was announced that Haran was to release a memoire about what she and her family members experienced after they were abducted on October 7, 2023.

== See also ==
- List of Gaza war hostages
