= Nordzucker =

Major German sugar manufacturer

Nordzucker AG
- Type: Aktiengesellschaft
- Industry: Food processing
- Predecessor: Aktien-Zuckerfabrik Fallersleben; Lehrter Zucker
- Founded: 1997 (Braunschweig, Lower Saxony)
- Headquarters: Braunschweig, Lower Saxony
- Key people: Dr Lars Gorissen (CEO), Jochen Johannes Juister (Chairman of the Supervisory Board)
- Products: sugar, liquid sugars, sugar specialities, animal feed, bioethanol, carbolime
- Revenue: € 1,670 million (2020/2021)
- Net income: € 66 million (2020/2021)
- Number of employees: 3,792 (2020/2021)
- Website: www.nordzucker.com

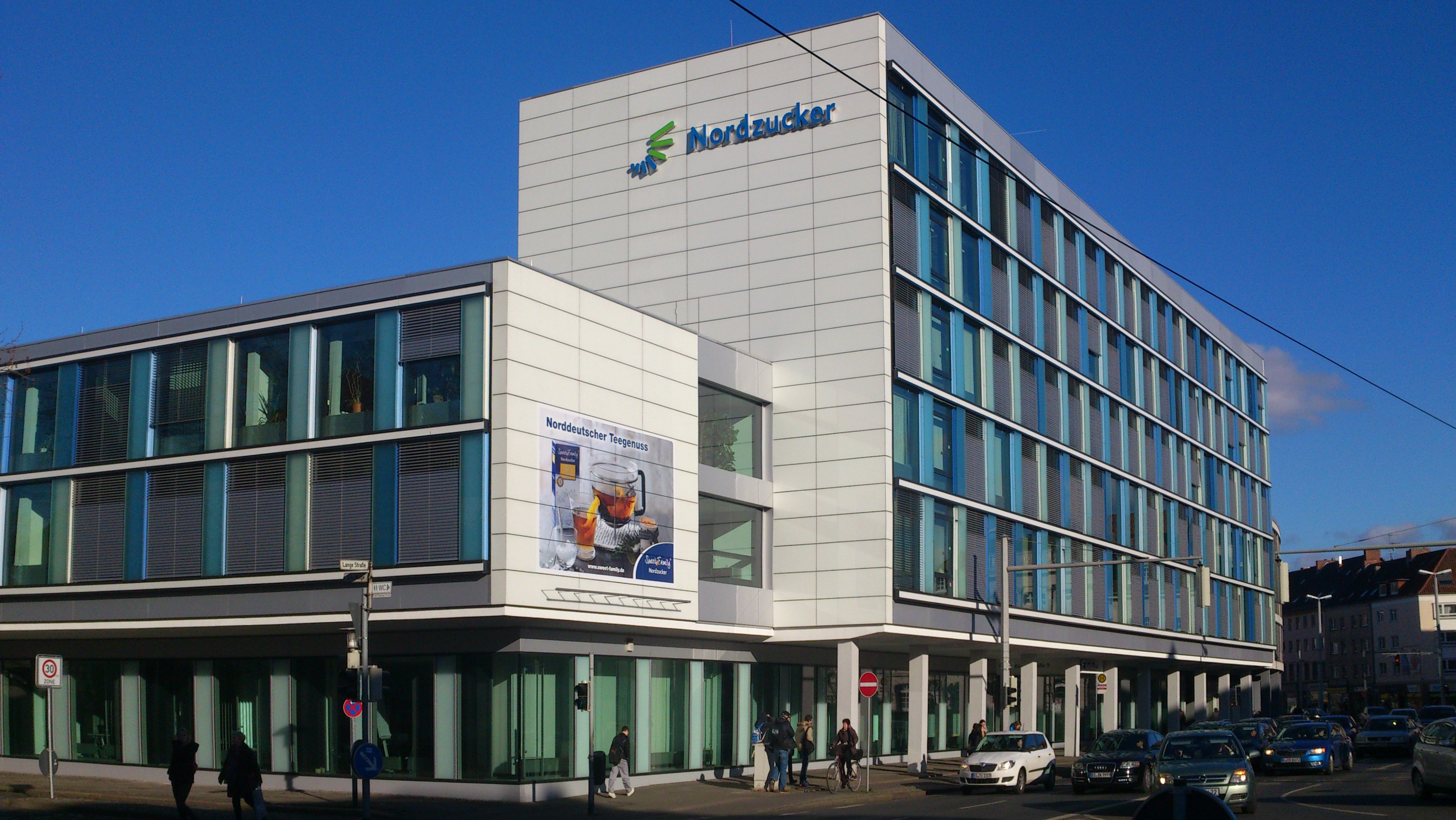
Nordzucker AG headquarters in Braunschweig, Lower Saxony

Nordzucker AG, headquartered in Braunschweig, Lower Saxony, is Europe's second largest sugar manufacturer. The production of sugar, liquid sugars and other specialities for the application in the nutrition, beverage and sweets industry as well as other sugar specialities like refined sugar, icing sugar, lump sugar, preserving sugar, tea sugars, organic sugar and flavoured sugars for consumers are the core business of the company. In addition to that, Nordzucker produces animal feed and bioethanol from sugar beet. In the 2020/2021 financial year, the company produced 2.7 million tons of sugar from sugar beet and 0.7 million tons of sugar from sugar cane. Sales added up to EUR 1.67 billion and net income came to EUR 66 million.

== History ==
The roots of the company date back to the year 1838, when the Klein Wanzleben plant, the first plant of the company that is still in service today, was founded.

The Nordzucker AG was formed by the merger of the Braunschweig-based Zuckerverbund Nord AG (ZVN) and the Uelzen-based Zucker-Aktiengesellschaft Uelzen-Braunschweig (ZAG) in 1997.

Between 1999 and 2003, Nordzucker expanded to Eastern Europe and acquired its Polish plants Chełmża and Opalenica and its Slovak plant Trenčianska Teplá.

In 2003, the Nordstemmen-based Union-Zucker Südhannover GmbH was integrated into the Group.

In March 2009, Nordzucker acquired the Copenhagen-based sugar manufacturer Nordic Sugar A/S (formerly known as Danisco Sugar) for EUR 730 million. Nordic Sugar runs sugar plants in Denmark, Sweden, Finland and Lithuania.

In February 2014, the Federal Cartel Office imposed a joint fine of 280 million euros on the company together with its competitors Südzucker and Pfeifer & Langen for anti-competitive agreements. Numerous customers filed suits for damages.

In February 2019, Nordzucker announced the acquisition of 70 percent of the shares in Mackay Sugar Limited (MSL), based in Mackay, Australia's second largest sugar producer. MSL also has a 25 percent interest in Sugar Australia and New Zealand Sugar, a sugar refining joint venture in Australia and New Zealand with Wilmar International.

== Company profile and business segments ==
=== Locations ===
The Nordzucker plants are primarily located in Germany and Eastern and Northern Europe as well as Australia.

==== Sugar plants ====
- Clauen (Germany)
- Klein Wanzleben (Germany)
- Nordstemmen (Germany)
- Schladen (Germany)
- Uelzen (Germany)
- Opalenica (Poland)
- Chełmża (Poland)
- Trenčianska Teplá (Slovakia)
- Nakskov (Denmark)
- Nykøbing Falster (Denmark)
- Örtofta (Sweden)
- Kėdainiai (Lithuania)
- Säkylä (Finland)
- Marian (Australia)
- Farleigh (Australia)
- Racecourse (Australia)

==== Liquid sugar plants ====
- Groß Munzel (Germany)
- Nordstemmen (Germany)
- Arlöv (Sweden)
- Kantvik (Finland)

==== Refineries ====
- Chełmża (Poland)
- Kantvik (Finland)

==== Other locations ====
- Headquarters in Braunschweig (Germany)
- Nordic Sugar head office in Copenhagen (Denmark)
- Bioethanol plant Klein Wanzleben (Germany)
- UAB Nordzucker Business Services in Kaunas (Lithuania)

In addition to that, the company runs sales and distribution locations in Riga (Latvia), Vilnius (Lithuania), Tallinn (Estonia), Reykjavík (Iceland), Oslo (Norway), Dublin (Ireland) and Athens (Greece) as well as an office in Brussels (Belgium).

=== Brands ===
For households, Nordzucker mainly distributes its products under its “SweetFamily” and “Dansukker” brands via food retailers. SweetFamily is distributed in Germany, Poland and Slovakia, whereas Dansukker is distributed in Scandinavia and the Baltic states.

=== Other business segments and investments ===
- Besides sugar, Nordzucker produces other products from sugar beet such as animal feed and molasses. In addition to that, the company markets carbolime as a fertilizer, which is a byproduct of sugar production.
- At the Klein Wanzleben location, Nordzucker annually produces app. 130,000m³ of bioethanol from sugar beet and sells it to the fuel industry.
- Together with the Malaysian company PureCircle, Nordzucker runs the joint venture NP Sweet. The company is located in Copenhagen and develops and markets products on the basis of the natural sweetener stevia.
- Nordzucker has a 35.4% stake in the Czech sugar production company Tereos TTD a.s. The company is located in Dobrovice and runs two sugar plants.

=== Management ===
The Executive Board consists of the following members:

- Dr Lars Gorissen (Chief Executive Officer (CEO)), since 2018, Chief Agricultural Officer from 2014-2018
- Axel Aumüller (Chief Operating Officer (COO)), since 2009
- Alexander Bott (Chief Financial Officer (CFO)), since 2018

The Supervisory Board consists of 15 members, including 10 shareholders’ representatives and 5 representatives of the workforce. Jochen Johannes Juister is the chairman of the board.

=== Shareholding structure ===
The major investors of Nordzucker AG are the two holding companies Nordzucker Holding AG (83.8%) and Union-Zucker Südhannover GmbH (11.1%). Another 5.1% of shares are free-float. In contrast to its competitor Südzucker AG, Nordzucker AG is not listed at a stock exchange.
