= Hazera Seeds =

Vegetable Seed Company

- Industry: Agriculture
- Founded: 1939
- Founder: Tzadok Rosenthal
- Headquarters: Israel; The Netherlands
- Key people: Ofer Peleg (CEO)
- Revenue: ILS 670,000,000 (2015)
- Number of employees: 900 (2018)
- Parent: Limagrain
- Website: hazera.com

Hazera Seeds Ltd. is a company that breeds, cultivates, develops, manufactures and markets a wide variety of vegetable seeds for the international farming industry.

== History ==
Hazera (he: הזרע; the Seed) was founded in 1939 by Tzadok (Češek) Rosenthal from kibbutz Gan Shmuel along with Aryeh Partzi, Menachem Fruchter and Yehuda Grinker, all members of the secretariat of Vegetable Growers Organization, for the purpose of developing experimental farms and seeds for farmers in Israel. It was incorporated as a company in 1955.

The main site was founded in the 1950s in Haifa under the name "Hamashbir Zraim". It was later renamed "Hazera" and kept that name until it was demolished in 2010 to make way for an business and industry zone.

In 1992 the investment subsidiary of Bank Hapoalim has made a substantial investment in the company, a move which increased its sales and made it profitable.

In 1998 it was split into "Hazera Genetics" company, which continued to develop seeds, and "Hazera 1939", which holds the farms and other real estate.

In 2003 the majority shares were purchased by the Groupe Limagrain, an international agricultural co-operative group headquartered in France. In 2008 it was merged with Dutch company Nickerson-Zwaan.

In 2012 Hazera became the first seed company to participate in the initiative of Fair Planet, a nonprofit organization which helps introduce commercial seeds and farming practices of the developed world into Africa. This is due to the fact that the organization was founded by a former employee, Dr. Shoshan Haran.

== Core business ==
The company focuses on development and cultivation of vegetables varieties. Most notable among the vegetable and plant seeds it produces are: tomato, watermelon, cotton, bell pepper, radish, cabbage, Cucumber and leek. Of those, with a 10% global market share, the roughly 20 tomatoes types it has developed are responsible for around a quarter of their revenue and yield the highest profit margin.

It has two headquarters – one in Israel and the other in the Netherlands. It has 16 subsidiaries in Europe, North America, Africa and Asia, and distributors in over 80 countries globally.

The company invests around 20% of its revenue in R&D, and around 30% of its employees work in R&D.
