= Fair Planet =

Farming non-profit

- Founded: 2012; 14 years ago
- Founder: Shoshan Haran
- Type: Nonprofit organization
- Region served: Africa
- Website: www.fairplanet.ngo

Fair Planet is an Israeli non-profit organization that operates in rural communities in east Africa to increase food security and provide economic opportunities to smallholder farmers.

== Origin and objective ==
Fair Planet was founded by Dr. Shoshan Haran in 2012 as a means to provide local farmers in Africa access to seeds and farming practices of the developed world.

According Fair Planet analysis, local seed varieties are highly susceptible to pests and diseases and the crops have very short shelf life. Average yield of tomato crop produced from local seeds is 7,670 Kg / Ha, about 20% of the yield achieved when using high quality seed varieties. This results in malnutrition and poverty, and limits the farmers to subsistence farming. Climate change and occasional outbreak of pests threaten their survival.

In contrast, professional high quality seeds varieties, which are used throughout the industrial world, are resistant to many pests and diseases, the crops are of high quality and long shelf life, minimizing post-harvest losses. However, seed companies largely ignore Africa in general and small-scale farmers in particular due to the small-scale nature of the farming, and the poor infrastructure, which mean that the market is largely not profitable.

The NPO therefore seeks a long-term technology transfer process – on the one hand facilitating access of smallholder farmers to seed of the highest-quality vegetable varieties suitable for their need, and on the other hand, training the farmers to use these seeds with minimal changes to their traditional production.

== Model ==
Fair Planet aims to bridge that gap with a unique model that combines volunteer work, local public entities and global seed companies.

At the first stage, Fair Planet collaborates with local public entities and with the private sector to builds a working model that is intended to be scalable and durable impact. They collect data on local market demand for specific crop types and variety requirements. They visit smallholder farmers to learn and understand their technical and economic farming capacity.

The next stage consists of performing technology adaptation trials and knowledge transfer materials. The NPO teams up with local farmers and perform independent adaptation variety trials and selects the best locally performing varieties. As each such agronomic region requires their own seed varieties, it is necessary to test each variety in the specific agro-climatic zone over several production seasons. As of 2025 hundreds of commercially available seed varieties have been tested of 14 different types of crops such as tomato, pepper, cabbage, potato, etc. Through collaboration with seed companies such as Limagrain (through Hazera subsidiary), Bayer and others, Fair Planet has access to over 80% of the commercial vegetable seed varieties.

The next step is to train the local farmers in Good Agricultural Practices. For this purpose the NPO has developed guideline material made suitable for illiterate farmers. Fair Planet agronomic volunteers train lead farmers and also train local trainers, building their capacity to independently train farmers in good agricultural practices and upscale the impact. During village seminars and open days they demonstrate best practices and share lead farmers' success with neighboring farmers.

== Impact ==
As of 2025, lead farmers showed significant yield increases in a variety of vegetables. For example, trials conducted by Fair Planet showed cabbage yields have risen from 14 tonnes to 70 tonnes per hectare, and tomato yield can increase up to eightfold.

Fair Planet launched its first projects in Ethiopia (in Dire Dawa, Harar and Butajira). By 2020 it has expanded also to Tanzania (Morogoro), and in 2022, through collaboration with the International Seed Federation it has started operating in Rwanda as well, spanning three major climate regions in total. As of 2025, the organization reports to have trained 600 local trainers, and over 3,500 farmers, with over 90% of farmers reporting improved nutrition and improved income. The organization estimates that in Ethiopia alone an additional 75000 neighbor farmers were reached thanks do diffusion of knowledge.

A social impact measurement and evaluation done by the Hebrew University of Jerusalem, estimates that the projects have positively influenced half a million people. 95% of the families have improved their nutrition, 83% of the families used the additional income to send their children to school. 92% of the families enjoy better health services. Almost all of the farmers have opened saving accounts and continue to invest if varied sources of income in a sustainable manner.

In 2025 it was reported that Fair Planet's activity in Rwanda is under threat of termination due to suspension of USAID under the Trump Administration.
