= KWS Saat =

German biotechnology company

KWS SAAT SE & Co. KGaA
- Type: Public (Kommanditgesellschaft auf Aktien with a Societas Europaea as general partner)
- Traded as: FWB: KWS; SDAX
- Industry: Agriculture, Biotechnology
- Predecessor: (1856) Rabbethge, Giesecke & Reinecke OHG (offene Handelsgesellschaft) (1864) Rabbethge & Giesecke OHG (1885) Conversion of the OHG into Zuckerfabrik (sugar refinery) Klein Wanzleben formerly Rabbethge & Giesecke AG (1937) Rabbethge & Giesecke AG (1946) Rescue company Rabbethge & Giesecke Saatzucht GmbH (1951) Kleinwanzlebener Saatzucht formerly Rabbethge & Giesecke AG (1975) KWS Kleinwanzlebener Saatzucht AG formerly Rabbethge & Giesecke (1999) KWS SAAT AG (2015) KWS SAAT SE (2019) KWS SAAT SE & Co. KGaA
- Founded: Klein Wanzleben, Germany (1856)
- Founder: Matthias Christian Rabbethge
- Headquarters: Einbeck, Germany
- Area served: Europe, North America, South America, Asia, the Middle East, North Africa
- Key people: Felix Büchting (CEO), Hagen Duenbostel (Chairman of the supervisory board)
- Products: seeds varieties for : sugar beet, corn, cereals, vegetables
- Revenue: €1,676 million (2024/25)
- Net income: €236.3 million (2024/25)
- Total assets: € 2,676.2 million (2024/25)
- Owner: As of 30 June 2025: Family Büchting, Family Arend Oetker, Family Tessner 69.3% (thereof 15.4% Tessner Beteiligungs GmbH) . Free float 30.7%
- Number of employees: 5,102 (2024/2025)
- Subsidiaries: the largest subsidiaries are: AgReliant Genetics LLC., (50%)- (USA) cereals: KWS LOCHOW GMBH (100%)- (Germany)
- Website: http://www.kws.com

KWS SAAT SE & Co. KGaA (ISIN: DE0007074007) is a European independent and family-owned company based in Germany that focuses on plant breeding, with breeding and distribution activities in about 70 countries. KWS is one of the largest seed producer worldwide. The product range includes seed varieties for sugar beet, corn, cereals and vegetables. KWS stands for Klein Wanzlebener Saatzucht, which means seed breeding from Klein Wanzleben. The company's original headquarters were in Klein Wanzleben, an East German town located near the city of Magdeburg. Since 1945, the company is headquartered in Einbeck, Germany. Its main markets are in Europe, North and South America as well as Asia. In 1954, the company went public on the Hamburg-Hannover Stock Exchange and has been on the SDAX list of the Frankfurt Stock Exchange since June 2006. In addition, the shares are listed in the Nisax20 index of shares in Lower Saxony.

== History ==
In 1838 the Kleinwanzleben Zuckerfabrik (Kleinwanzleben Sugar Refinery) was founded as a stock company. In 1856 the majority of its shares were acquired by the sugar beet grower and farmer Matthias Christian Rabbethge, one of the pioneers of the German sugar industry. In the same year he and his then future son-in-law Julius Giesecke founded a general commercial partnership (OHG). In 1885 the Rabbethge & Giesecke OHG became a joint stock company (Aktiengesellschaft) under the name Zuckerfabrik Klein Wanzleben formerly Rabbethge & Giesecke Aktiengesellschaft (AG). The first international branch of KWS was established in 1900 in the Ukrainian town, the largest sugar beet growing region in the world at the time. In 1920 the company began to expand its business into corn, fodder beet and potato breeding. In 1937 it was changed into Rabbethge & Giesecke AG because the Reichsnährstand did not want any anonymous investors in the agriculture and forestry sector. After the Second World War the company was relocated to the Lower Saxonian city of Einbeck which has been its headquarters since then. To this end, the most experienced employees and their families were brought to Einbeck in the British zone together with their families in a well-organized military action before the first Soviet occupation troops reached Klein Wanzleben on July 1, 1945. Thanks to the leading sugar beet variety “Kleinwanzlebener E”, the company quickly returned to success and began to reactivate its foreign relations. Following the relocation to Einbeck, KWS focused on the breeding of sugar beet, corn, rapeseed, sunflower, cereals and potatoes. In the years directly after the war, the company became an important supplier to the West German sugar beet industry. In 1946 a rescue company was established under the name Rabbethge & Giesecke Saatzucht GmbH. The foundation of this rescue company was necessary in order to continue the Western activities of the original joint stock company, which was still based in Klein Wanzleben. In 1951 the two companies were merged and took the title Kleinwanzlebener Saatzucht formerly Rabbethge & Giesecke AG and expanded its breeding program to include corn, oil and protein plants, including rapeseed and sunflowers. Since 1963 it has established subsidiaries in Europe, North and South America, Asisa and North Africa.

In 1975 it was changed into KWS Kleinwanzlebener Saatzucht AG formerly Rabbethge & Giesecke and then finally reduced to KWS SAAT AG in 1999. In spring 2015, KWS SAAT AG was renamed the European stock corporation KWS SAAT SE. At the beginning of July 2019, KWS completed a transformation of its legal form into KWS SAAT SE & Co. KGaA.

== Expansion and acquisitions ==
In the 1950s the company began intensifying its business in Western and South European countries. At the same time, it also started to expand its activities in the US sugar beet market. Since 1956, KWS has been setting up subsidiaries and affiliates in Europe and overseas and opening foreign representative offices, e.g. in Turkey and Chile. In the following decades, the company systematically expanded its presence in the temperate climate zone. KWS had been breeding wheat and barley at its Peragis subsidiary since the 1920s. In 1964, Peragis was merged with Saatzucht Heine to form Heine-Peragis in Einbeck. In 1967/68 it began merging its cereal breeding activities with the companies Heine-Peragis and Lochow-Petkus GmbH. In 2008, KWS acquired Lochow-Petkus GmbH which was subsequently renamed KWS LOCHOW GMBH. In 1975, the company acquired the Rinn family's shares in Lochow-Petkus GmbH and has held around 81% of the shares since then; the remaining 19% are held by descendants of Ferdinand von Lochow. In 1978 it founded KWS Seeds Inc. to manage all business activities in North America. In 1984 KWS responded to the rapid advances in molecular biology by founding PLANTA Applied Plant Genetics and Biotechnology. PLANTA is responsible for R&D projects in the company and provides services for all breeding activities of KWS. In the 1990s the company acquired the Argentinean breeding company Trebol Sur which was then renamed KWS Argentina in 1997.

In 2000 the French plant breeding group Limagrain and KWS decided to merge their corn business in North America and formed the joint venture AgReliant. In 2003 KWS founded KWS Türk in Turkey to enhance the distribution of seeds in North Africa (Morocco, Tunisia, Libya and Egypt) and Middle Eastern countries including Iran, Iraq and Lebanon. In 2008 KWS and the Dutch Van Rijn Group established a joint venture in breeding potato seeds and in April 2011 KWS acquired the remaining interests in Van Rijn and formed the subsidiary KWS POTATO B.V. In September 2011 it founded a joint venture with the Chinese company Kenfeng to manage the production and distribution of corn seed in China. In October 2011 KWS and the French seed producer Vilmorin formed a research collaboration as a 50/50 joint venture company to develop GM corn traits.

In June 2012 KWS acquired the Brazilian companies SEMÍLIA and DELTA that are located in Paraná and run four breeding stations in Brazil. On 1 July 2012 both companies merged to form KWS BRASIL PESQUISA & SEMENTES LTDA. As of 1 July 2012, KWS acquired a majority shareholder position in the company RIBER whose name was then changed to RIBER – KWS SEMENTES S.A. This company, situated in the Brazilian state Minas Gerais, continued its focus on the Brazilian market through offering GM corn hybrids and soybean varieties.

With the acquisition of the Dutch company Pop Vriend Seeds on 1 July 2019, KWS entered into the vegetable seed business to become a leading supplier of vegetable seeds mid-term. PopVriend Seeds (PV) became KWS Vegetables Netherlands B.V. on October 1, 2024. From 2024, KWS, is increasingly focusing on diversity and profitable growth and divested its corn business in South America and China. In contrast to the calendar year, KWS has a fiscal year from 1 July to 30 June.

== Current portfolio ==
KWS is developing new varieties and selling seeds of various crops: sugarbeet, corn, wheat, rye, barley, sorghum, sunflower and vegetables (melon, watermelon, cucumber, tomato, pepper, green bean and spinach).

== Research and collaboration ==
The company invested about 326 mio. € of its turnover in fiscal year 23/24 in research and development to develop new seed varieties adapted to agricultural requirements, climatic conditions and geological conditions. KWS uses various breeding methods such as cross & selection, line and hybrid breeding, digital phenotyping, genetic engineering and genome editing.

== Bibliography ==
- Betina Meißner, "Planting Seeds for Success," Wallstein Publishing House, Göttingen, 2007, pp. 90–91.
- Detlef Diestel, "Sugar Refinery Klein Wanzleben from Foundation to 1917/18," in Landwirtschaft und Kapitalismus, Bd. 1, Teil 2, Berlin 1979, pp. 63–90.
