= Wanzleben =

Town in Saxony-Anhalt, Germany

- Stadtteil of Wanzleben-Börde
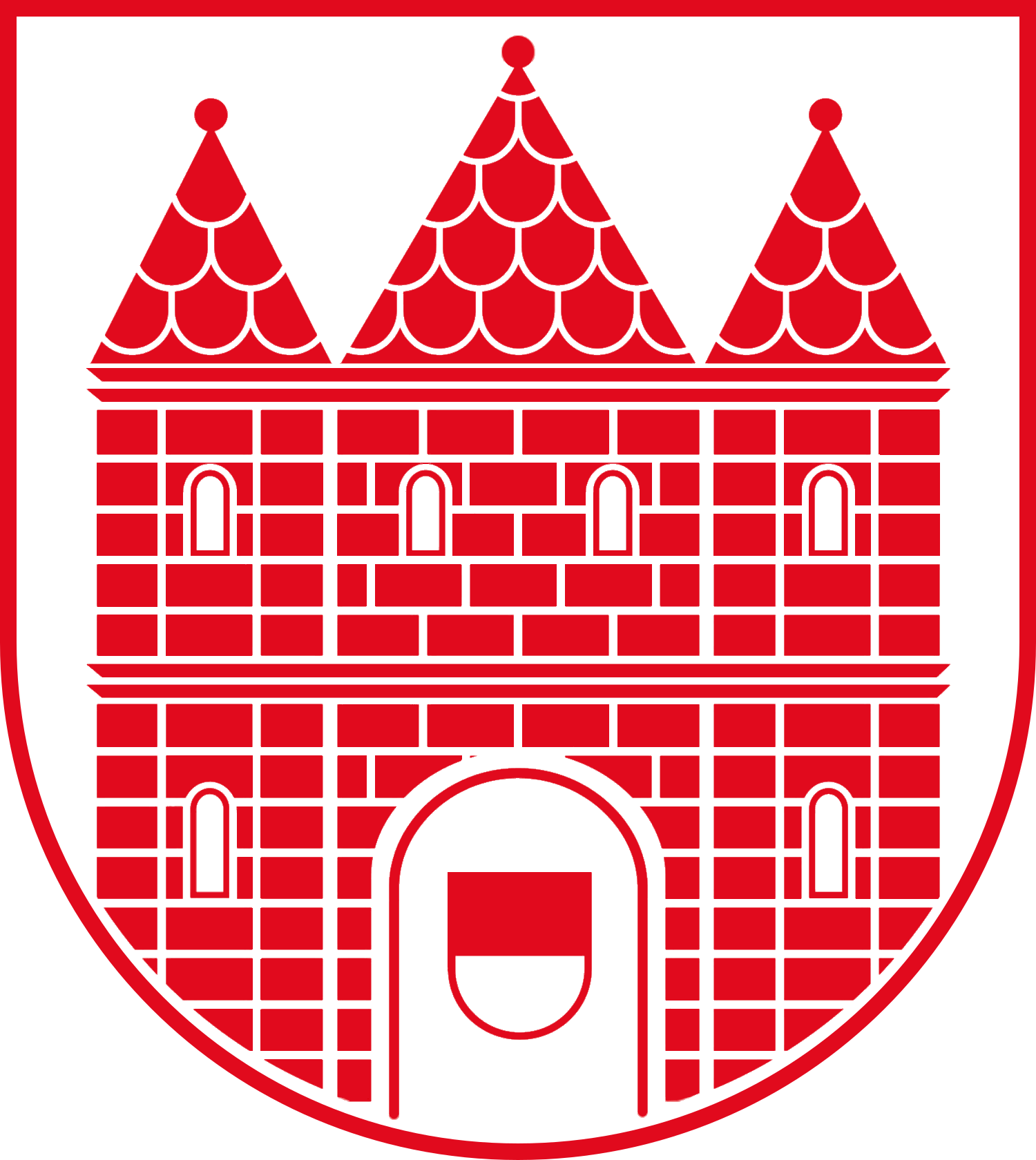
- Coat of arms
- Interactive map of Wanzleben
- Location within Germany Location within Saxony-Anhalt
- Coordinates: 52°4′N 11°26′E
- Country: Germany
- State: Saxony-Anhalt
- District: Börde
- Town: Wanzleben-Börde
- Subdivisions: 4

Area
  - Total: 44.64 km^{2} (17.24 sq mi)
- Elevation: 97 m (318 ft)

Population (2006-12-31)
  - Total: 5,294
  - Density: 118.6/km^{2} (307.2/sq mi)
- Time zone: UTC+01:00 (CET)
  - Summer (DST): UTC+02:00 (CEST)
- Postal codes: 39164
- Dialling codes: 039209
- Vehicle registration: BK
- Website: www.wanzleben.de

Wanzleben (German pronunciation: [ˈvantsˌleːbn̩]) is a town and a former municipality in the Börde district, in Sachsen-Anhalt, Germany. Between 2004 and 2010 it was the seat of the Verwaltungsgemeinschaft Börde Wanzleben. Since 1 January 2010, it is part of the town Wanzleben-Börde. It is situated approximately 15 km southwest of Magdeburg.

== People ==
- Martin Bangemann (1934–2022), politician
