= Matthias Christian Rabbethge =

German sugar beet grower and sugar manufacturer

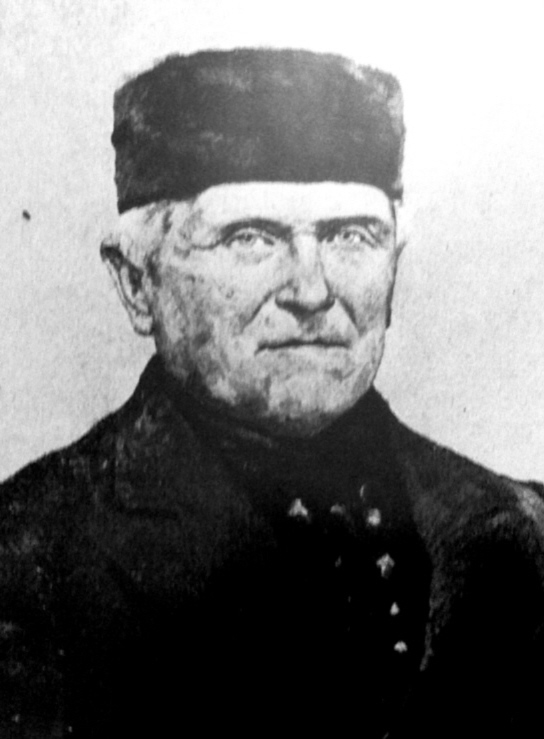
Matthias Christian Rabbethge

Matthias Christian Rabbethge (1 March 1804, Klein Rodensleben – 26 December 1902, Klein Wanzleben) was a German sugar beet grower and sugar manufacturer.
