= Dessau-Roßlau =

Town in Saxony-Anhalt, Germany

- Town
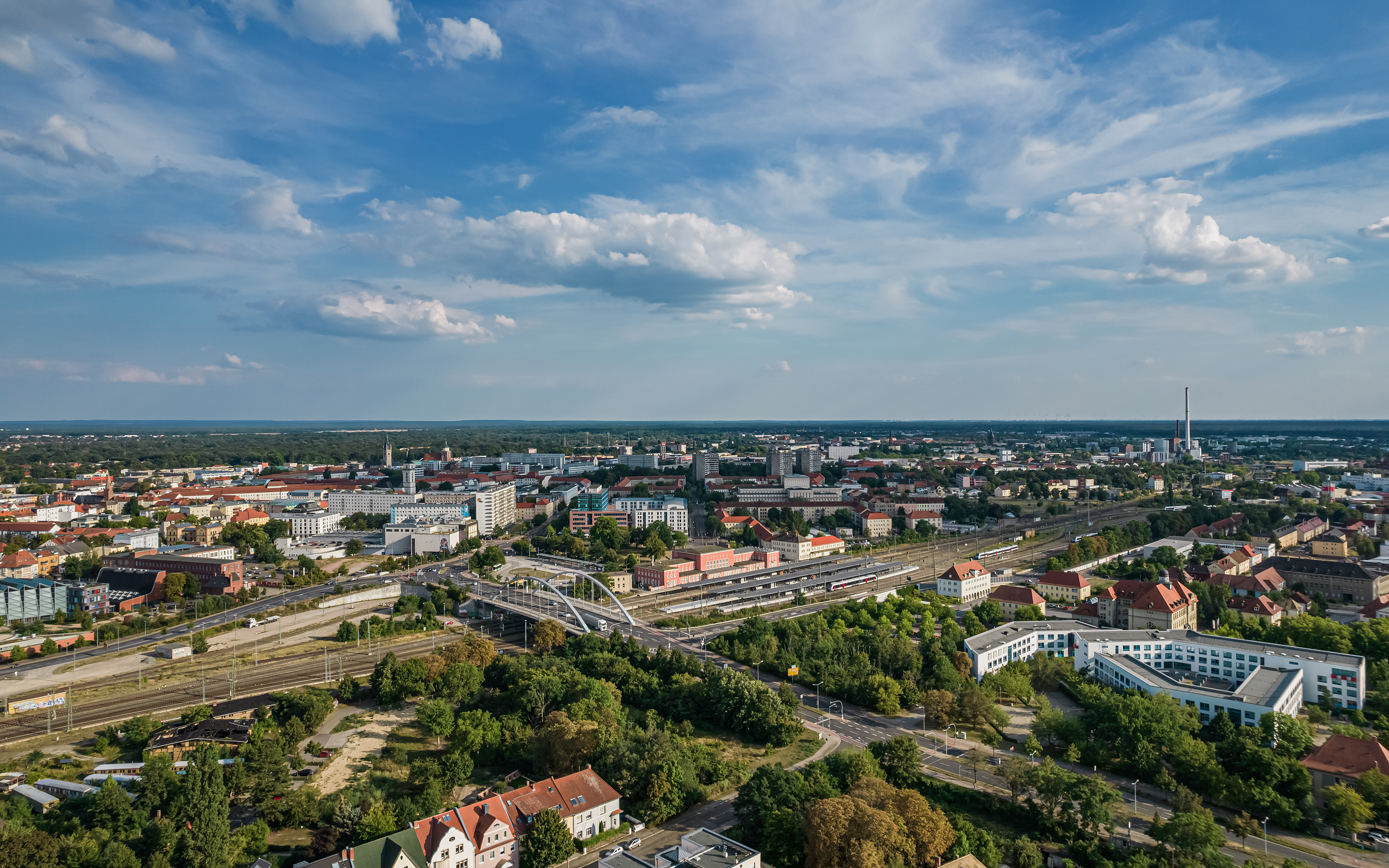
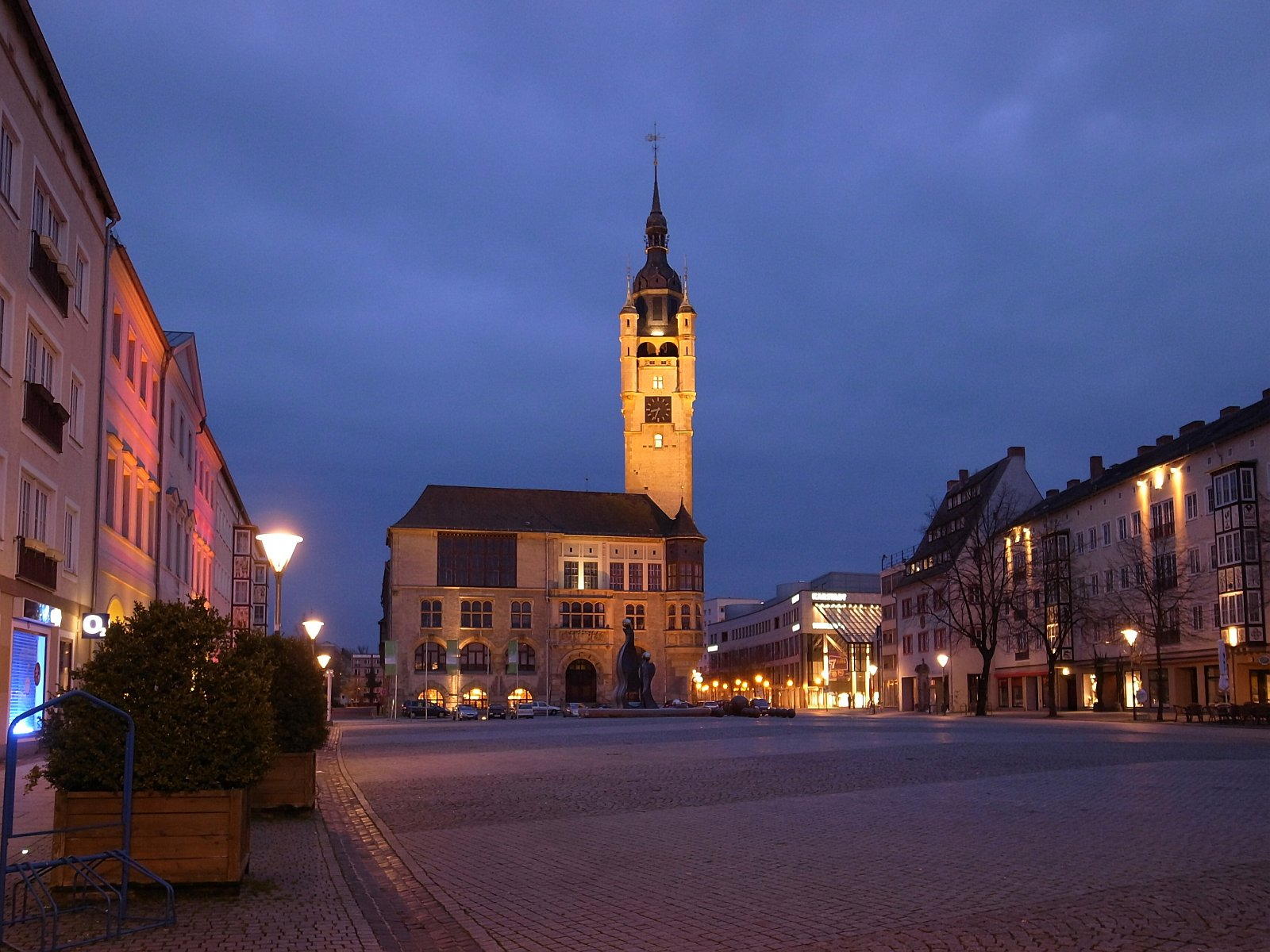
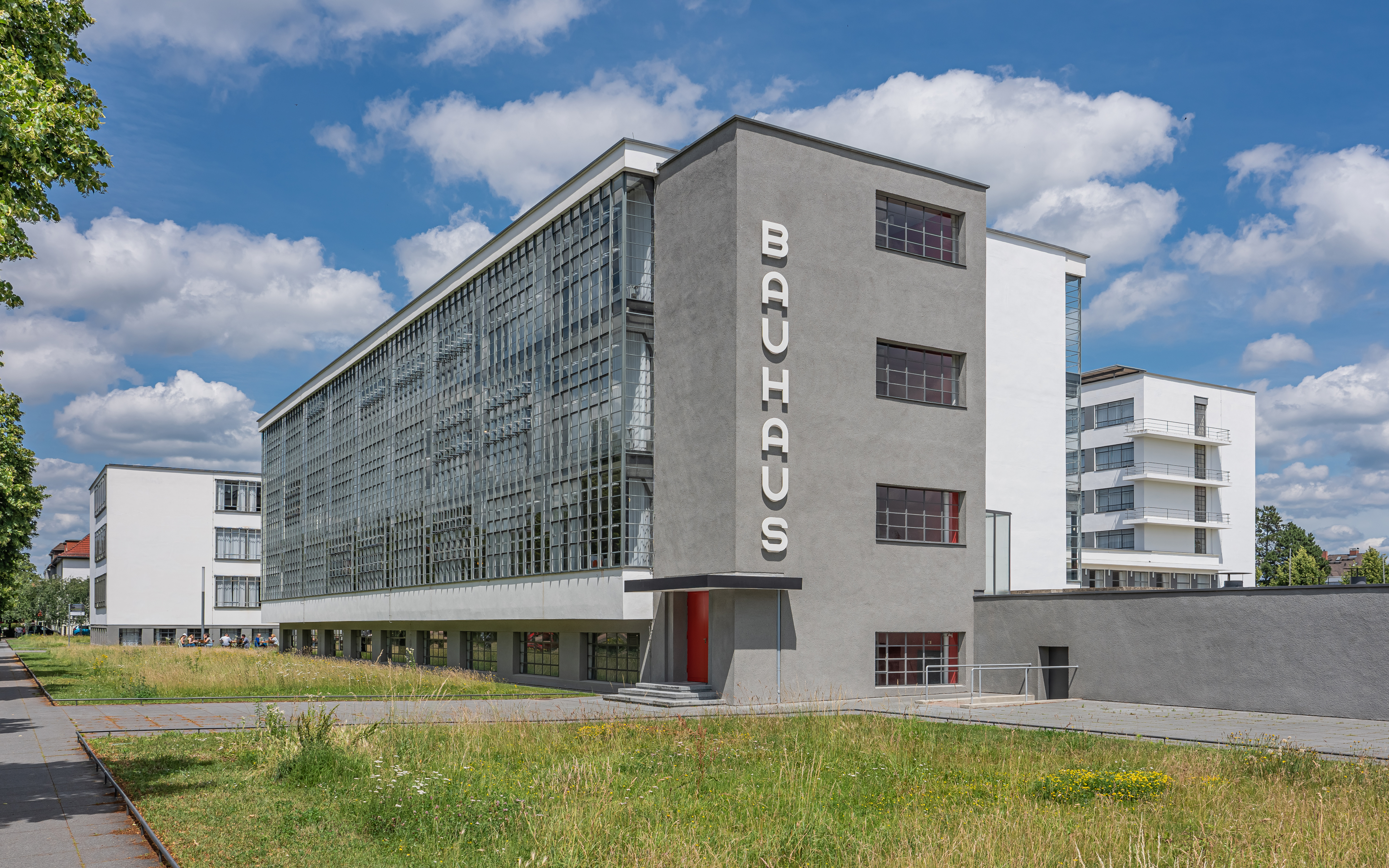
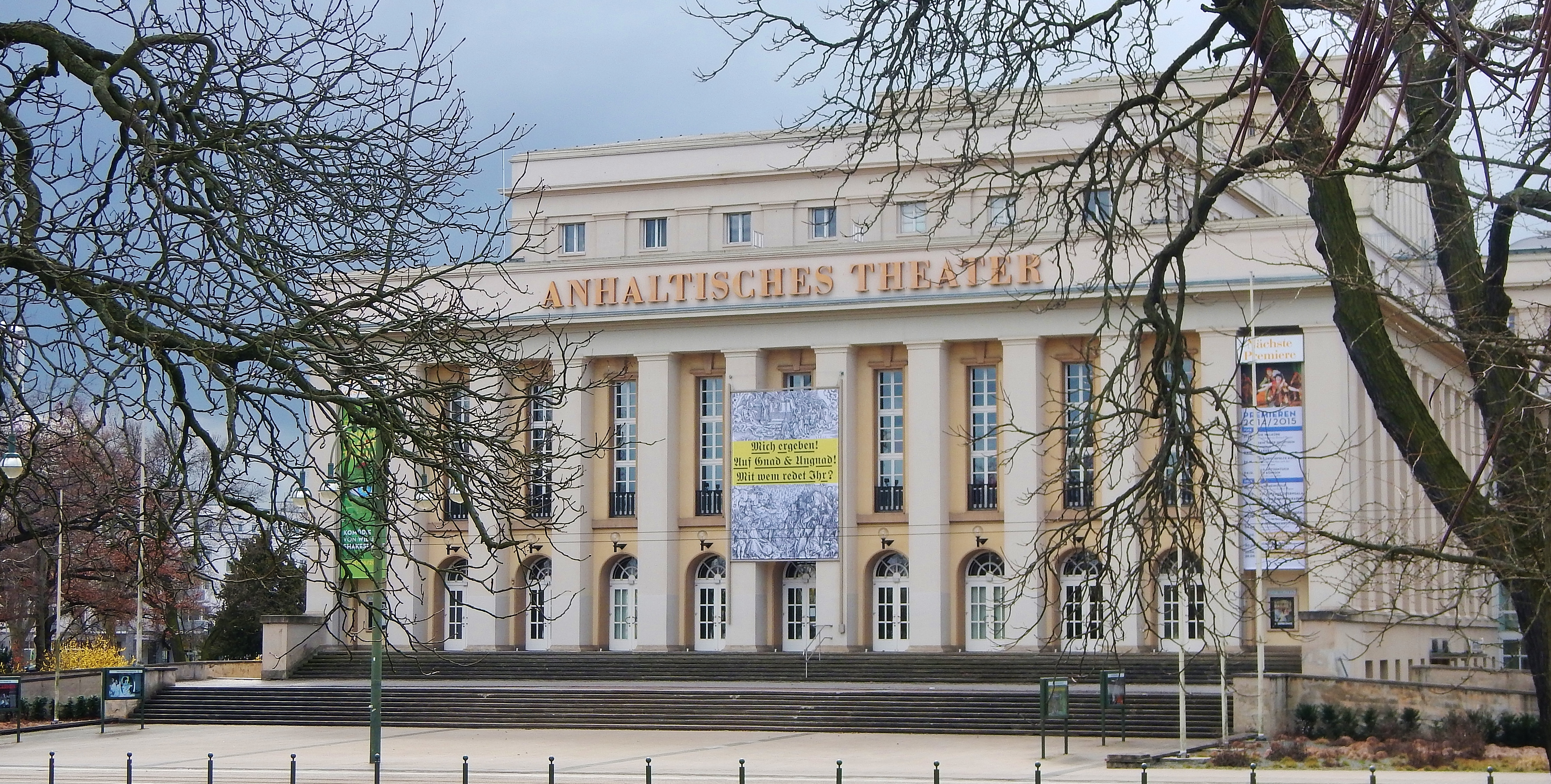
- Aerial view of Dessau Townhall Bauhaus Dessau Anhaltisches Theater

- Flag Coat of arms
- Interactive map of Dessau-Roßlau
- Location within Germany Location within Saxony-Anhalt
- Coordinates: 51°50′N 12°15′E
- Country: Germany
- State: Saxony-Anhalt
- District: Urban district

Government
  - Mayor (2021–28): Robert Reck

Area
  - Total: 245.0 km^{2} (94.6 sq mi)
- Elevation: 61 m (200 ft)

Population (2025-12-31)
  - Total: 75,035
  - Density: 306.3/km^{2} (793.2/sq mi)
- Time zone: UTC+01:00 (CET)
  - Summer (DST): UTC+02:00 (CEST)
- Postal codes: 06811-06849; 06861, 06862
- Dialling codes: 0340 (Dessau); 034901(Roßlau)
- Vehicle registration: DE, RSL
- Website: www.dessau-rosslau.de

Dessau-Roßlau (German pronunciation: [ˈdɛsaʊ ˈʁɔslaʊ]) is a kreisfreie Stadt (independent town) in the German state of Saxony-Anhalt. It is situated at the confluence of the rivers Elbe and Mulde. The town was formed by merging the towns of Dessau and Roßlau as part of the 2007 regional boundary reform of Saxony-Anhalt (Kreisreform Sachsen-Anhalt). The reform involved a reduction in the number of rural districts in the state from 21 to 11, in anticipation of a continued population decline.

Dessau-Roßlau is the third largest town of Saxony-Anhalt by population, after Magdeburg and Halle (Saale). Its area is 245.0 km^{2} (94.6 sq mi).

== Dessau ==
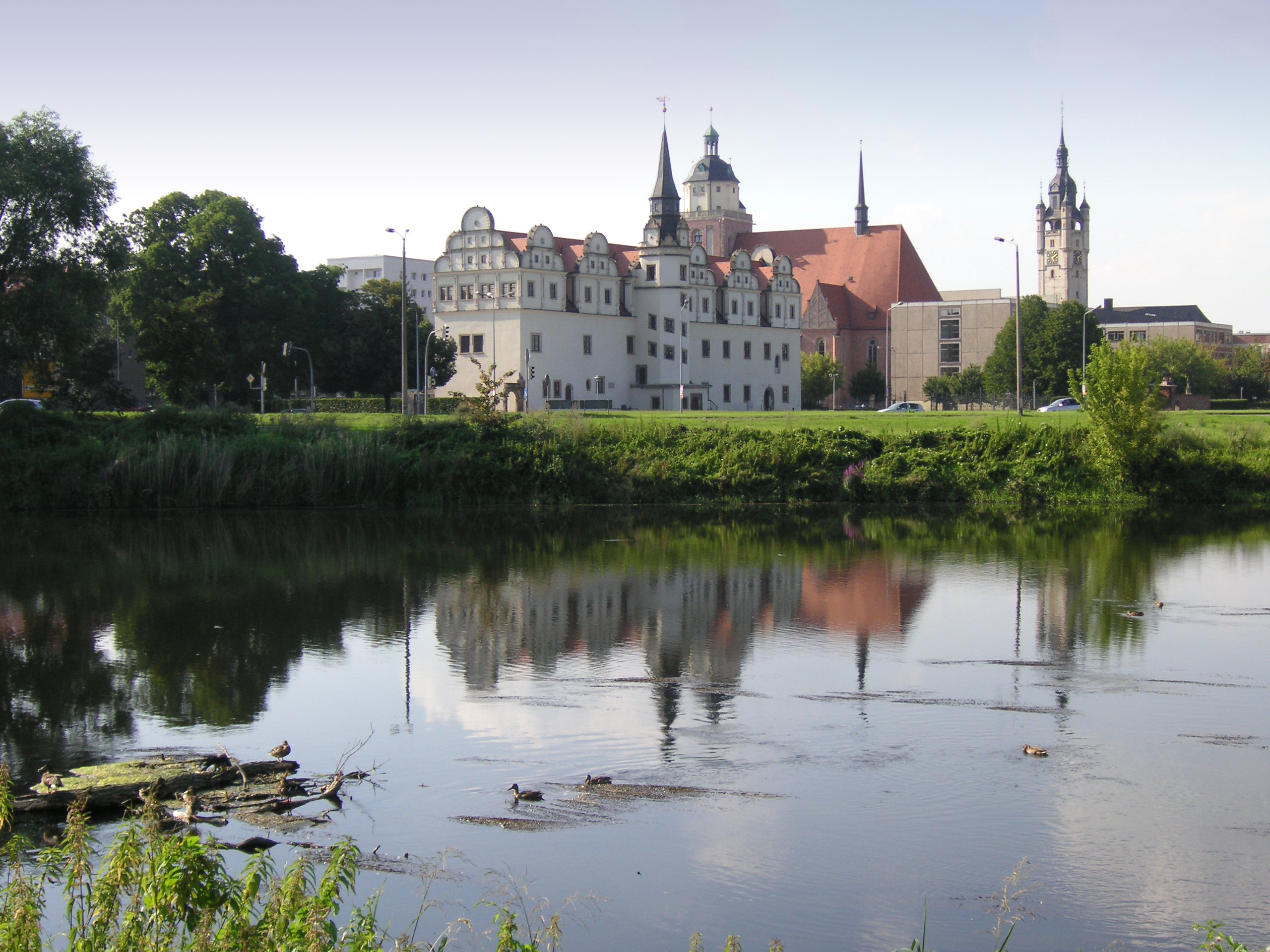
The river Mulde with the Dessau Palace, St. Maries church and town hall

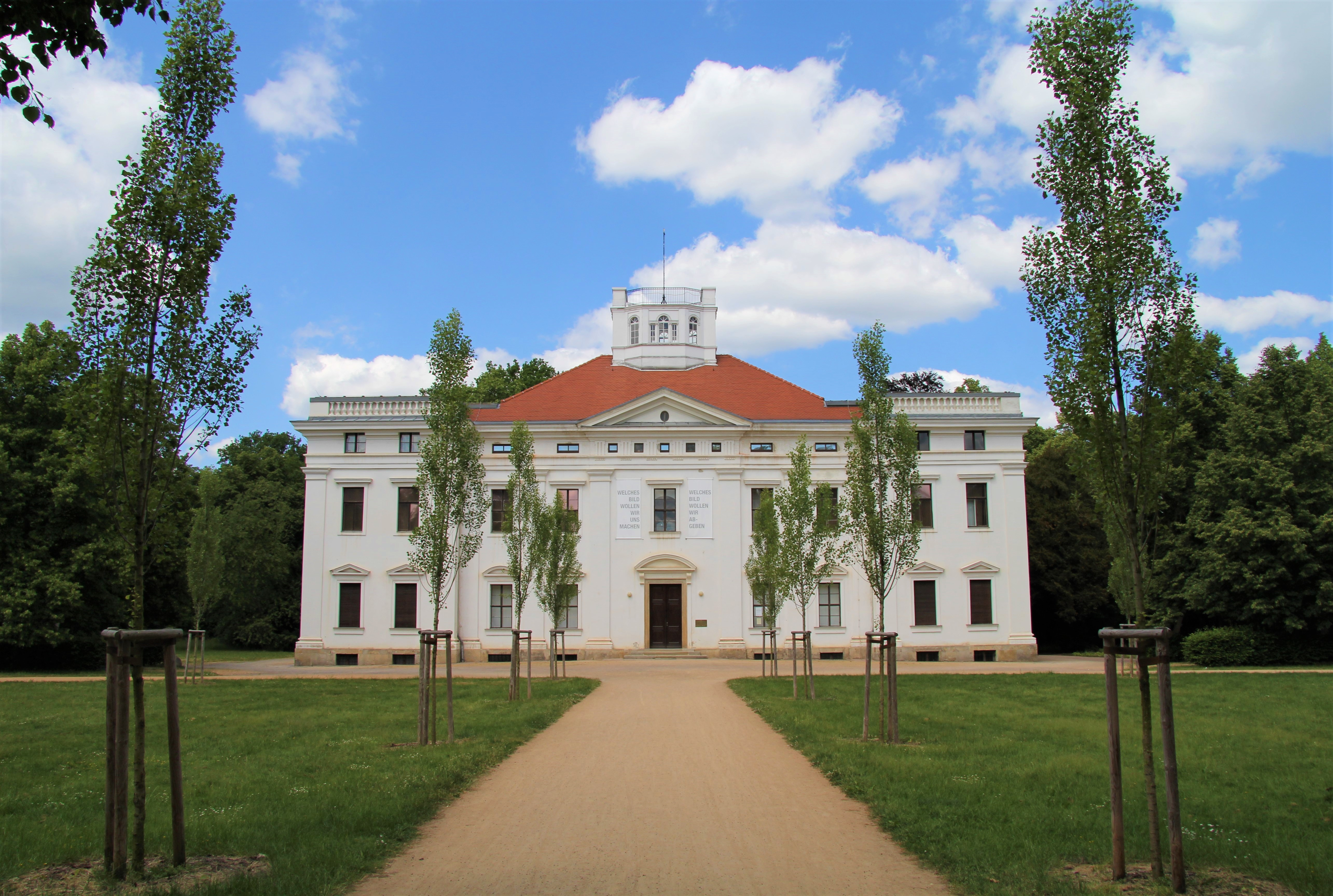
Georgium, Dessau

Dessau is the largest population centre within Dessau-Roßlau, with approximately 79,000 inhabitants (2021). Most of the town is located on the left bank of the river Mulde, south of its confluence with the river Elbe. Dessau was first mentioned in 1213, and became the capital of a small state (Anhalt-Dessau) in the 14th century. Between 1863 and 1918, it was the capital of Anhalt. Since the second half of the 19th century, Dessau has been an industrial town. With the famous art and architecture school Bauhaus, located in Dessau between 1925 and 1932, and the Dessau-Wörlitz Garden Realm, the town features two UNESCO World Heritage Sites. The town could be referred to as one of the birthplaces of the "Jet Age" because the Junkers factory that designed the Jumo 004 jet engine for the German Me 262 jet fighter (operational from mid-1944) was designed there. As the western shore of the Elbe-Mulde rivers was the stopping point for U.S. troops in World War II, the capture of the town allowed the U.S. Army to evacuate Junkers employees to the west before Russia occupied the area on 1 July 1945. Several engineers of the jet engine development team at Junkers ended up at the Lycoming engine plant in Stratford, Conn., building gas turbine engines for the U.S. Army from 1952 on.

== Roßlau ==
Roßlau has approximately 13,000 inhabitants (2006). It is located on the right bank of the Elbe, near its confluence with the Mulde, about 7 kilometers north of the centre of Dessau. Roßlau was first mentioned in 1215. Before it merged with Dessau, it was part of the district Anhalt-Zerbst.

== Governance ==
=== Mayor and city council ===
The current mayor of Dessau-Roßlau is independent politician Robert Reck since 2021. The most recent mayoral election was held on 6 June 2021, with a runoff held on 27 June, and the results were as follows:

| Candidate | Party | First round | | Second round | |
| Candidate | Party | Votes | % | Votes | % |
|---|---|---|---|---|---|
| Robert Reck | Independent | 10,548 | 28.4 | 14,856 | 73.9 |
| Eiko Adamek | Christian Democratic Union | 7,913 | 21.3 | 5,255 | 26.1 |
| Ralf-Peter Weber | Alliance 90/The Greens | 6,119 | 16.5 | | |
| Sebastian Rumberg | Independent | 4,229 | 11.4 | | |
| Lutz Büttner | Alternative for Germany | 3,906 | 10.5 | | |
| Frank Lehmann | Independent | 2,823 | 7.6 | | |
| Jakob Uwe Weber | Independent | 1,209 | 3.3 | | |
| Karsten Rudolf Lückemeyer | Independent | 417 | 1.1 | | |
| Valid votes | | 37,164 | 100.0 | 20,111 | 100.0 |
| Invalid votes | | 563 | 1.5 | 82 | 0.4 |
| Total | | 37,727 | 100.0 | 20,193 | 100.0 |
| Electorate/voter turnout | | 66,811 | 56.5 | 66,752 | 30.3 |
Source: City of Magdeburg

The most recent city council election was held on 9 June 2024, and the results were as follows:

| Party | Votes | % | +/- | Seats | +/- |
|---|---|---|---|---|---|
| Alternative for Germany (AfD) | 29,028 | 25.5 | ▲8.7 | 13 | ▲5 |
| Christian Democratic Union (CDU) | 25,112 | 22.0 | ▼0.8 | 11 | ▼1 |
| Pro Dessau-Roßlau (Pro DE) | 14,308 | 12.6 | ▲4.0 | 6 | ▲2 |
| Social Democratic Party (SPD) | 10,649 | 9.3 | ▲0.2 | 5 | 0 |
| The Left (Die Linke) | 9,096 | 8.0 | ▼6.6 | 4 | ▼3 |
| New Forum–Citizens' List (Forum-BL) | 8,092 | 7.1 | ▼1.3 | 4 | 0 |
| Alliance 90/The Greens (Grüne) | 6,243 | 5.5 | ▼4.6 | 3 | ▼2 |
| Free Faction Dessau-Roßlau | 5,634 | 4.9 | 0.0 | 2 | ▼1 |
| Free Democratic Party (FDP) | 3,276 | 2.9 | ▼1.8 | 1 | ▼1 |
| Weber (Independent) | 1,885 | 1.7 | New | 1 | New |
| Ribbecke (Independent) | 648 | 0.6 | New | 0 | New |
| Valid votes | 113,971 | 100.0 | | | |
| Invalid ballots | 717 | 0.2 | | | |
| Total ballots | 39,413 | 100.0 | | 50 | ±0 |
| Electorate/voter turnout | 64,726 | 60.9 | ▲7.1 | | |
Source: City of Magdeburg

=== Twin towns – sister cities ===
Dessau-Roßlau is twinned with:

- Argenteuil, France (1959)
- Klagenfurt, Austria (1971)
- Ludwigshafen, Germany (1988)
- Ibbenbüren, Germany (1990)
- Gliwice, Poland (1992)
- Vilnius District Municipality, Lithuania (1995)
- Roudnice nad Labem, Czech Republic (2004)
