= Andreas Sigismund Marggraf =

German chemist (1709–1782)

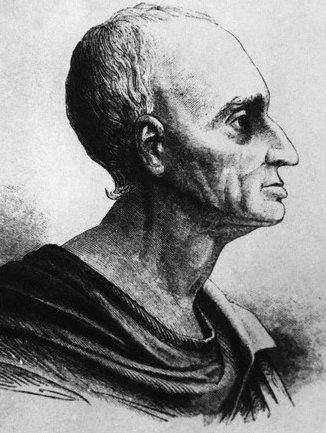
- Engraving of Marggraf, c. 1770
- Born: 3 March 1709; Berlin, Margraviate of Brandenburg
- Died: 7 August 1782 (aged 73); Berlin, Margraviate of Brandenburg
- Known for: Isolating zinc Isolating glucose
- Scientific career
- Notable students: Franz Karl Achard

Andreas Sigismund Marggraf (German: [ˈmaʀkɡʀaːf]; 3 March 1709 – 7 August 1782) was a German chemist from Berlin, then capital of the Margraviate of Brandenburg, and a pioneer of analytical chemistry. He isolated zinc in 1746 by heating calamine and carbon. Though he was not the first to do so, Marggraf is credited with carefully describing the process and establishing its basic theory. In 1747, Marggraf announced his discovery of sugar in beets and devised a method using alcohol to extract it. His student Franz Achard later devised an economical industrial method to extract the sugar in its pure form.

== Life ==
Andreas Sigismund Marggraf was the son of the pharmacist Henning Christian Marggraf (1680–1754), who owned a pharmacy in Berlin and lectured at the Collegium Medico-Chirurgicum (medical/surgical school). Marggraf came in contact with the pharmaceutical and medical business early and started studying at the medical school in 1725. He studied with Caspar Neumann in Berlin, visited pharmacies in other cities, including Frankfurt am Main and Strasbourg and attended lectures at the University of Halle. He worked in his father's pharmacy and focused his work on chemistry. In later life he helped to reorganize the Societät der Wissenschaften into the Akademie der Wissenschaften (Prussian Academy of Science) and became the director of the physics section in 1760. In 1774 he had a stroke, and continued working at the laboratories of the Akademie until his retirement in 1781.

== Scientific work ==
Marggraf introduced several new methods into experimental chemistry. He used precipitation methods for analysis, such as the Prussian blue reaction for the detection of iron. Marggraf's major work in inorganic chemistry included the improved production of phosphorus from urine and the detection of alkali metal salts in plant ash and their identification by flame test. Before his 1762 work, (al)chemists did not systematically distinguish between potassium and sodium salts.

His extraction of sugar from beets, which was then only available from sugarcane, was the starting point for the sugar industry in Europe, and the modern sugar industry in the world. Although Marggraf recognized the economic impact of his discovery, he did not pursue it. Marggraf's student Franz Achard, completed the work and developed an economic extraction method for sugar from sugar beet. Other students of Marggraf included Johann Gottlob Lehmann, Franz Carl Achard and probably Valentin Rose the Elder and Martin Heinrich Klaproth. He was the first to isolate glucose from raisins in 1747.

=== Isolation of zinc ===
Marggraf had isolated zinc in 1746 by heating a mixture of calamine and carbon in a closed vessel without copper. He was unaware that the same process had been developed (and patented) by William Champion in England around 1738–1740 and by Anton von Swab in Sweden around 1742. However, Marggraf described the process in great detail and established its basic theory, for which he is often credited with isolation of zinc. This procedure became commercially practical by 1752.
