= Wanzleben-Börde =

- Town
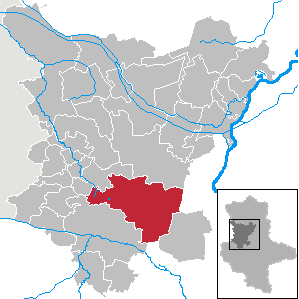
- Location of Wanzleben-Börde within Börde district
- Interactive map of Wanzleben-Börde
- Location within Germany Location within Saxony-Anhalt
- Coordinates: 52°04′N 11°26′E
- Country: Germany
- State: Saxony-Anhalt
- District: Börde

Government
  - Mayor (2017–24): Thomas Kluge (Ind.)

Area
  - Total: 188.07 km^{2} (72.61 sq mi)

Population (2025-12-31)
  - Total: 13,641
  - Density: 72.532/km^{2} (187.86/sq mi)
- Time zone: UTC+01:00 (CET)
  - Summer (DST): UTC+02:00 (CEST)
- Postal codes: 39164, 39167, 039209, 39365
- Dialling codes: 039204, 039209, 039293, 039407
- Vehicle registration: BK, BÖ, HDL, OC, OK, WMS, WZL
- Website: www.wanzleben-boerde.de

Wanzleben-Börde (German pronunciation: [ˈvantsˌleːbn̩ ˈbœʁdə]) is a town in the Börde district in Saxony-Anhalt, Germany. It was formed on 1 January 2010 by the merger of the former municipalities Bottmersdorf, Domersleben, Dreileben, Eggenstedt, Groß Rodensleben, Hohendodeleben, Klein Rodensleben, Seehausen and Wanzleben. On 1 September 2010 it absorbed Klein Wanzleben.

== Geography ==
The town Wanzleben-Börde consists of the following Ortschaften or municipal divisions:

- Bottmersdorf
- Domersleben
- Dreileben
- Eggenstedt
- Groß Rodensleben
- Hohendodeleben
- Klein Rodensleben
- Remkersleben
- Stadt Seehausen
- Stadt Wanzleben
- Zuckerdorf Klein Wanzleben
- Schleibnitz
