= Eggenstedt =

- Stadtteil of Wanzleben-Börde
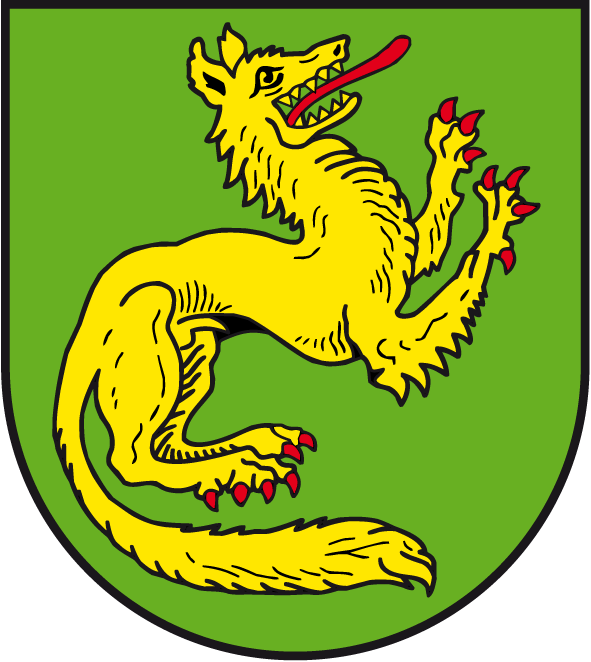
- Coat of arms
- Interactive map of Eggenstedt
- Location within Germany Location within Saxony-Anhalt
- Coordinates: 52°6′N 11°14′E
- Country: Germany
- State: Saxony-Anhalt
- District: Börde
- Town: Wanzleben-Börde

Area
  - Total: 10.99 km^{2} (4.24 sq mi)
- Elevation: 178 m (584 ft)

Population (2006-12-31)
  - Total: 282
  - Density: 25.7/km^{2} (66.5/sq mi)
- Time zone: UTC+01:00 (CET)
  - Summer (DST): UTC+02:00 (CEST)
- Postal codes: 39365
- Dialling codes: 039407

Eggenstedt is a village and a former municipality in the Börde district in Saxony-Anhalt, Germany.

Since 1 January 2010, it is part of the town Wanzleben-Börde.
