= Groß Rodensleben =

- Stadtteil of Wanzleben-Börde
- Coat of arms
- Interactive map of Groß Rodensleben
- Location within Germany Location within Saxony-Anhalt
- Coordinates: 52°7′N 11°22′E
- Country: Germany
- State: Saxony-Anhalt
- District: Börde
- Town: Wanzleben-Börde

Area
  - Total: 19.34 km^{2} (7.47 sq mi)
- Elevation: 125 m (410 ft)

Population (2008-12-31)
  - Total: 1,066
  - Density: 55.12/km^{2} (142.8/sq mi)
- Time zone: UTC+01:00 (CET)
  - Summer (DST): UTC+02:00 (CEST)
- Postal codes: 39167
- Dialling codes: 039293
- Vehicle registration: BK
- Website: www.vgemboerde.de

Groß Rodensleben is a village and a former municipality in the Börde district in Saxony-Anhalt, Germany.

Since 1 January 2010, it is part of the town Wanzleben-Börde.
