= Hohendodeleben =

- Stadtteil of Wanzleben-Börde
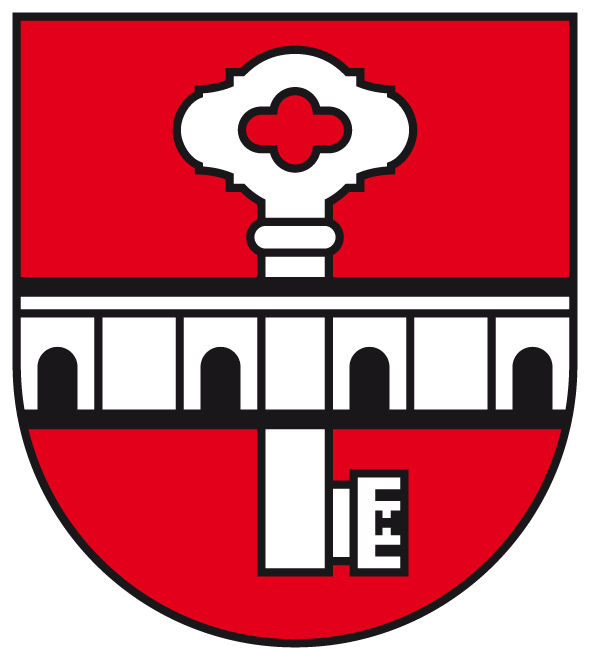
- Coat of arms
- Interactive map of Hohendodeleben
- Location within Germany Location within Saxony-Anhalt
- Coordinates: 52°6′N 11°30′E
- Country: Germany
- State: Saxony-Anhalt
- District: Börde
- Town: Wanzleben-Börde

Area
  - Total: 14.80 km^{2} (5.71 sq mi)
- Elevation: 117 m (384 ft)

Population (2006-12-31)
  - Total: 1,813
  - Density: 122.5/km^{2} (317.3/sq mi)
- Time zone: UTC+01:00 (CET)
  - Summer (DST): UTC+02:00 (CEST)
- Postal codes: 39167
- Dialling codes: 039204
- Vehicle registration: BK
- Website: hohendodeleben.de

Hohendodeleben is a village and a former municipality in the Börde district in Saxony-Anhalt, Germany.

Since 1 January 2010, it is part of the town Wanzleben-Börde.
