= Bottmersdorf =

- Stadtteil of Wanzleben-Börde
- Coat of arms
- Interactive map of Bottmersdorf
- Location within Germany Location within Saxony-Anhalt
- Coordinates: 52°02′00″N 11°26′00″E
- Country: Germany
- State: Saxony-Anhalt
- District: Börde
- Town: Wanzleben-Börde

Area
  - Total: 15 km^{2} (5.8 sq mi)
- Elevation: 88 m (289 ft)

Population (2006-12-31)
  - Total: 728
  - Density: 49/km^{2} (130/sq mi)
- Time zone: UTC+01:00 (CET)
  - Summer (DST): UTC+02:00 (CEST)
- Postal codes: 39164
- Dialling codes: 039209
- Vehicle registration: BK

Bottmersdorf is a village and a former municipality in the Börde district in Saxony-Anhalt, Germany.

Since 1 January 2010, it is part of the town Wanzleben-Börde.
