= Dreileben =

- Stadtteil of Wanzleben-Börde
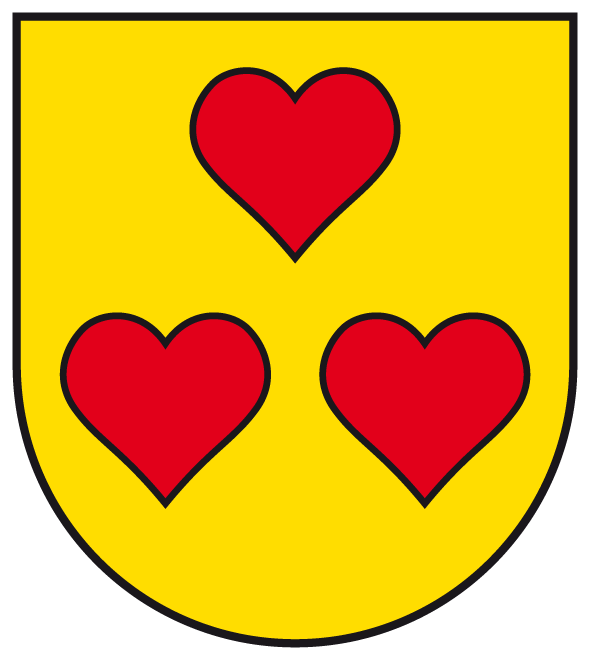
- Coat of arms
- Interactive map of Dreileben
- Location within Germany Location within Saxony-Anhalt
- Coordinates: 52°7′N 11°19′E
- Country: Germany
- State: Saxony-Anhalt
- District: Börde
- Town: Wanzleben-Börde

Area
  - Total: 15.41 km^{2} (5.95 sq mi)
- Elevation: 132 m (433 ft)

Population (2006-12-31)
  - Total: 597
  - Density: 38.7/km^{2} (100/sq mi)
- Time zone: UTC+01:00 (CET)
  - Summer (DST): UTC+02:00 (CEST)
- Postal codes: 39365
- Dialling codes: 039293
- Vehicle registration: BK

Dreileben is a village and a former municipality in the Börde district in Saxony-Anhalt, Germany. Since 1 January 2010, it is part of the town Wanzleben-Börde.

In 2011, a triple-bill of 90-minute Television movies called Dreileben was set in the village.
