= Domersleben =

- Stadtteil of Wanzleben-Börde
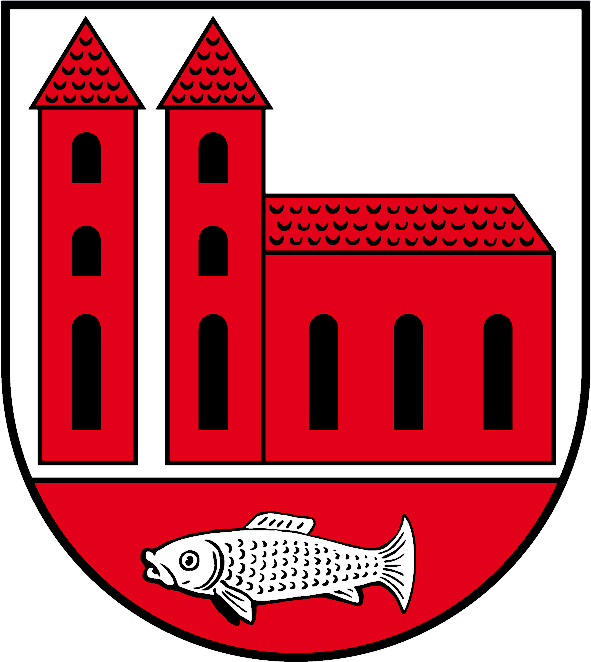
- Coat of arms
- Interactive map of Domersleben
- Location within Germany Location within Saxony-Anhalt
- Coordinates: 52°4′N 11°25′E
- Country: Germany
- State: Saxony-Anhalt
- District: Börde
- Town: Wanzleben-Börde

Area
  - Total: 15.65 km^{2} (6.04 sq mi)
- Elevation: 96 m (315 ft)

Population (2006-12-31)
  - Total: 1,143
  - Density: 73.04/km^{2} (189.2/sq mi)
- Time zone: UTC+01:00 (CET)
  - Summer (DST): UTC+02:00 (CEST)
- Postal codes: 39164
- Dialling codes: 039209
- Vehicle registration: BK
- Website: www.domersleben.de

Domersleben is a village and a former municipality in the Börde district in Saxony-Anhalt, Germany.

Since 1 January 2010, it is part of the town Wanzleben-Börde.
