= Seehausen, Börde =

Seehausen
- Stadtteil of Wanzleben-Börde
- Coat of arms
- Interactive map of Seehausen
- Location within Germany Location within Saxony-Anhalt
- Coordinates: 52°6′N 11°18′E
- Country: Germany
- State: Saxony-Anhalt
- District: Börde
- Town: Wanzleben-Börde

Area
  - Total: 18.3 km^{2} (7.1 sq mi)
- Elevation: 124 m (407 ft)

Population (2006-12-31)
  - Total: 1,892
  - Density: 103/km^{2} (268/sq mi)
- Time zone: UTC+01:00 (CET)
  - Summer (DST): UTC+02:00 (CEST)
- Postal codes: 39164
- Dialling codes: 039407
- Vehicle registration: BK
- Website: www.boerdestadt-seehausen.de

Seehausen (German pronunciation: [ˈzeːhaʊzn̩]) is a town and a former municipality in the Börde district, in Saxony-Anhalt, Germany. It is situated on the river Aller, west of Magdeburg.

Since 1 January 2010, it is part of the town Wanzleben-Börde.
