= Groupe Limagrain =

Agricultural co-operative group

Groupe Limagrain Holding S.A.
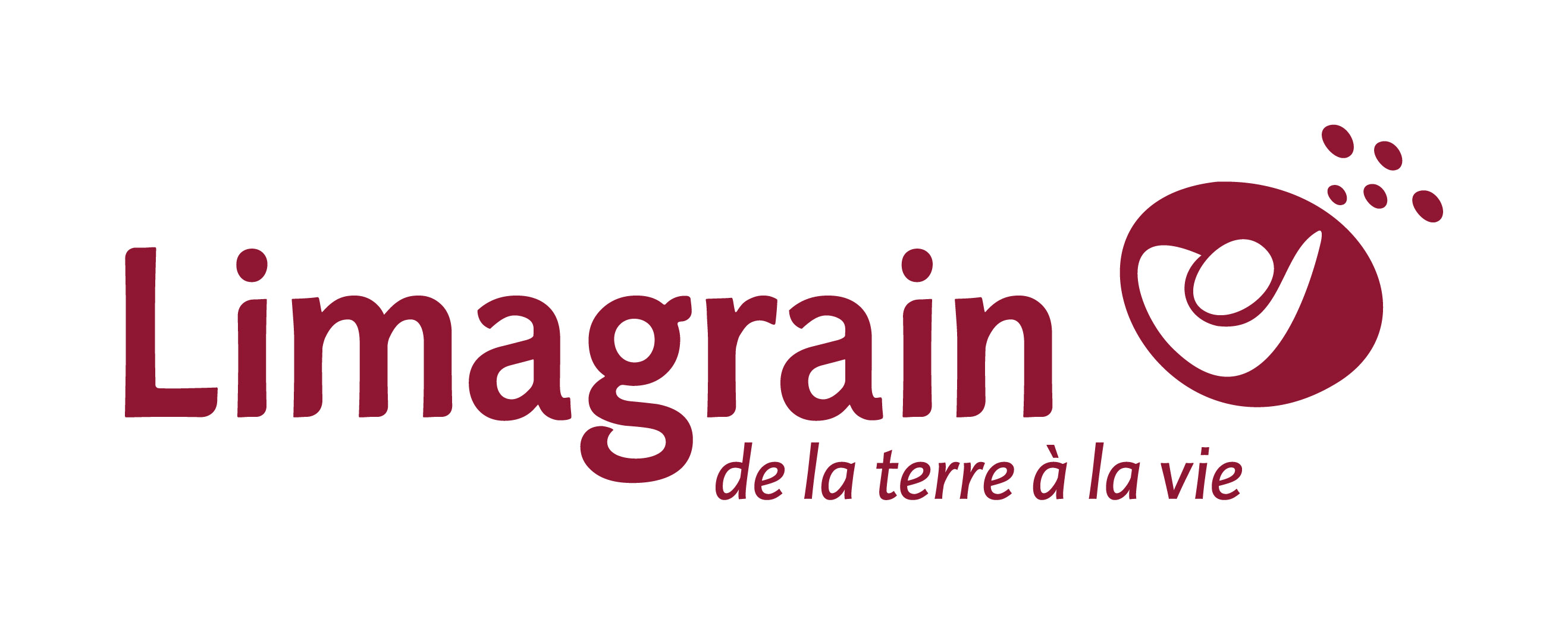
- Type: Non-quoted public company
- Industry: Horticulture
- Founded: 1965
- Headquarters: Saint-Beauzire, Puy-de-Dôme, France
- Area served: Worldwide
- Products: Seeds
- Revenue: more than 2.6 billion euros (2016-2017)
- Net income: 92 million euros (2016-2017)
- Number of employees: more than 10 000
- Website: Groupe Limagrain

Limagrain is an international agricultural co-operative group, specialized in field seeds, vegetable seeds and cereal products. Founded and managed by French farmers, Limagrain is the 3rd largest seed company in the world through its holding Vilmorin & Cie, European leader for functional flours through Limagrain Céréales Ingrédients, 2nd largest French baker and 3rd largest French pastry maker through Jacquet-Brossard.

The Group makes annual sales of more than 2.6 billion Euros and has a headcount of more than 10,000, spread out over 56 countries, including more than 2,000 researchers. In Auvergne the Co-operative has close to 2,000 farmer members. It conducts its business within the framework of a global, sustainable vision of agriculture and agri-food based on innovation and regulation of agricultural markets.

== Core businesses ==
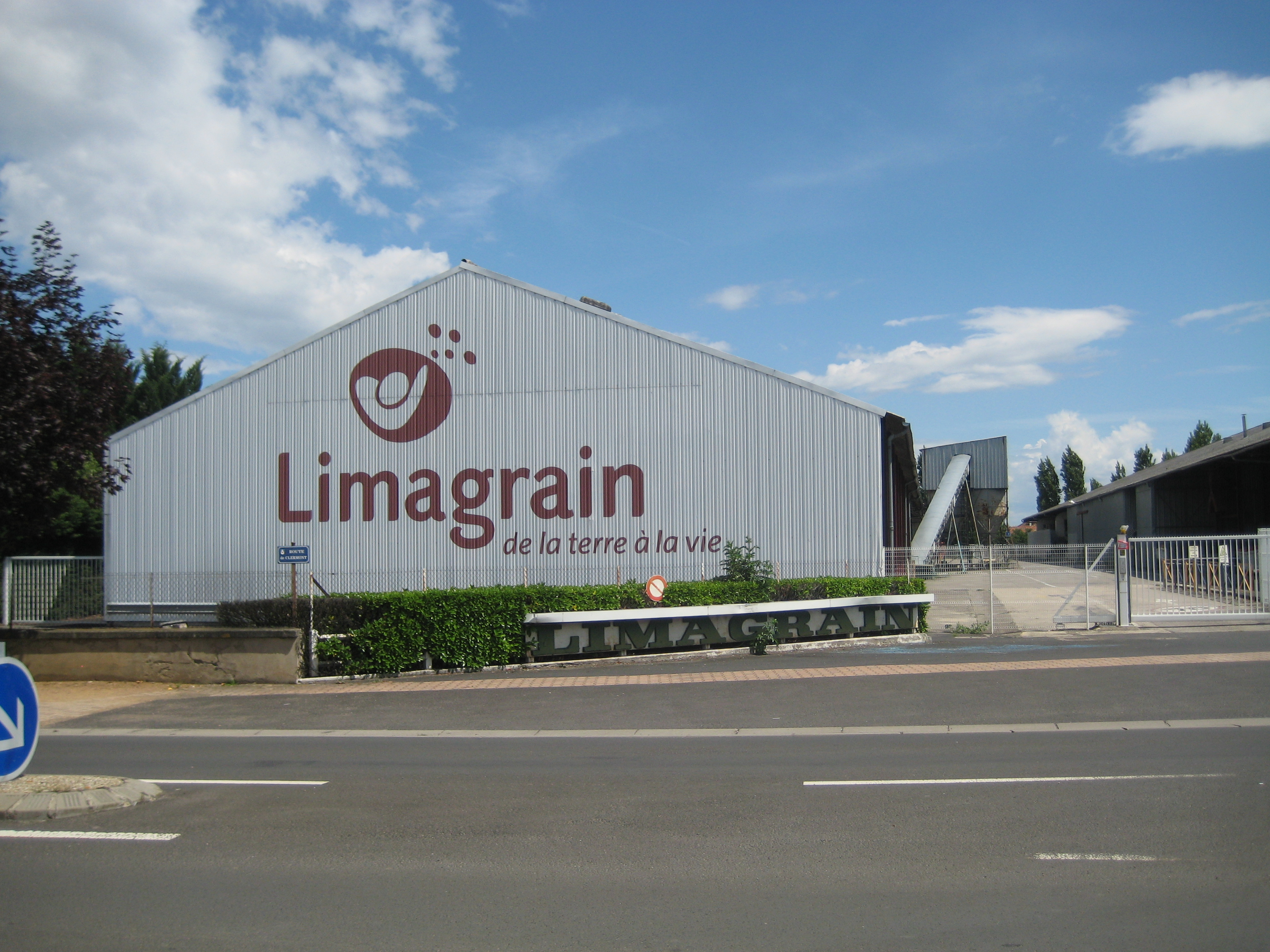
Facility in Chappes, Puy-de-Dôme

- Field Seeds

Field Seeds have always been very much part of Limagrain's historical core business. The Field Seeds activity has been part of Vilmorin & Cie since 2006, and is organized according to two main markets. In Europe, Limagrain Europe is the leading player. In North America, AgReliant, a joint venture with the German seeds company KWS, holds 3rd position on the corn seed market for the United States.

- Vegetable Seeds and Garden Products

Now part of Vilmorin & Cie, the Vegetable Seeds activity has been a major business for Limagrain since 1975. It targets the professional markets of growers and canners. Vilmorin & Cie provides them with vegetable seeds with high added value, and is the second largest company in the world on this market. Dedicated to amateur gardeners, the Garden Products activity proposes seeds of different flower and vegetable varieties, and also bulbs and products for the health and beauty of plants. Vilmorin & Cie is active on the main European gardening markets with a portfolio of well-known brands.

- Bakery and Cereal Ingredients

For Limagrain, the cereal products activity, including cereal ingredients and bakery products, constitutes a fundamental asset for valorizing the agricultural production of its members. Created in 2002, today Limagrain Céréales Ingrédients is a leader in functional flours. With Jacquet, integrated in 1995, Limagrain is the first industrial bakery pastry in France.

== Key figures ==
- 2016-2017 turnover : more than 2.6 billion Euros.
- Workforce : more than 10,000 persons in the world.

== See also ==
- Seed
