= Klein Wanzleben =

- Stadtteil of Wanzleben-Börde
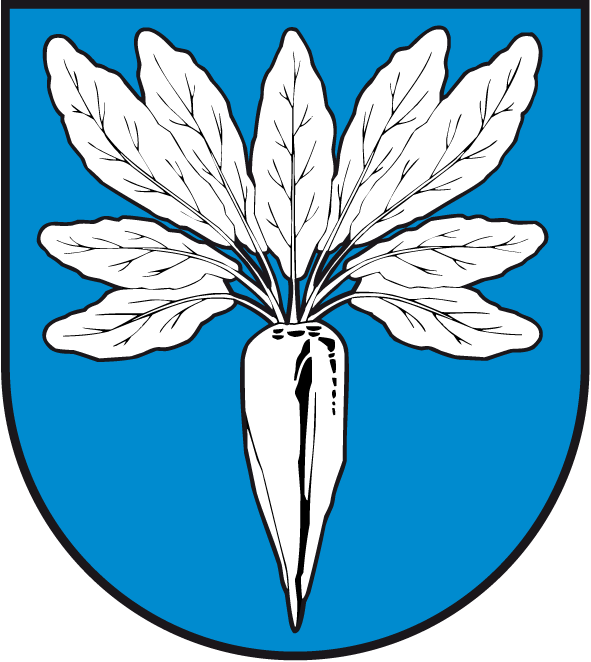
- Coat of arms
- Interactive map of Klein Wanzleben
- Location within Germany Location within Saxony-Anhalt
- Coordinates: 52°4′N 11°22′E
- Country: Germany
- State: Saxony-Anhalt
- District: Börde
- Town: Wanzleben-Börde

Area
  - Total: 24.45 km^{2} (9.44 sq mi)
- Elevation: 113 m (371 ft)

Population (2009-12-31)
  - Total: 2,337
  - Density: 95.58/km^{2} (247.6/sq mi)
- Time zone: UTC+01:00 (CET)
  - Summer (DST): UTC+02:00 (CEST)
- Postal codes: 39164
- Dialling codes: 039209
- Vehicle registration: BK

Klein Wanzleben (German pronunciation: [ˈklaɪn ˈvantsˌleːbn̩], lit. 'Little Wanzleben') is a village and a former municipality in the Börde district in Saxony-Anhalt, Germany.

Since September 1, 2010, it is now part of the town Wanzleben-Börde.
