= Muldestausee-Schmerzbach =

Collective municipality in Saxony-Anhalt, Germany

Coordinates: 51°40′N 12°26′E

Muldestausee-Schmerzbach was a Verwaltungsgemeinschaft ("collective municipality") in the district of Anhalt-Bitterfeld, in Saxony-Anhalt, Germany. It was situated on the right bank of the Mulde, east of Bitterfeld. It was named after the reservoir in the river Mulde in its territory. The seat of the Verwaltungsgemeinschaft was in Schlaitz. It was disbanded on 1 January 2010.

The Verwaltungsgemeinschaft Muldestausee-Schmerzbach consisted of the following municipalities:

1. Burgkemnitz
2. Gossa
3. Gröbern
4. Krina
5. Muldenstein
6. Plodda
7. Pouch
8. Rösa
9. Schlaitz
10. Schwemsal
