= Bitterfeld-Wolfen (Verwaltungsgemeinschaft) =

Coordinates: 51.967°N 12.083°E

Bitterfeld-Wolfen was a Verwaltungsgemeinschaft ("collective municipality") in the Anhalt-Bitterfeld district, in Saxony-Anhalt, Germany. The seat of the Verwaltungsgemeinschaft was in Bitterfeld-Wolfen. It was disbanded on 1 January 2010.

The Verwaltungsgemeinschaft Bitterfeld-Wolfen consisted of the following municipalities:

1. Bitterfeld-Wolfen
2. Friedersdorf
3. Mühlbeck
