= List of Hitler bells =

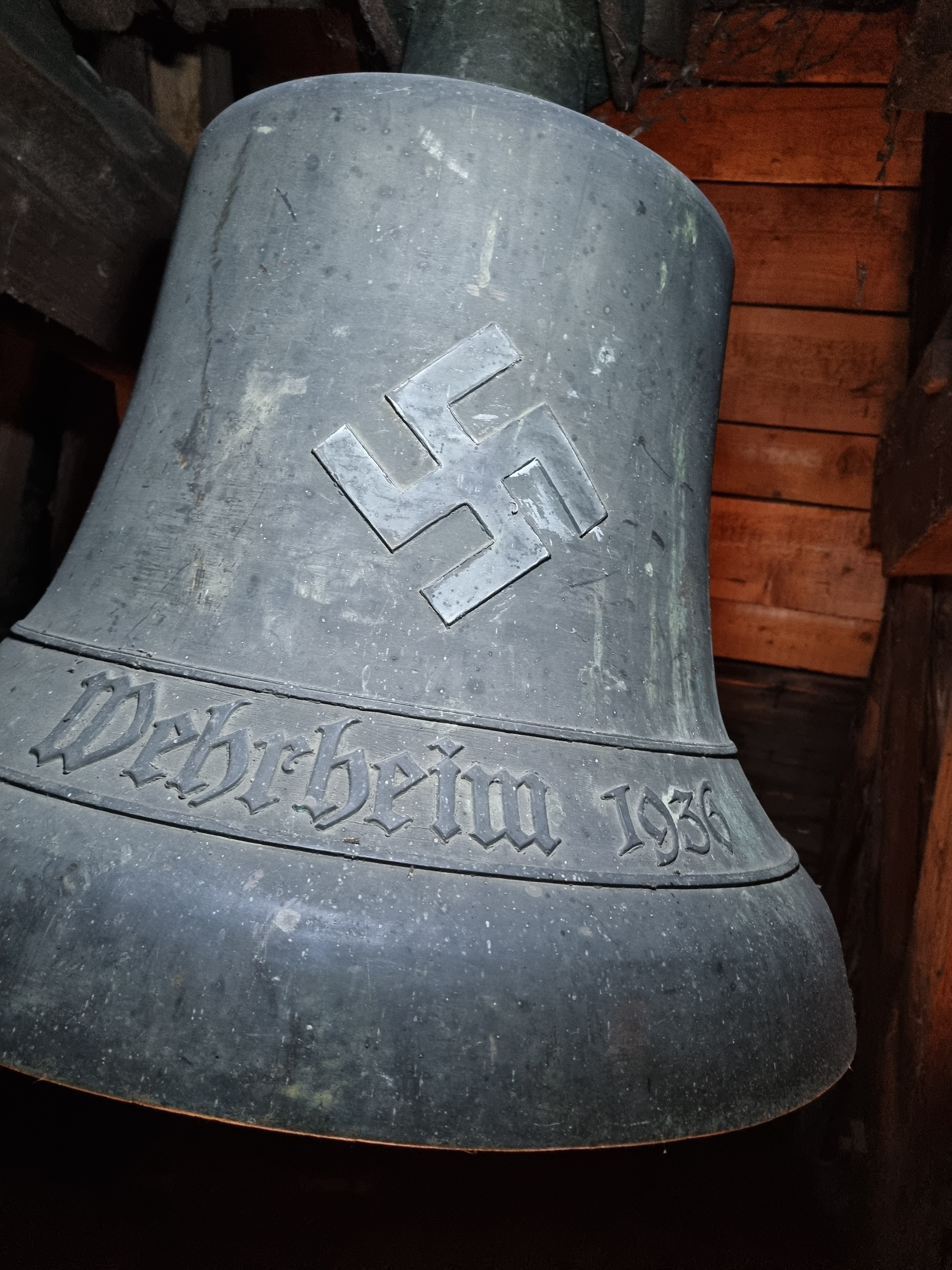
1936 town hall bell from Wehrheim in Hesse

Hitler bell (Hitler-Glocke, Führer-Glocke, Nazi-Glocke) are bells decorated with Nazi ornamentations or texts. The Protestant Church in Germany had 22 such bells in 2020.

== Germany ==
- Essingen, Ostalbkreis, Rheinland-Pfalz
- Faßberg, District of Celle, Niedersachsen; Michaelkirche, Faßberg
- Hakenfelde, Berlin-Spandau; Wichernkirche, Berlin-Hakenfelde
- Herxheim am Berg, District Bad Dürkheim, Rheinland-Pfalz; after a fire in August 1934, the church was sent three replacement bells, one of which was dedicated to Hitler. It bears a swastika and the inscription "ALL FOR THE FATHERLAND - ADOLF HITLER" ("ALLES FUER'S VATERLAND - ADOLF HITLER"). The local council voted to keep it as memorial. The bell was originally non-clerical, an alarm bell (Polizeiglocke).
- Mehlingen, District of Kaiserslautern, Rheinland-Pfalz
- Rilchingen-Hanweiler, Kleinblittersdorf, District of Saarbrücken, Saarland
- Schweringen, District Nienburg/Weser, Niedersachsen; Kreuz-Kirche, Schweringen, a swastika was removed in 2018
- Winzeln, Pirmasens, Rheinland-Pfalz
- Gossa, Muldestausee Anhalt-Bitterfeld Saxony-Anhalt
- Lößnitz, Erzgebirgskreis, Saxony, carillon of 23 bells

== Austria ==
- Vienna, Sieveringer Pfarrkirche, 1938
- Schloss Wolfpassing, Scheibbs District
