= Bitterfeld-Wolfen =

Town in Saxony-Anhalt, Germany

- Town
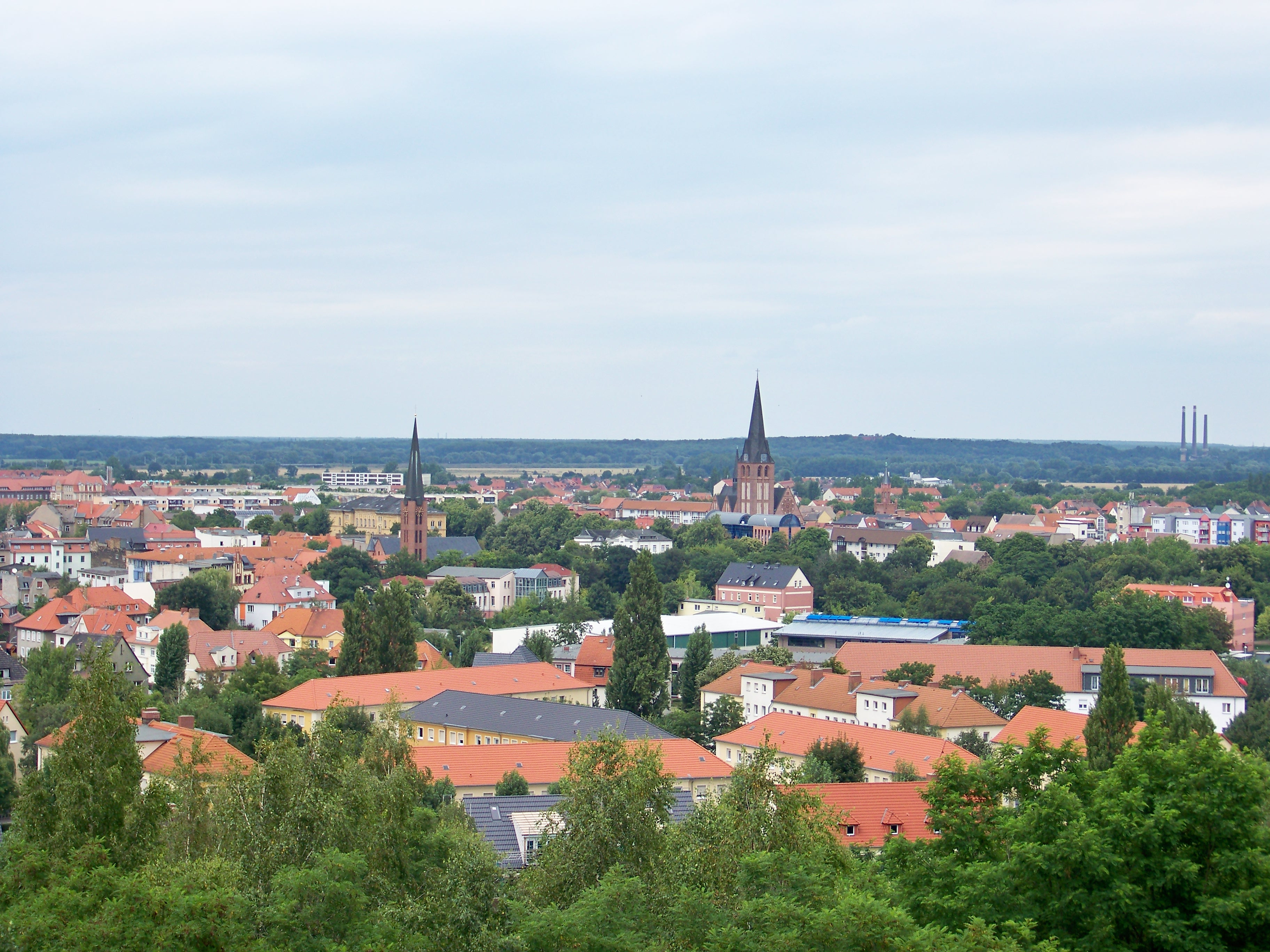
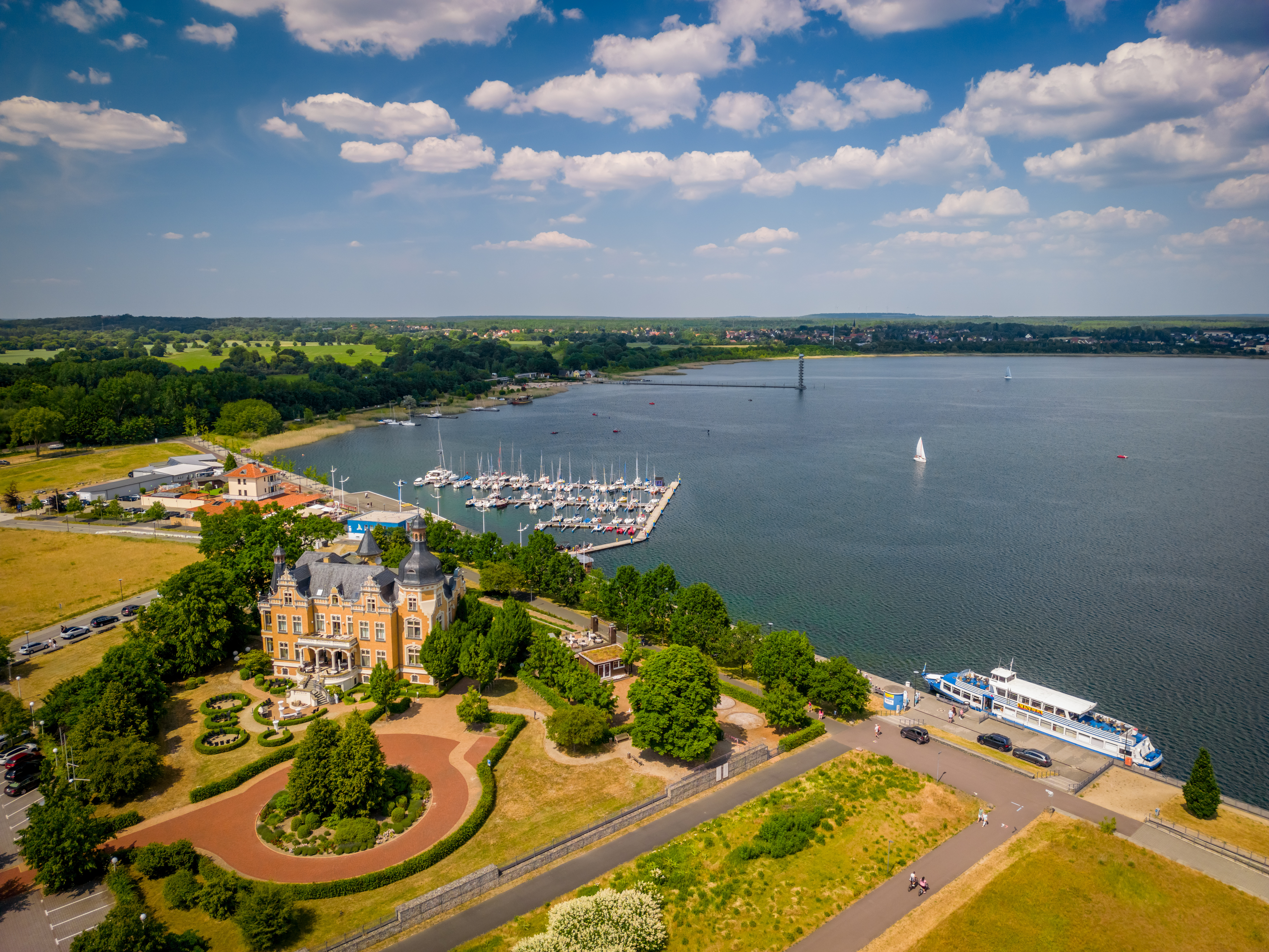
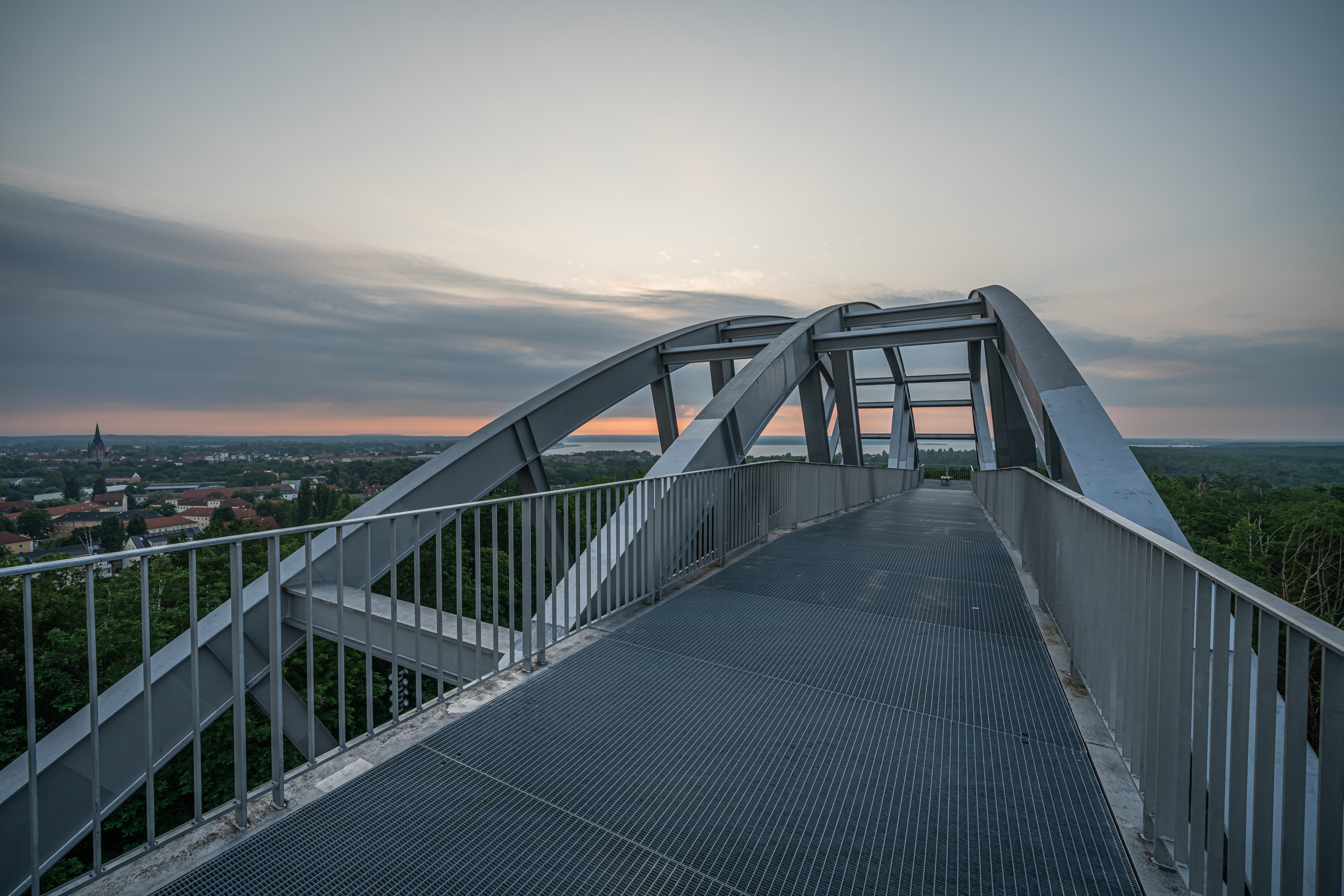
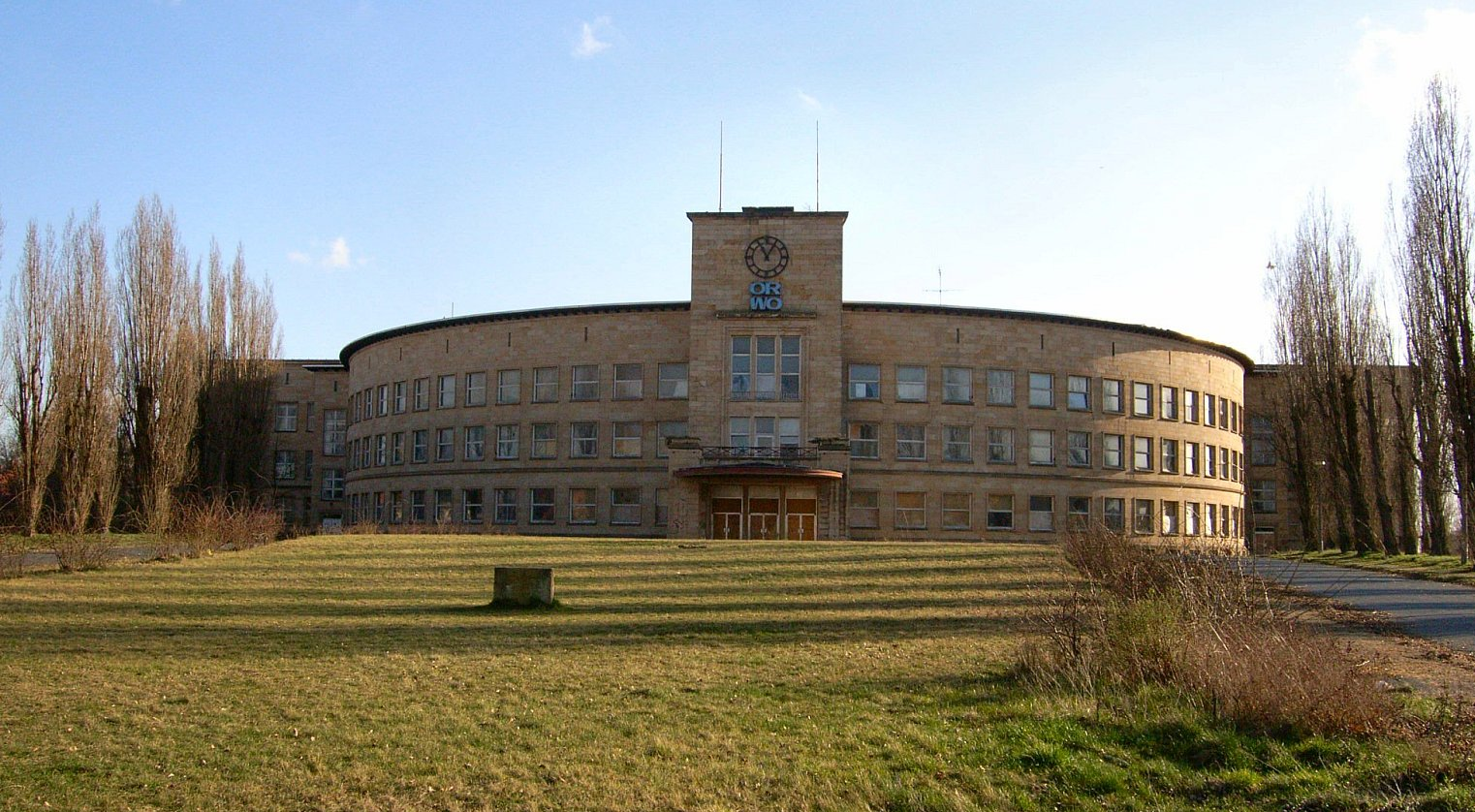
- View over Bitterfeld Großer Goitzschesee Bitterfeld Arch Building 041

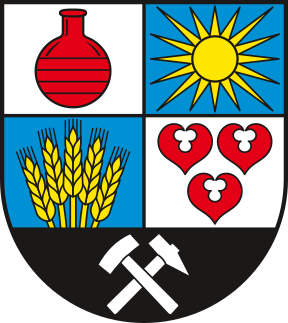
- Coat of arms

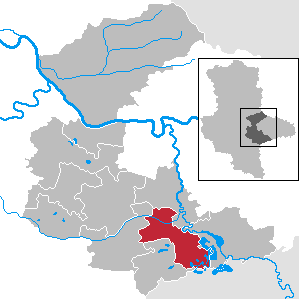
- Location of Bitterfeld-Wolfen within Anhalt-Bitterfeld district
- Interactive map of Bitterfeld-Wolfen
- Location within Germany Location within Saxony-Anhalt
- Coordinates: 51°37′N 12°19′E
- Country: Germany
- State: Saxony-Anhalt
- District: Anhalt-Bitterfeld

Government
  - Mayor (2023–30): Armin Schenk

Area
  - Total: 86.96 km^{2} (33.58 sq mi)
- Elevation: 75–90 m (246–295 ft)

Population (2025-12-31)
  - Total: 36,186
  - Density: 416.1/km^{2} (1,078/sq mi)
- Time zone: UTC+01:00 (CET)
  - Summer (DST): UTC+02:00 (CEST)
- Postal codes: 06731–06749
- Dialling codes: 03493, 03494
- Vehicle registration: ABI
- Website: www.bitterfeld-wolfen.de

Bitterfeld-Wolfen (German pronunciation: [ˈbɪtɐfɛltˌvɔlfn̩]) is a town in the district of Anhalt-Bitterfeld, Saxony-Anhalt, Germany. It is situated in south-eastern Saxony-Anhalt, west of the river Mulde, in an area dominated by heavy industry and lignite mining. The town was formed by merger of the towns of Bitterfeld and Wolfen and the municipalities of Greppin, Holzweißig and Thalheim on 1 July 2007.

== Geography ==
Bitterfeld-Wolfen is 25 kilometres (16 mi) northeast of Halle (Saale) and about 35 kilometres (22 mi) north of Leipzig. Eastward lies the Muldestausee lake, southward the Goitzsche lake with docks and westwards the lido of Sandersdorf. The town lies in a nature reserve, Bitterfelder Bergbaurevier.

=== Neighbouring municipalities ===
Adjoining municipalities are from the north and clockwise Raguhn-Jeßnitz, Muldestausee, Delitzsch, Sandersdorf-Brehna and Zörbig.

=== Climate ===
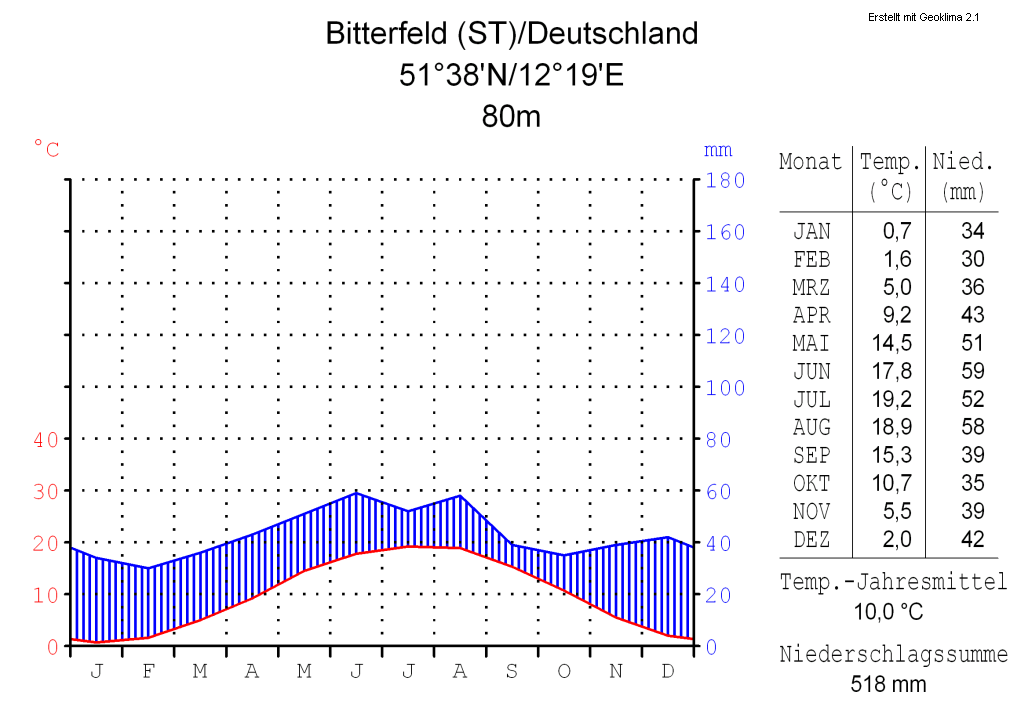
Climate diagram of Bitterfeld

The average air temperature in Bitterfeld is 10.0 °C (50.0 °F) and the yearly rainfall 518 millimetres (20.4 in).

== History ==
=== Town fusion ===
On 1 July 2007 the independent towns of Wolfen and Bitterfeld and the municipalities of Greppin, Thalheim and Holzweißig were merged to form the present-day town of Bitterfeld-Wolfen. Bobbau was absorbed in September 2009.

=== Historical Population ===
(of the present-day town)

Year/Date	Inhabitants
1964 ¹	74,747
1971 ¹	74,369
1981 ¹	73,719
31 December 1985	75,274
31 December 1989	76,147
3 October 1990	72,218
31 December 1990	71,916
31 December 1995	67,060

Date	Inhabitants
31 December 2000	57,435
31 December 2001	55,200
31 December 2002	53,457
31 December 2003	52,013
31 December 2004	50,779
31 December 2005	49,899
31 December 2006	49,030
31 December 2007	47,928
31 December 2008	46,971
31 December 2009	45,968

Date	Inhabitants
31 December 2010	45,171
31 December 2011 ²	42,800
31 December 2014 ³	41,793

¹ Census results
² 2011 Census
³ Source: Bitterfeld-Wolfen Town Hall

Source: Statistisches Landesamt Sachsen-Anhalt

== Bitterfeld ==
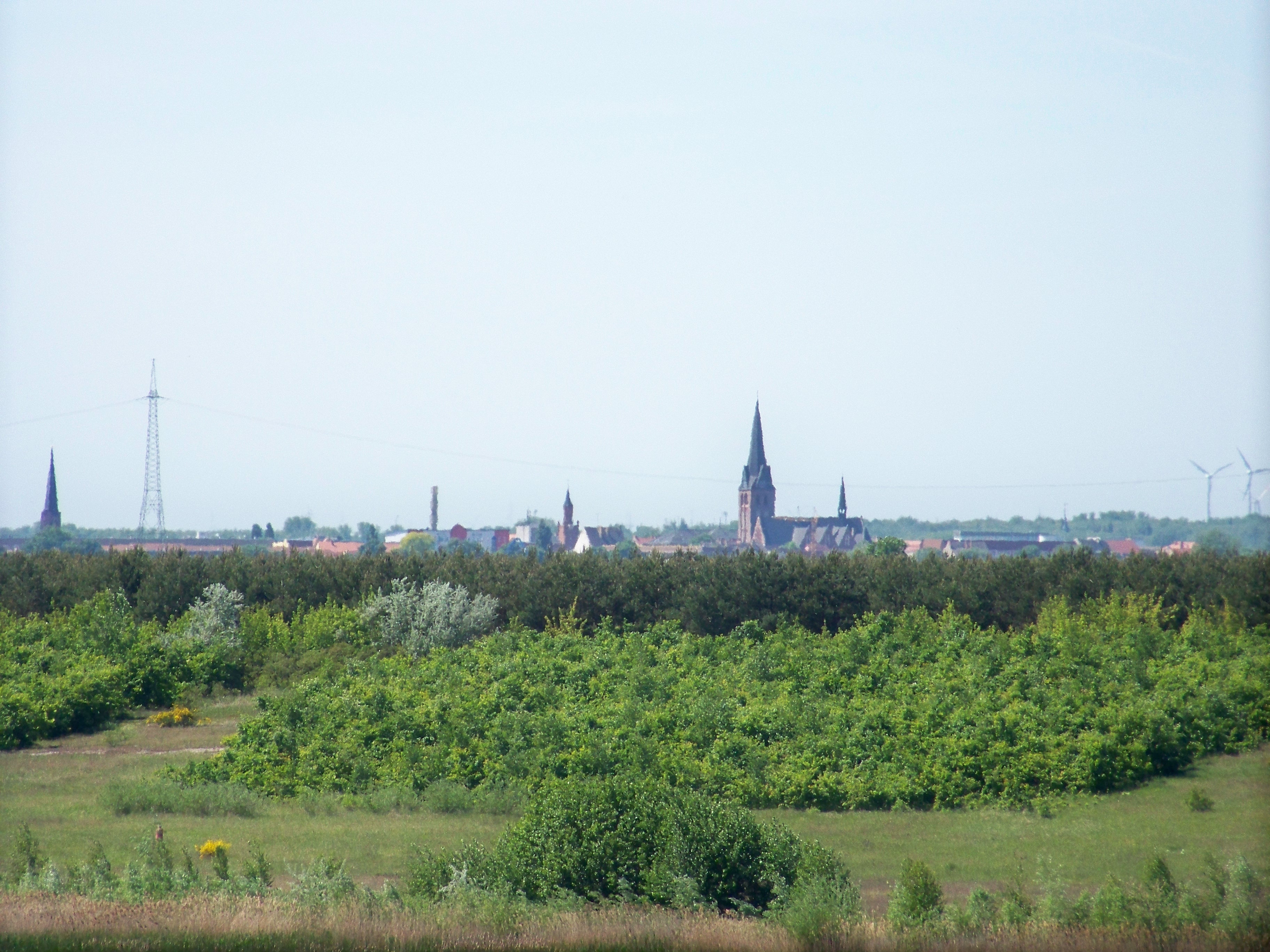
The town seen from Pouch

Bitterfeld has approximately 15,000 inhabitants (2006). It was first documented in 1224. Part of the Electorate of Saxony, it came to the Prussian Province of Saxony in 1815. Until the administrative reform of 2007 it was the capital of the district of Bitterfeld.

== Wolfen ==
Wolfen has approximately 24,000 inhabitants (2006). It is located north of Bitterfeld. Wolfen was first documented around 1400. The discovery of lignite in 1846 and the construction of an Agfa dye factory in 1895 brought industry and population growth.

== Twin towns – sister cities ==
Bitterfeld-Wolfen is twinned with:

- Vierzon, France (1959)
- Villefontaine, France (1990)
- Witten, Germany (1994)
- Dzerzhinsk, Russia (1996)
- Kamienna Góra, Poland (2006)
- Marl, Germany (2007)

== See also ==
- Bitterfeld-Wolfen (Verwaltungsgemeinschaft)
