= Splash! (festival) =

Hip hop and reggae festival in Germany

Coordinates: 50°50′13″N 12°48′51″E

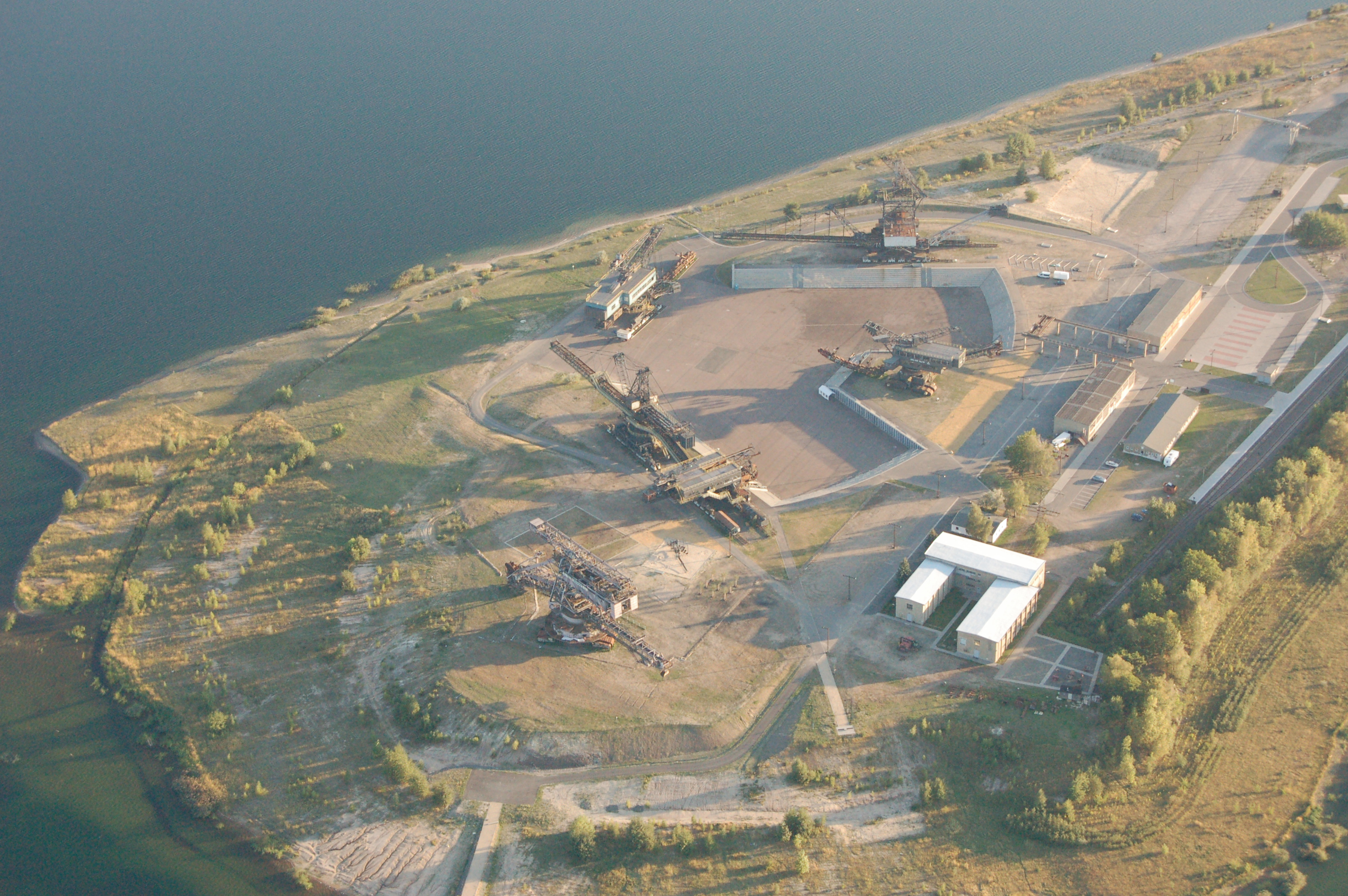
- The former coal mining site Ferropolis seen from above, the site of the Splash! festival
- Genre: Hip hop, reggae, dancehall, drum and bass
- Dates: 3 days (first weekend in July)
- Locations: Ferropolis, Germany
- Years active: 1998–present
- Website: splash-festival.com

Splash! is one of Europe's biggest hip hop and reggae festivals. It first took place in 1998, in the inner city of Chemnitz, Germany. The next year, the location of the festival changed to the Oberrabenstein reservoir near the city, where it remained through 2006. In 2007 and 2008, the festival was held on the Pouch peninsula in Bitterfeld. In 2009, the festival moved to the Ferropolis in Gräfenhainichen, which remains the official site.

In the early years, there were two stages; one each for hip-hop and reggae. In 2006, the festival extended to six stages and four party tents. In addition to hip-hop and drum and bass DJs, the tents also house dancehall and reggae sound systems, a graffiti contest and ITF matches.

The name "Splash" hints at both the waterside location, and the phrase "to make a splash".

== History ==
The Splash! logo

- 1998: The first Splash! was held, not as an open-air festival as originally planned, but in a former powerhouse in the inner city of Chemnitz. It was relatively small (and could be more accurately described as a jam) and counted only 1,300 visitors and six performers, among who were Afrob and KC da Rookee.
- 1999 & 2000: Being held hillside on the Oberrabenstein reservoir, the 1999 festival attracted 13,000 fans, and in 2000, the festival had 20,000 visitors.
- 2001: More than 30,000 tickets were sold in 2001, and the organizer limited the quantity of tickets for sale to 25,000 for the next few years, in order to stay true to the basic idea of the festival—party in a relaxing atmosphere and a high-quality lineup.
- 2005 & 2006: Heavy rain led to declining visitor numbers, causing severe financial losses.
- 2007: Donations helped to balance the losses of about 70% of 2006, and the festival organisation announced on 11 January 2007 that the festival will take place, not in Chemnitz but on the Pouch peninsula in Bitterfeld.
- 2008: Again hosted on the Pouch peninsula, performing acts for the 2008 festival included Jay-Z, Ice Cube, and Saigon.
- 2020: The Splash! Festival was canceled due to the COVID-19 pandemic.
- The 23rd Splash! Festival is scheduled for 8–10 July and 15-17 July 2021. In July 2020, it was announced headlining acts would include ASAP Rocky, ASAP Ferg, and Haftbefehl.
- 2025: Splash! Festival was presented by Deutsche Telekom and featuring headlining performances by Doechii, Ken Carson, Young Thug, Yeat and more.

== Financial crisis ==
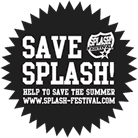
"Save Splash!" button

The meeting of creditors in the insolvency proceedings was held on 9 January 2007. According to a Chemnitz newspaper, the debt amounted to over €500,000. The Splash! Entertainment AG asked for public help to be able to celebrate the 10th anniversary of the festival, an account for donations was opened additionally to a charity concert that had already taken place in November 2006, altogether reaching €325,000.

After obtaining €350,000 through donations from both fans and artists like Jan Delay, Samy Deluxe or the Dresden Philharmonic orchestra, the organizers announced that the festival would be held, and also informed the public about the new location.
