= Bitterfeld Arch =

Lookout point in the form of a steel arch bridge

Coordinates: 51°36′55″N 12°19′34″E

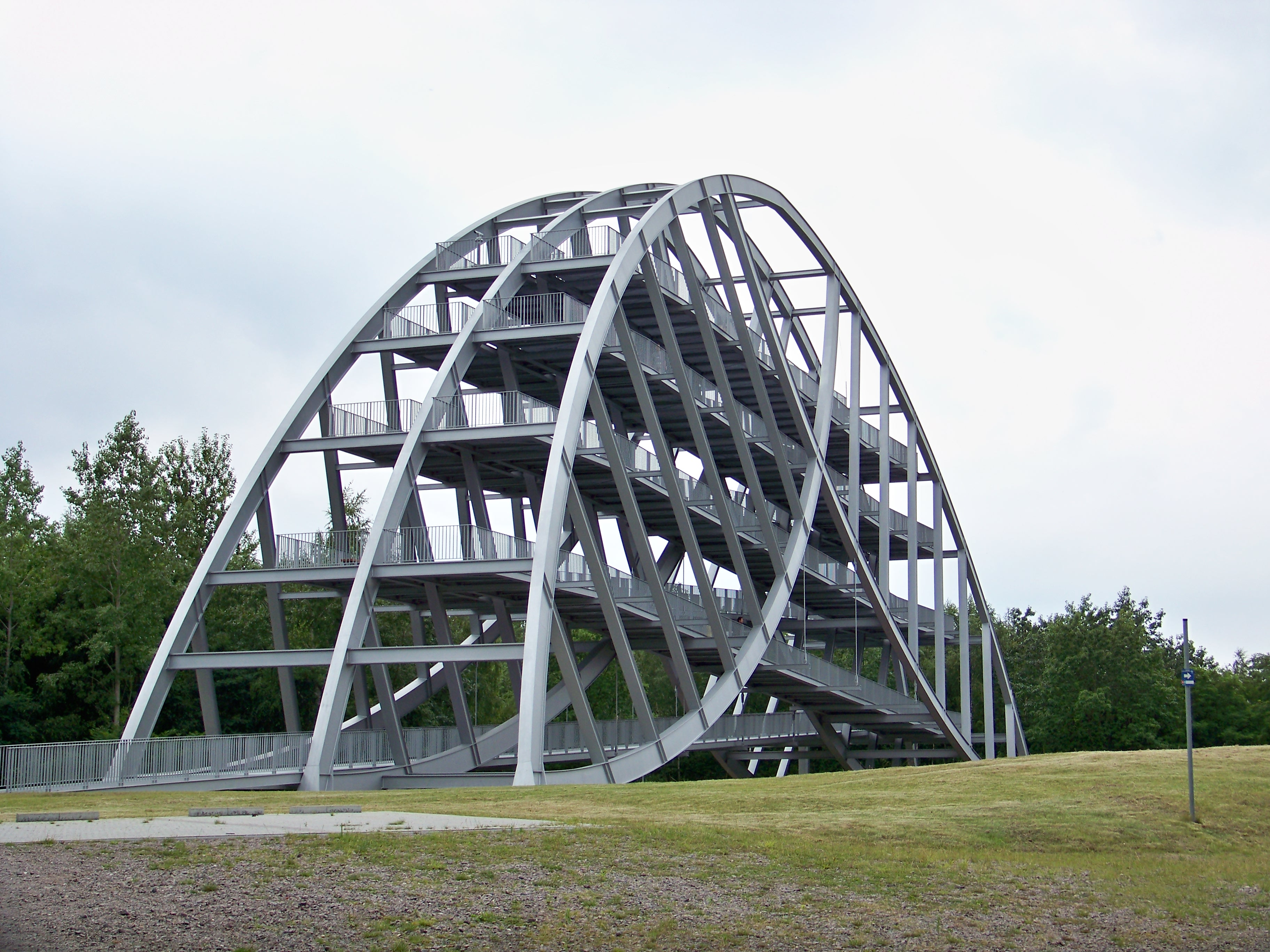
Bitterfeld Arch

The Bitterfeld Arch (German: Bitterfeld Bogen) is a structure in the form of a steel arch in Bitterfeld-Wolfen that is now a landmark of the city.

It is an architectural sculpture designed by the Frankfurt artist Claus Bury and situated on the Bitterfelder Berg an ancient sand dune. It sits above the newly created park and lake landscape of the Bitterfeld region that have been built over the remains of brown coal open pit mines. It is meant to symbolize not only the region's renewal after its departure from heavy industry, but also the unity of the city which was created by the merger of the towns Bitterfeld and Wolfen and the municipalities Greppin, Holzweißig and Thalheim on 1 July 2007.

A viewing platform that provides a panoramic view of Bitterfeld, and the surrounding region can be found at the top. The Bitterfeld Arch appears in Bitterfeld-Wolfen's city logo.

== Construction ==
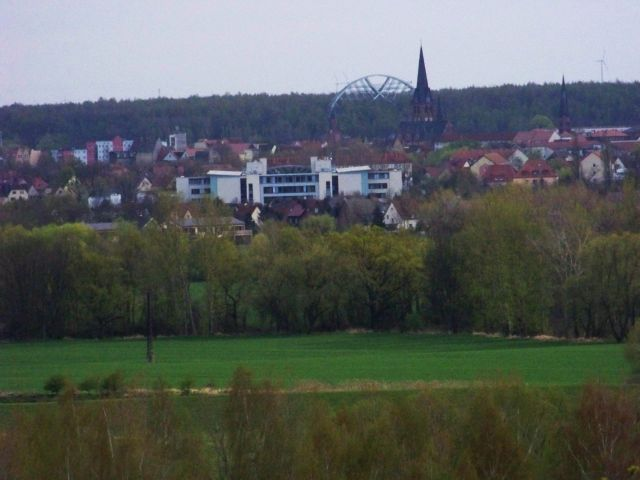
Bitterfeld and the Bitterfelder Arch, taken from Steinberg in Muldenstein.

Construction started in 2005 and was completed in 2006. It is 81 m long, 14 m wide at the base, and 28 m high.

The two side arches lean toward the center arch, to provide overall support for the structure, and thus the structure is narrower at the top. Each of the three arches consists of two diagonally opposed, pointed-oval wing shapes, with eight perpendicular struts spanning them.

Between the arches there is a continuous ramp from the ground to the top. It runs straight from one side to the other, in eight segments, connected at the ends by small platform with a bench. The total length of the ramps is 540 m. The ramps are floored with non-slip and close-meshed galvanized steel grates. All ramps are stepless, and have by metal railings with narrow evenly spaced balusters for safety.

== Environmental report ==
Bitterfelder Bogen is also the title of an environmental report by Monika Maron published in 2009. In 1981, in her debut novel "Fly Ash", she described Bitterfeld as Europe's most polluted city. Nearly 30 years later, in this report, she describes the changes in the city and reports especially about the newly created Q-Cells solar cell factory.
