= Gossa =

Gossa may refer to:

== Places ==
- Gossa (island), an island in Møre og Romsdal county, Norway
- Gossa, Germany, a former municipality in Saxony-Anhalt, Germany

== See also ==
- Gossas, a town in Fatick Region in western Senegal
- Hossa (disambiguation)
