= United Metal Maniacs =

- Genre: Extreme metal
- Dates: May
- Locations: Bitterfeld, Germany
- Years active: 2003 – present
- Website: united-metal-maniacs.de

United Metal Maniacs is an extreme metal festival held annually since 2003 in Bitterfeld, Germany.

== Lineups ==
=== 2006 ===
- June 3–4, 2006: Decayed, Desaster, Deströyer 666, Dekapitator, Helrunar, Infernal War, Mental Horror, Nebular Mystic, Primordial, Secrets of the Moon, Warhammer.

=== 2007 ===
- May 26–27, 2007: Adorior, Anael, Archgoat, Black Witchery, Bullet, Delirium Tremens, Denial of God, Razor of Occam, Unpure.

=== 2008 ===
- May 10–11, 2008: Angelcorpse, Arkhon Infaustus, Barbatos, Code, Dissimulation, Enforcer, Enslaved, Flesh Made Sin, Nifelheim, Purgatory, Ravencult, Revenge, Root, Sólstafir, Svartahrid, Tyrant, The Battalion, Witchmaster.

=== 2010 ===
- May 22–23, 2010: Trident, The Stone, Vomitor, Gospel of the Horns, Gehenna, Tulus, Baphomet's Blood, Die Hard, Sahg, Affliction Gate, Nachtmystium, Ketzer, Nocturnal, Negura Bunget, Kill, The Jailbreakers
