= Bitterfeld (district) =

Coordinates: 51°40′N 12°20′E

- District
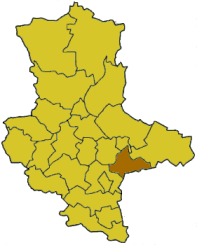
- Country: Germany
- State: Saxony-Anhalt
- Disbanded: 2007-07-01
- Capital: Bitterfeld

Area
  - Total: 505 km^{2} (195 sq mi)

Population (2001)
  - Total: 109,300
  - Density: 220/km^{2} (560/sq mi)
- Time zone: UTC+01:00 (CET)
  - Summer (DST): UTC+02:00 (CEST)
- Vehicle registration: BTF
- Website: landkreis-bitterfeld.mda.de

Bitterfeld was a district in Saxony-Anhalt, Germany. It was bounded by (from the north and clockwise) the city of Dessau, the district of Wittenberg, Delitzsch (Saxony) and the districts of Saalkreis and Köthen.

== History ==
The district was a swampy and unpopulated area in the early Middle Ages. In the 12th century Flemish settlers helped to drain the swamps. In that time Bitterfeld was known as "the Flemish town" in the region. The present district is roughly identical with the old county of Brehna, which ruled the area from the 10th to the 13th century. Later the region became a part of Saxony.

When Prussia gained the northern parts of Saxony (including the lands around Bitterfeld), the district of Bitterfeld was established. After the dissolution of Anhalt some places in the north were added to the district.

The East German government tried to establish a socialistic industrial centre in the Bitterfeld region. The city of Bitterfeld and the entire district were infamous for polluted air, poisoned rivers and devastated landscape. After the German reunification there have been measures to change these conditions. Today the power plants work with modern filters, and sewage works greatly improve the water conditions.

During the Kreisreform 2007 the district was merged with Köthen and a large part of Anhalt-Zerbst into the new district Anhalt-Bitterfeld.

== Geography ==
The Mulde River crossed the district from south to north.

== Coat of arms ==
The coat of arms displays:
- top left and bottom right: the arms of the medieval county of Brehna
- top right: the heraldic lion of Saxony
- bottom left: the arms of the county of Landsberg

== Towns and municipalities ==
Towns
1. Zörbig
Verwaltungsgemeinschaften
1. Bitterfeld (incl. towns Bitterfeld and Brehna)
2. Muldestausee-Schmerzbach
3. Raguhn (incl. towns Jeßnitz and Raguhn)
4. Wolfen (incl. town Wolfen)
Free municipalities
1. Sandersdorf
