= St. Jacob's Church, Herxheim am Berg =

Protestant church in Herxheim am Berg

Coordinates: 49°30′35″N 8°10′55″E

St. Jacob's Church (St.-Jakob-Kirche) is a Protestant parish church in Herxheim am Berg, Rhineland-Palatinate. The church and its cemetery are protected by the General Directorate for Cultural Heritage Rhineland-Palatinate.

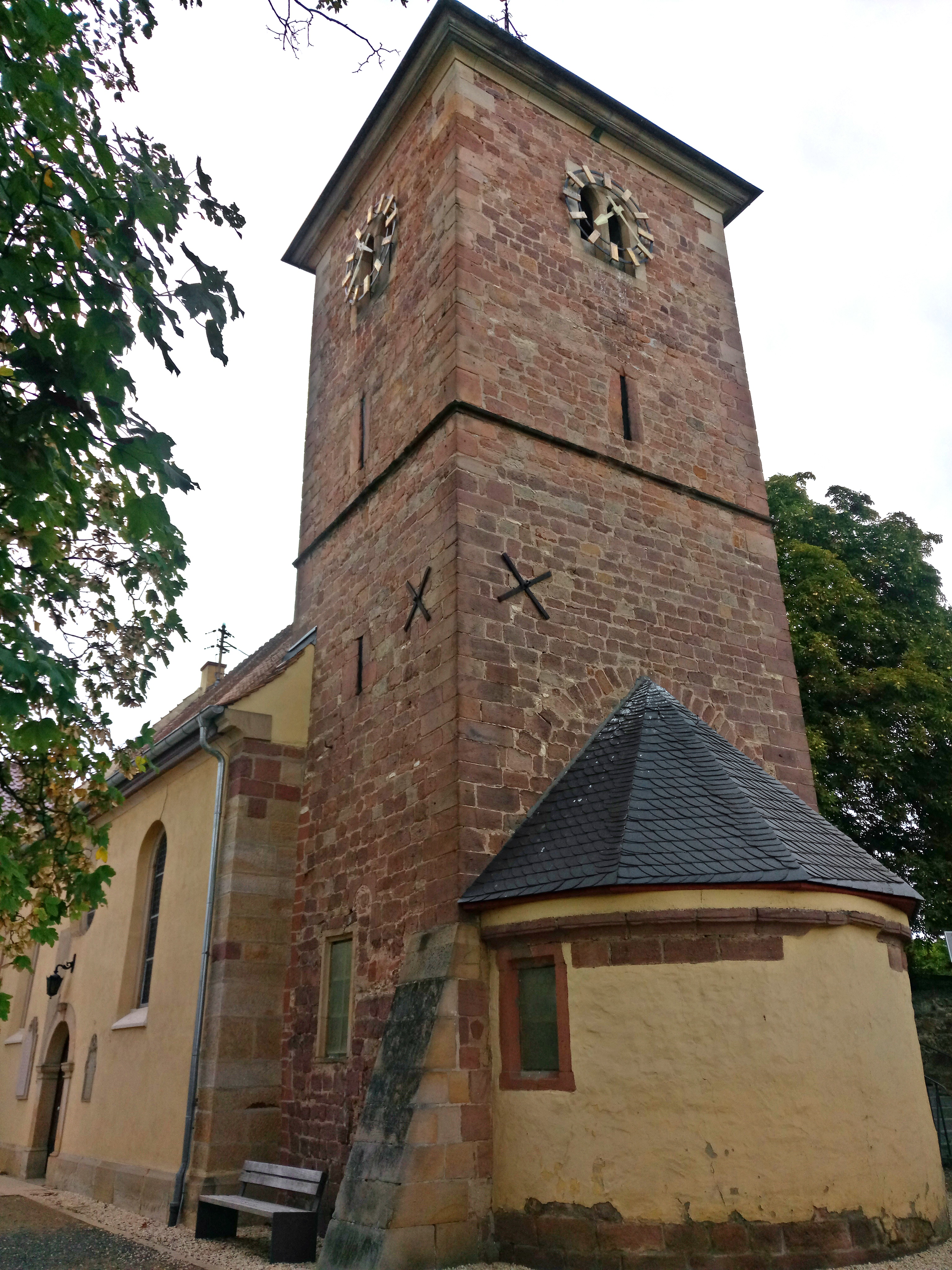

== The building ==
The building contains the lower section of a quire tower with a groin-vaulted chancel onto which is built a semicircular apse. The church was built about 1014. The nave dates to 1729. In the chancel, wall paintings have been brought to light showing the Four Evangelists, both in human shape with wings and with the heads of their symbols. In the apse's vaulting there was a representation of the Last Judgement, and on the south wall, one can see the Apostle Paul. The paintings were done in the latter half of the 14th century.

== Bells ==
A local teacher set fire to the church in August 1934. The church, the tower and the bells were destroyed. Three new bells came in December 1934. The church was reconstructed in 1935.

One of those three bells was dedicated to Adolf Hitler, a Hitler bell, bearing a swastika and the inscription "ALL FOR THE FATHERLAND - ADOLF HITLER" ("ALLES FUER'S VATERLAND - ADOLF HITLER"). The local council voted to keep it as memorial.

The bell was originally non-clerical, an alarm bell (Polizeiglocke).
