= Hossa =

Hossa may refer to:

== People ==
- František Hossa (born 1954), Slovak ice hockey player
- Marián Hossa (born 1979), Slovak ice hockey player
- Marcel Hossa (born 1981), Slovak ice hockey player

== Places ==
- Hossa (Finland), a village in the Suomussalmi municipality, Oulu province, Finland

== See also ==
- Gossa (disambiguation)
