= Schwemsal =

- Ortsteil of Muldestausee
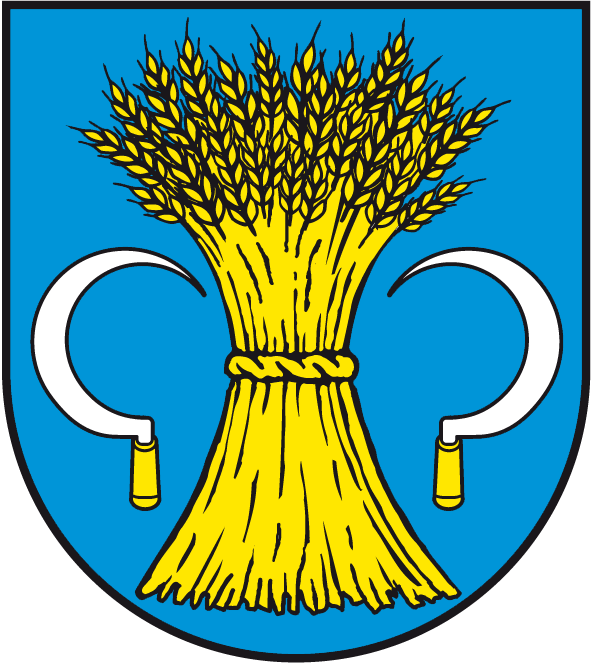
- Coat of arms
- Interactive map of Schwemsal
- Location within Germany Location within Saxony-Anhalt
- Coordinates: 51°38′N 12°34′E
- Country: Germany
- State: Saxony-Anhalt
- District: Anhalt-Bitterfeld
- Municipality: Muldestausee

Area
  - Total: 17.13 km^{2} (6.61 sq mi)
- Elevation: 110 m (360 ft)

Population (2006-12-31)
  - Total: 663
  - Density: 38.7/km^{2} (100/sq mi)
- Time zone: UTC+01:00 (CET)
  - Summer (DST): UTC+02:00 (CEST)
- Postal codes: 06774
- Dialling codes: 034243

Schwemsal (German pronunciation: [ˈʃvɛmzaːl]) is a village and a former municipality in the district of Anhalt-Bitterfeld, in Saxony-Anhalt, Germany. Since 1 January 2010, it is part of the municipality Muldestausee.
