= Krina =

- Ortsteil of Muldestausee
- Coat of arms
- Interactive map of Krina
- Location within Germany Location within Saxony-Anhalt
- Coordinates: 51°39′N 12°29′E
- Country: Germany
- State: Saxony-Anhalt
- District: Anhalt-Bitterfeld
- Municipality: Muldestausee

Area
  - Total: 14.97 km^{2} (5.78 sq mi)
- Elevation: 103 m (338 ft)

Population (2006-12-31)
  - Total: 718
  - Density: 48.0/km^{2} (124/sq mi)
- Time zone: UTC+01:00 (CET)
  - Summer (DST): UTC+02:00 (CEST)
- Postal codes: 06774
- Dialling codes: 034955

Krina (German pronunciation: [ˈkʁiːna]) is a village and a former municipality in the district of Anhalt-Bitterfeld, in Saxony-Anhalt, Germany. It is part of the Muldestause community of the Anhalt-Bitterfeld district. The population is 718 (as of December 31, 2006). It covers an area of 14.97 square kilometers.

== History ==
It was first mentioned in 1530.

From 25 July 1952 to 2 October 1990, Krina was part of the Halle district of East Germany.

The village's coat of arms was designed by the Magdeburg Municipal heraldicist Joerg Mantz in 1996.

Previously, Krina had the status of a community (commune), divided into 2 rural districts. On January 1, 2010, it became part of the community of Muldestauze. The last burgomaster of the community of Krin was Bernd Fribel.
