= Burgkemnitz =

- Ortsteil of Muldestausee
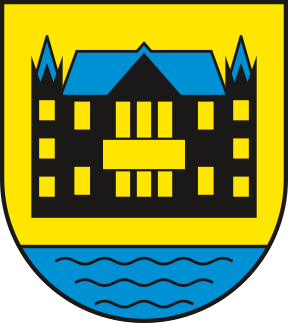
- Coat of arms
- Interactive map of Burgkemnitz
- Location within Germany Location within Saxony-Anhalt
- Coordinates: 51°41′N 12°24′E
- Country: Germany
- State: Saxony-Anhalt
- District: Anhalt-Bitterfeld
- Municipality: Muldestausee

Area
  - Total: 14.77 km^{2} (5.70 sq mi)
- Elevation: 91 m (299 ft)

Population (2006-12-31)
  - Total: 822
  - Density: 55.7/km^{2} (144/sq mi)
- Time zone: UTC+01:00 (CET)
  - Summer (DST): UTC+02:00 (CEST)
- Postal codes: 06804
- Dialling codes: 034955
- Vehicle registration: ABI

Burgkemnitz (German pronunciation: [ˈbʊʁkˌkɛmnɪts]) is a village and a former municipality in the district of Anhalt-Bitterfeld, in Saxony-Anhalt, Germany. Since 1 January 2010, it is part of the municipality Muldestausee.
