= Gröbern =

- Ortsteil of Muldestausee
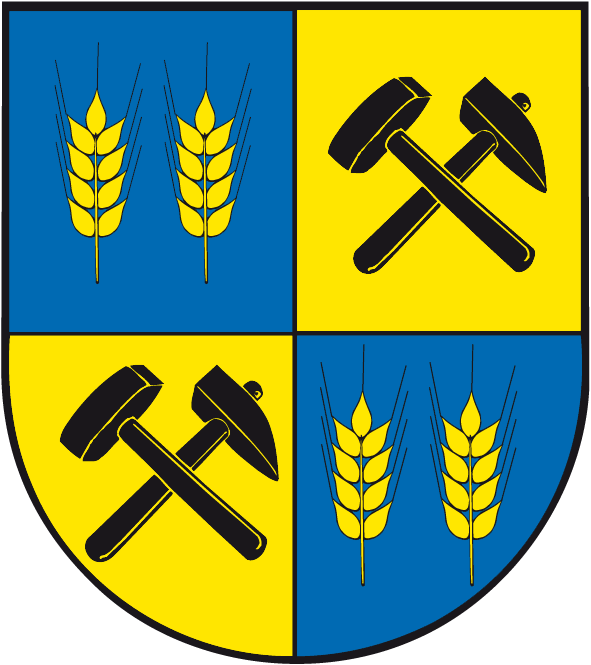
- Coat of arms
- Interactive map of Gröbern
- Location within Germany Location within Saxony-Anhalt
- Coordinates: 51°41′N 12°27′E
- Country: Germany
- State: Saxony-Anhalt
- District: Anhalt-Bitterfeld
- Municipality: Muldestausee

Area
  - Total: 8.45 km^{2} (3.26 sq mi)
- Elevation: 107 m (351 ft)

Population (2006-12-31)
  - Total: 642
  - Density: 76.0/km^{2} (197/sq mi)
- Time zone: UTC+01:00 (CET)
  - Summer (DST): UTC+02:00 (CEST)
- Postal codes: 06773
- Dialling codes: 034955

Gröbern (German pronunciation: [ˈɡʁøːbɐn]) is a village and a former municipality in the district of Anhalt-Bitterfeld, in Saxony-Anhalt, Germany. Since 1 January 2010, it is part of the municipality Muldestausee.
