= Rösa =

- Ortsteil of Muldestausee
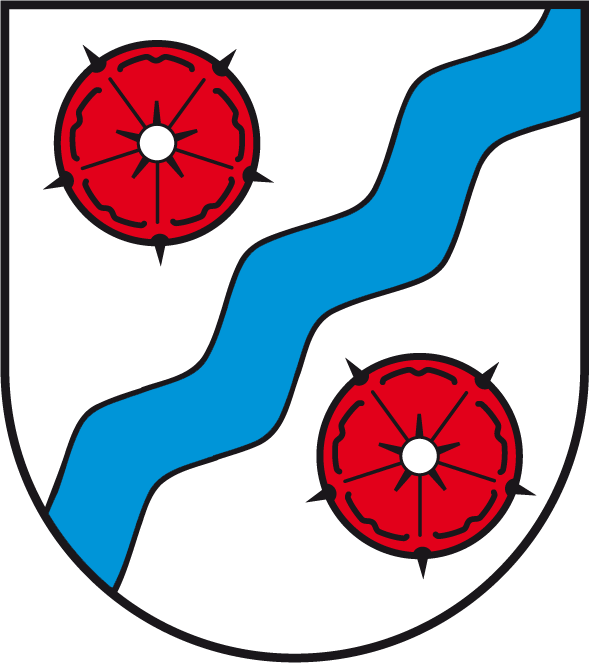
- Coat of arms
- Interactive map of Rösa
- Location within Germany Location within Saxony-Anhalt
- Coordinates: 51°37′N 12°30′E
- Country: Germany
- State: Saxony-Anhalt
- District: Anhalt-Bitterfeld
- Municipality: Muldestausee

Area
  - Total: 21.12 km^{2} (8.15 sq mi)
- Elevation: 84 m (276 ft)

Population (2006-12-31)
  - Total: 916
  - Density: 43.4/km^{2} (112/sq mi)
- Time zone: UTC+01:00 (CET)
  - Summer (DST): UTC+02:00 (CEST)
- Postal codes: 06774
- Dialling codes: 034208
- Vehicle registration: ABI

Rösa (German pronunciation: [ˈʁøːza]) is a village and a former municipality in the district of Anhalt-Bitterfeld, in Saxony-Anhalt, Germany. Since 1 January 2010, it has been part of the municipality Muldestausee.
