= Schlaitz =

- Ortsteil of Muldestausee
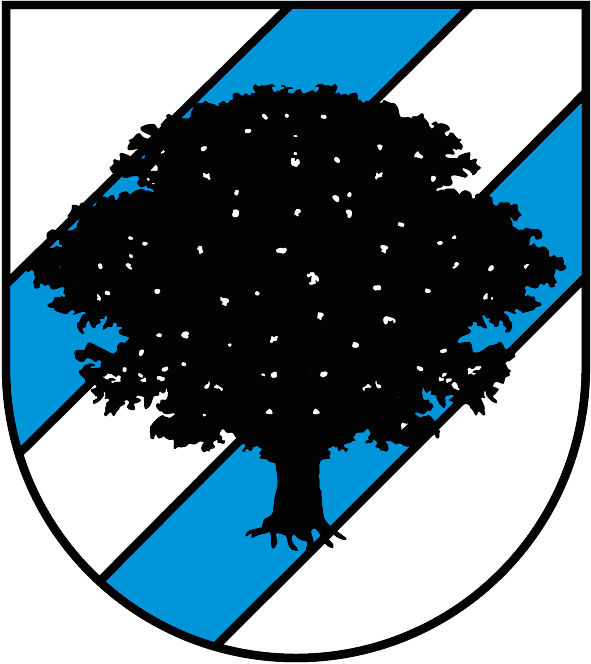
- Coat of arms
- Interactive map of Schlaitz
- Location within Germany Location within Saxony-Anhalt
- Coordinates: 51°40′N 12°26′E
- Country: Germany
- State: Saxony-Anhalt
- District: Anhalt-Bitterfeld
- Municipality: Muldestausee

Area
  - Total: 4.94 km^{2} (1.91 sq mi)
- Elevation: 98 m (322 ft)

Population (2006-12-31)
  - Total: 1,003
  - Density: 203/km^{2} (526/sq mi)
- Time zone: UTC+01:00 (CET)
  - Summer (DST): UTC+02:00 (CEST)
- Postal codes: 06774
- Dialling codes: 034955

Schlaitz (German pronunciation: [ˈʃlaɪts]) is a village and a former municipality in the district of Anhalt-Bitterfeld, in Saxony-Anhalt, Germany. Since 1 January 2010, it is part of the municipality Muldestausee.
