= Mühlbeck =

- Ortsteil of Muldestausee
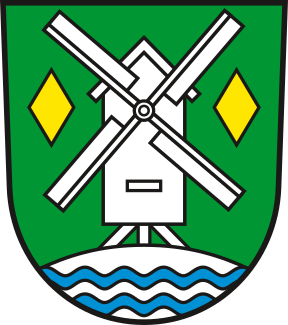
- Coat of arms
- Interactive map of Mühlbeck
- Location within Germany Location within Saxony-Anhalt
- Coordinates: 51°38′N 12°23′E
- Country: Germany
- State: Saxony-Anhalt
- District: Anhalt-Bitterfeld
- Municipality: Muldestausee

Area
  - Total: 4.80 km^{2} (1.85 sq mi)
- Elevation: 79 m (259 ft)

Population (2006-12-31)
  - Total: 950
  - Density: 200/km^{2} (510/sq mi)
- Time zone: UTC+01:00 (CET)
  - Summer (DST): UTC+02:00 (CEST)
- Postal codes: 06774
- Dialling codes: 03493

Mühlbeck (German pronunciation: [ˈmyːlbɛk]) is a village and a former municipality in the district of Anhalt-Bitterfeld, in Saxony-Anhalt, Germany. Since 1 January 2010, it is part of the municipality Muldestausee.
