= Pouch, Germany =

Pouch
- Ortsteil of Muldestausee
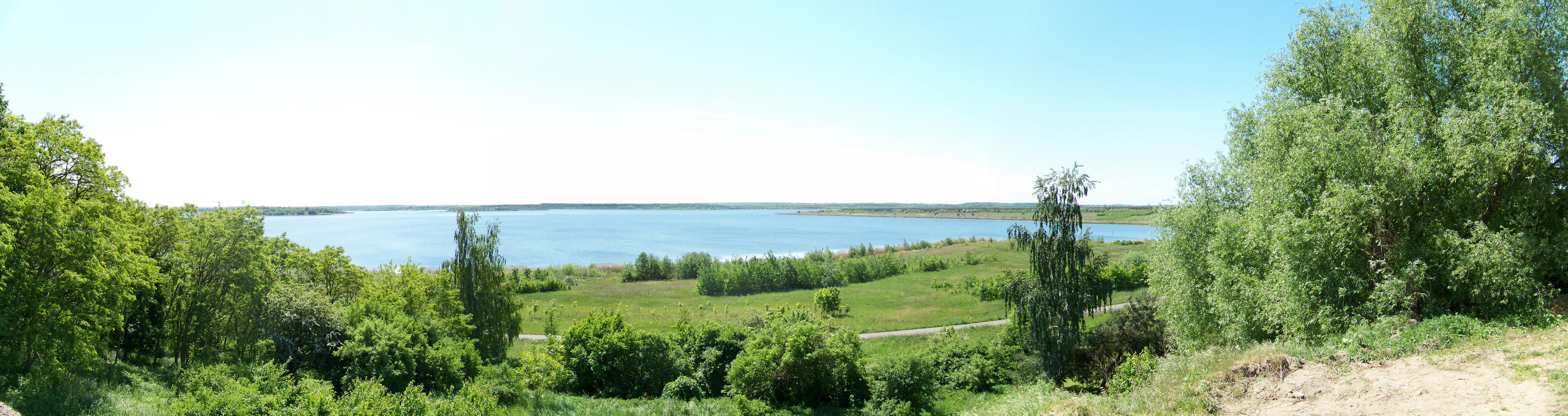
- Lake at Pouch

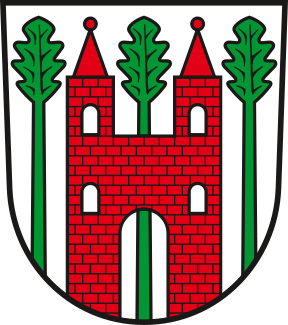
- Coat of arms
- Interactive map of Pouch
- Location within Germany Location within Saxony-Anhalt
- Coordinates: 51°37′20″N 12°24′10″E
- Country: Germany
- State: Saxony-Anhalt
- District: Anhalt-Bitterfeld
- Municipality: Muldestausee

Area
  - Total: 29.70 km^{2} (11.47 sq mi)
- Elevation: 81 m (266 ft)

Population (2006-12-31)
  - Total: 1,702
  - Density: 57.31/km^{2} (148.4/sq mi)
- Time zone: UTC+01:00 (CET)
  - Summer (DST): UTC+02:00 (CEST)
- Postal codes: 06774
- Dialling codes: 03493
- Vehicle registration: ABI

Pouch (German pronunciation: [poːx]) is a village and a former municipality in the district of Anhalt-Bitterfeld, in Saxony-Anhalt, Germany. Since 1 January 2010, it is part of the municipality Muldestausee. It is located at Lake Goitzsche, part of the man-made lakeland Neuseenland, and close to the city of Bitterfeld-Wolfen.

Pouch is known for the annual Sputnik spring break festival in June.

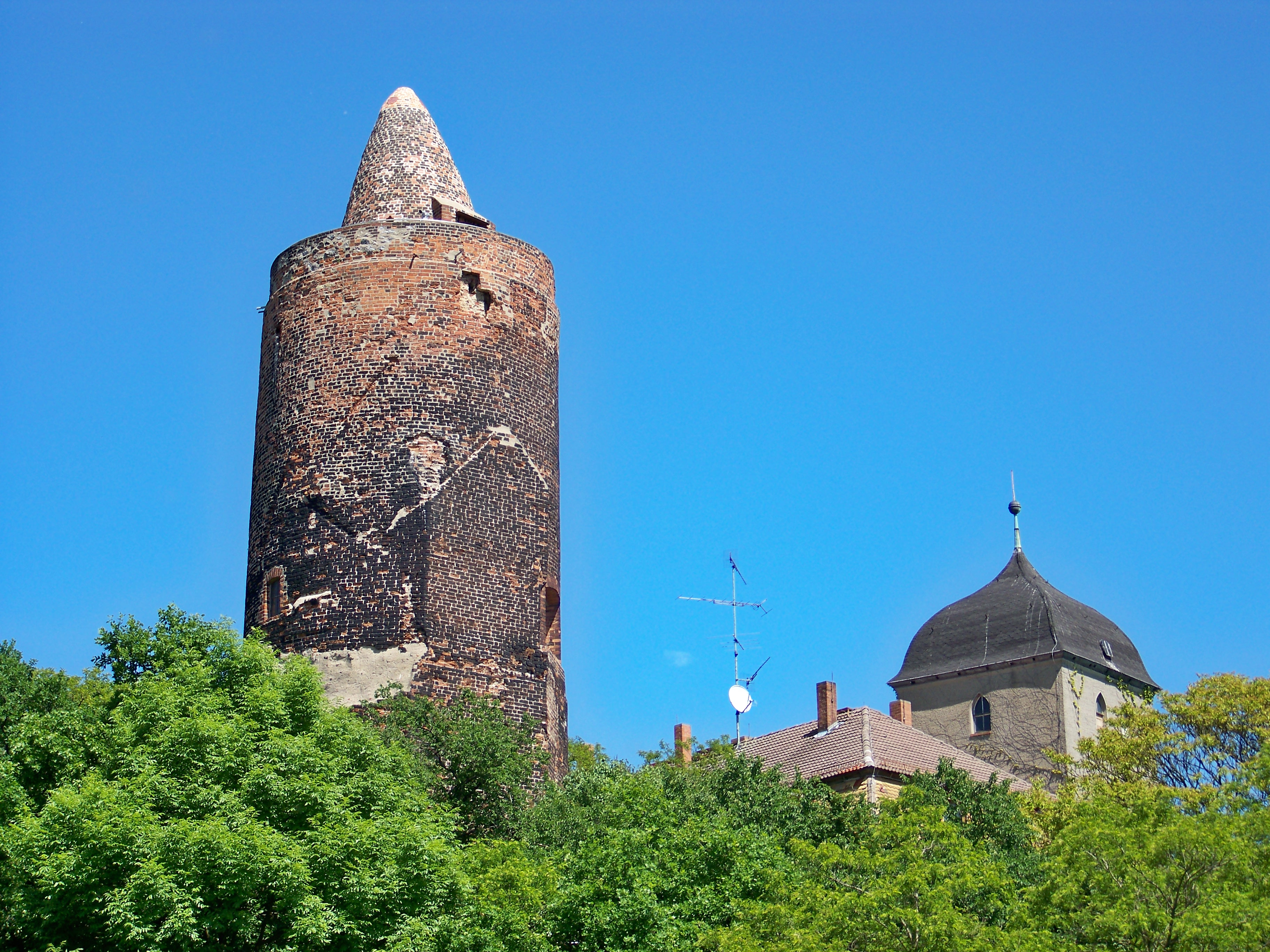
Pouch Castle with Red Tower

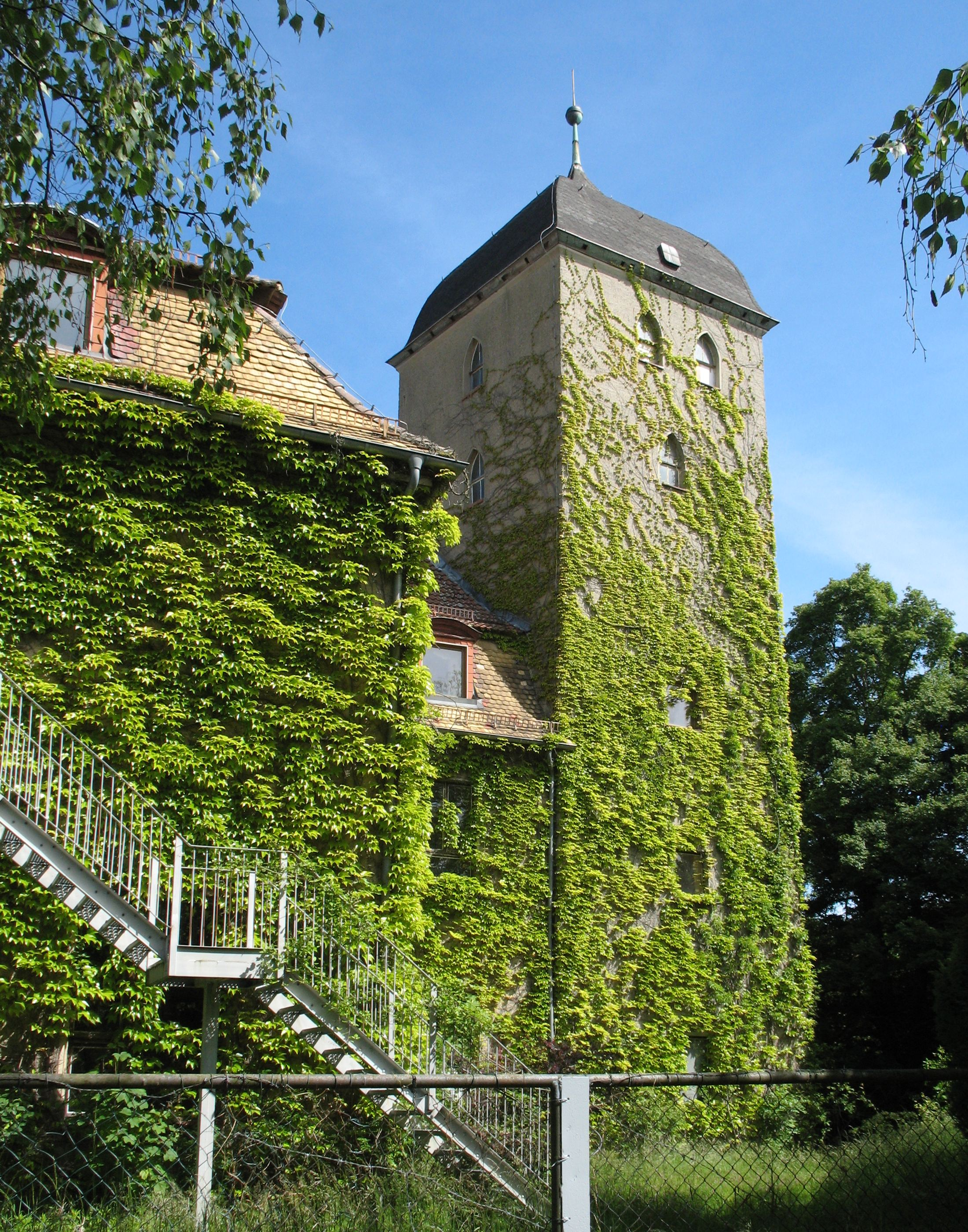
Castle

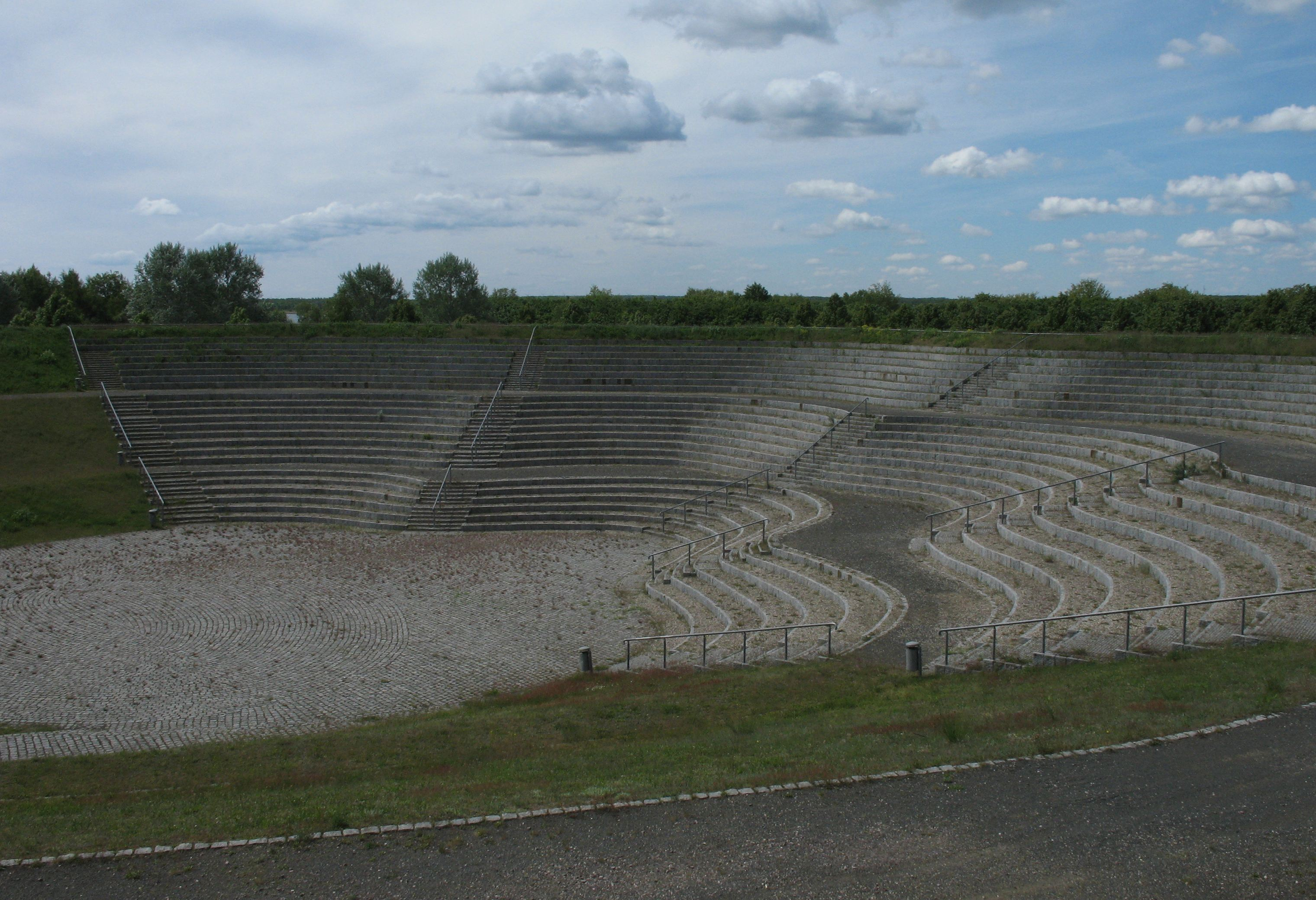
Amphitheatre

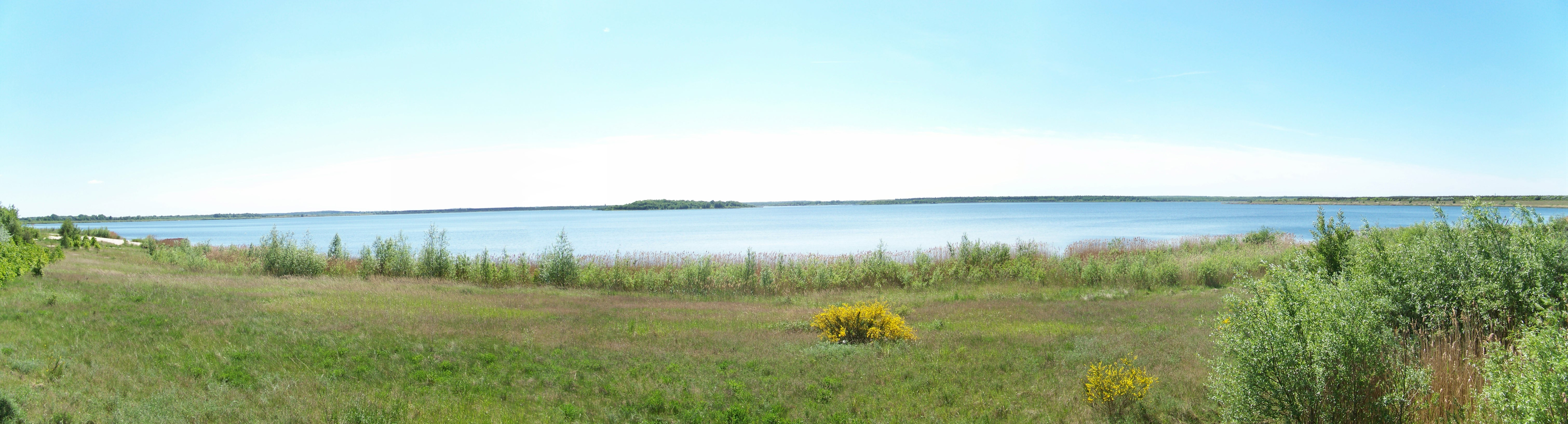
Lake Goitzsche
