= Muldestausee =

- Municipality
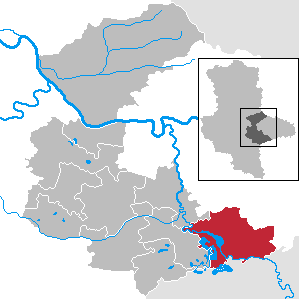
- Location of Muldestausee within Anhalt-Bitterfeld district
- Interactive map of Muldestausee
- Location within Germany Location within Saxony-Anhalt
- Coordinates: 51°39′27.5″N 12°26′12.9″E
- Country: Germany
- State: Saxony-Anhalt
- District: Anhalt-Bitterfeld

Government
  - Mayor (2023–30): Ferid Giebler

Area
  - Total: 137.52 km^{2} (53.10 sq mi)

Population (2025-12-31)
  - Total: 11,435
  - Density: 83.152/km^{2} (215.36/sq mi)
- Time zone: UTC+01:00 (CET)
  - Summer (DST): UTC+02:00 (CEST)
- Postal codes: 06774
- Dialling codes: 03493, 034955
- Vehicle registration: ABI
- Website: www.gemeinde-muldestausee.de

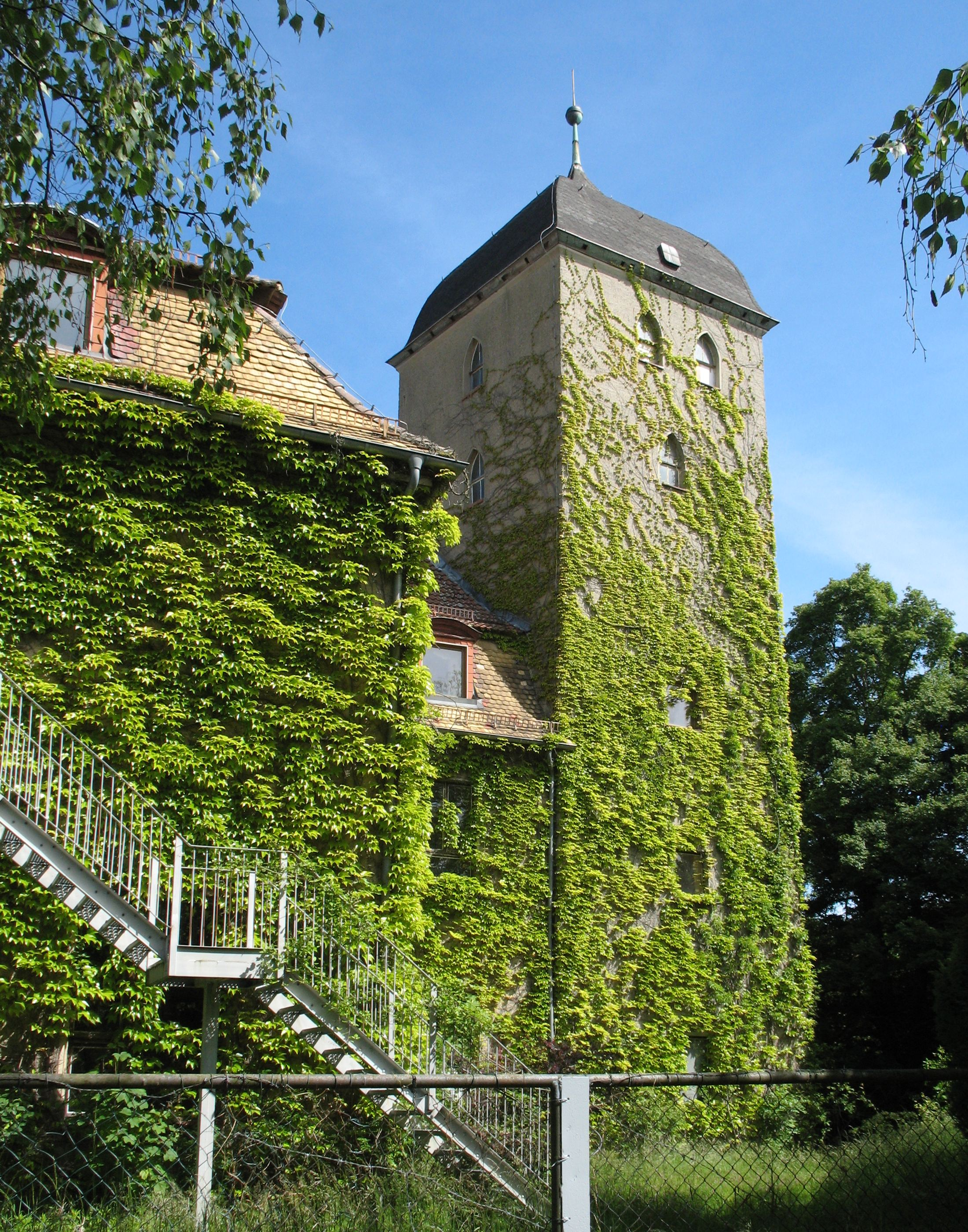
Castle in Pouch

Muldestausee (German pronunciation: [ˈmʊldəˌʃtaʊzeː]) is a municipality in the district of Anhalt-Bitterfeld, in Saxony-Anhalt, Germany. It was formed on 1 January 2010 by the merger of the former municipalities Burgkemnitz, Friedersdorf, Gossa, Gröbern, Krina, Mühlbeck, Muldenstein, Plodda, Pouch, Rösa, Schlaitz and Schwemsal.

The municipality consists of the Ortschaften or municipal divisions Burgkemnitz, Friedersdorf, Gossa, Gröbern, Krina, Mühlbeck, Muldenstein, Plodda, Pouch, Rösa, Schlaitz, Schmerz and Schwemsal. Its seat is in the village Pouch.
