= Muldenstein =

- Ortsteil of Muldestausee
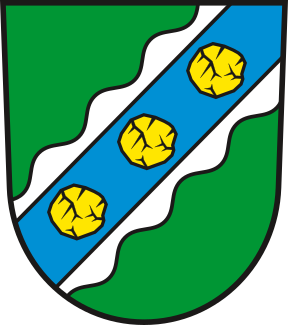
- Coat of arms
- Interactive map of Muldenstein
- Location within Germany Location within Saxony-Anhalt
- Coordinates: 51°40′19″N 12°20′59″E
- Country: Germany
- State: Saxony-Anhalt
- District: Anhalt-Bitterfeld
- Municipality: Muldestausee

Area
  - Total: 3.57 km^{2} (1.38 sq mi)
- Elevation: 90 m (300 ft)

Population (2006-12-31)
  - Total: 2,154
  - Density: 603/km^{2} (1,560/sq mi)
- Time zone: UTC+01:00 (CET)
  - Summer (DST): UTC+02:00 (CEST)
- Postal codes: 06804
- Dialling codes: 03493
- Vehicle registration: ABI
- Website: muldenstein.de

Muldenstein (German pronunciation: [ˈmʊldn̩ˌʃtaɪn]) is a village and a former municipality in the district of Anhalt-Bitterfeld, in Saxony-Anhalt, Germany. Since 1 January 2010, it is part of the municipality Muldestausee.
