= Bitterfeld =

Town, part of Bitterfeld-Wolfen, Germany

- Stadtteil of Bitterfeld-Wolfen
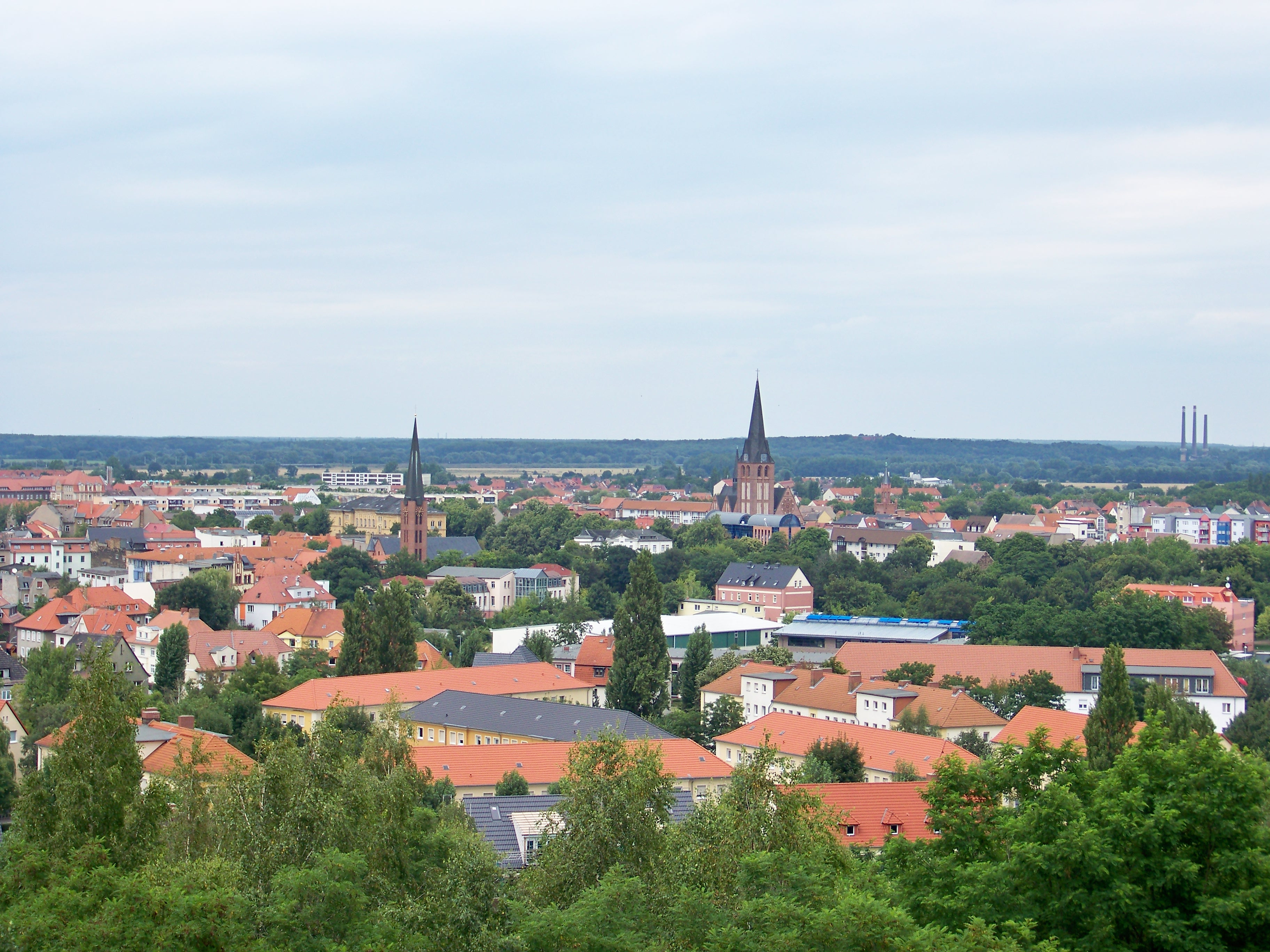

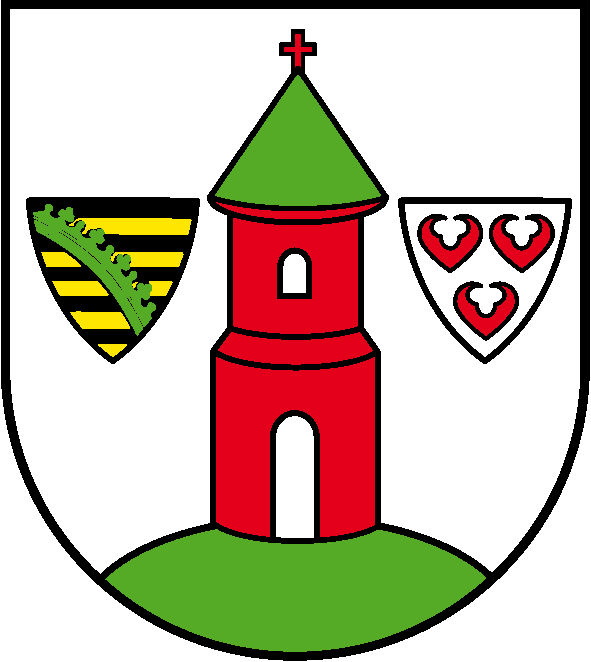
- Coat of arms
- Interactive map of Bitterfeld
- Location within Germany Location within Saxony-Anhalt
- Coordinates: 51°37′26″N 12°19′48″E
- Country: Germany
- State: Saxony-Anhalt
- District: Anhalt-Bitterfeld
- Town: Bitterfeld-Wolfen

Area
  - Total: 27.85 km^{2} (10.75 sq mi)

Population (2021-12-31)
  - Total: 14,448
  - Density: 518.8/km^{2} (1,344/sq mi)
- Time zone: UTC+01:00 (CET)
  - Summer (DST): UTC+02:00 (CEST)
- Postal codes: 06766, 06749
- Dialling codes: 03493, 03494
- Vehicle registration: ABI
- Website: Website

Bitterfeld (German pronunciation: [ˈbɪtɐfɛlt]) is a town in the district of Anhalt-Bitterfeld, Saxony-Anhalt, Germany. Since 1 July 2007 it has been part of the town of Bitterfeld-Wolfen. It is situated approximately 25 km south of Dessau, and 30 km northeast of Halle (Saale).

== History and description ==
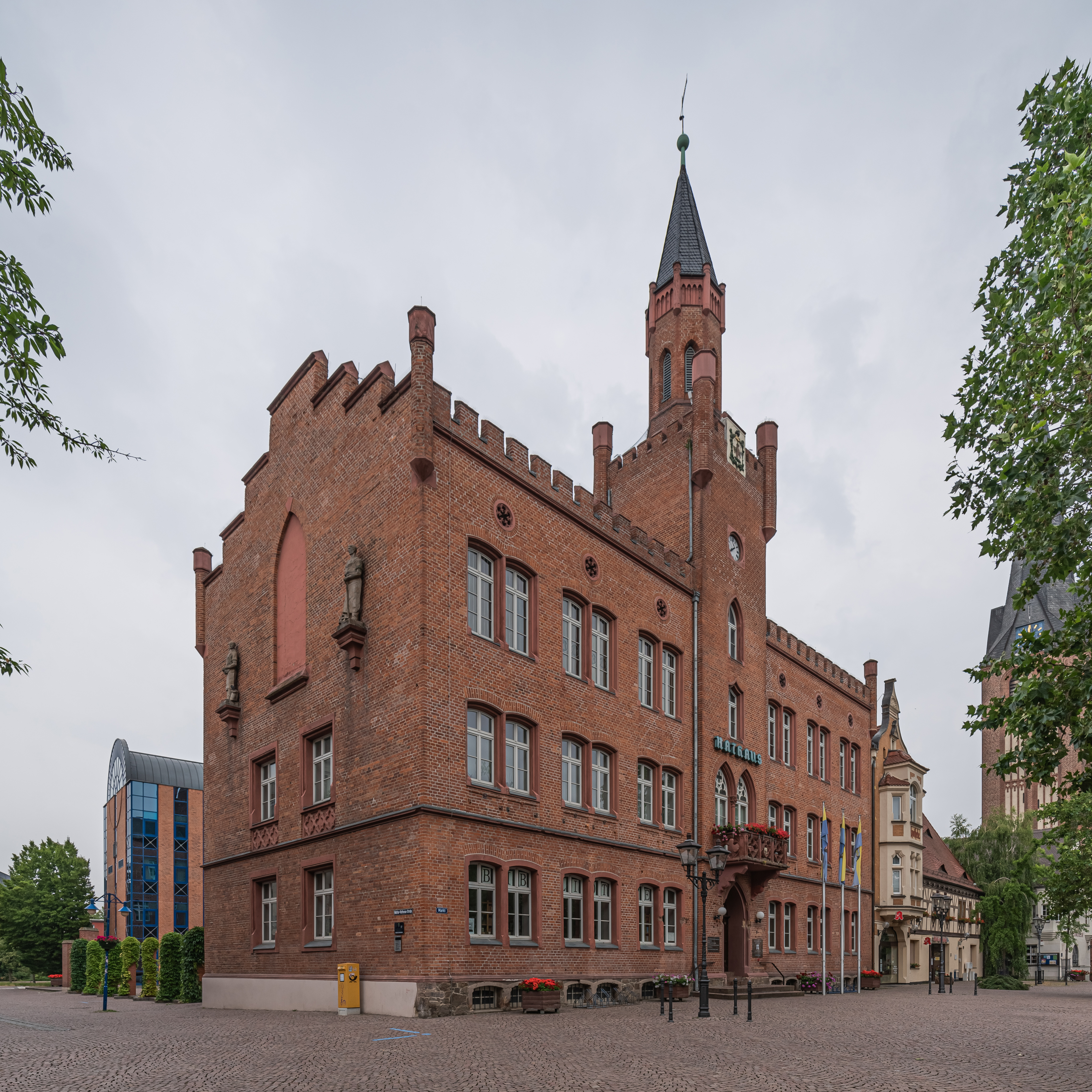
Town hall

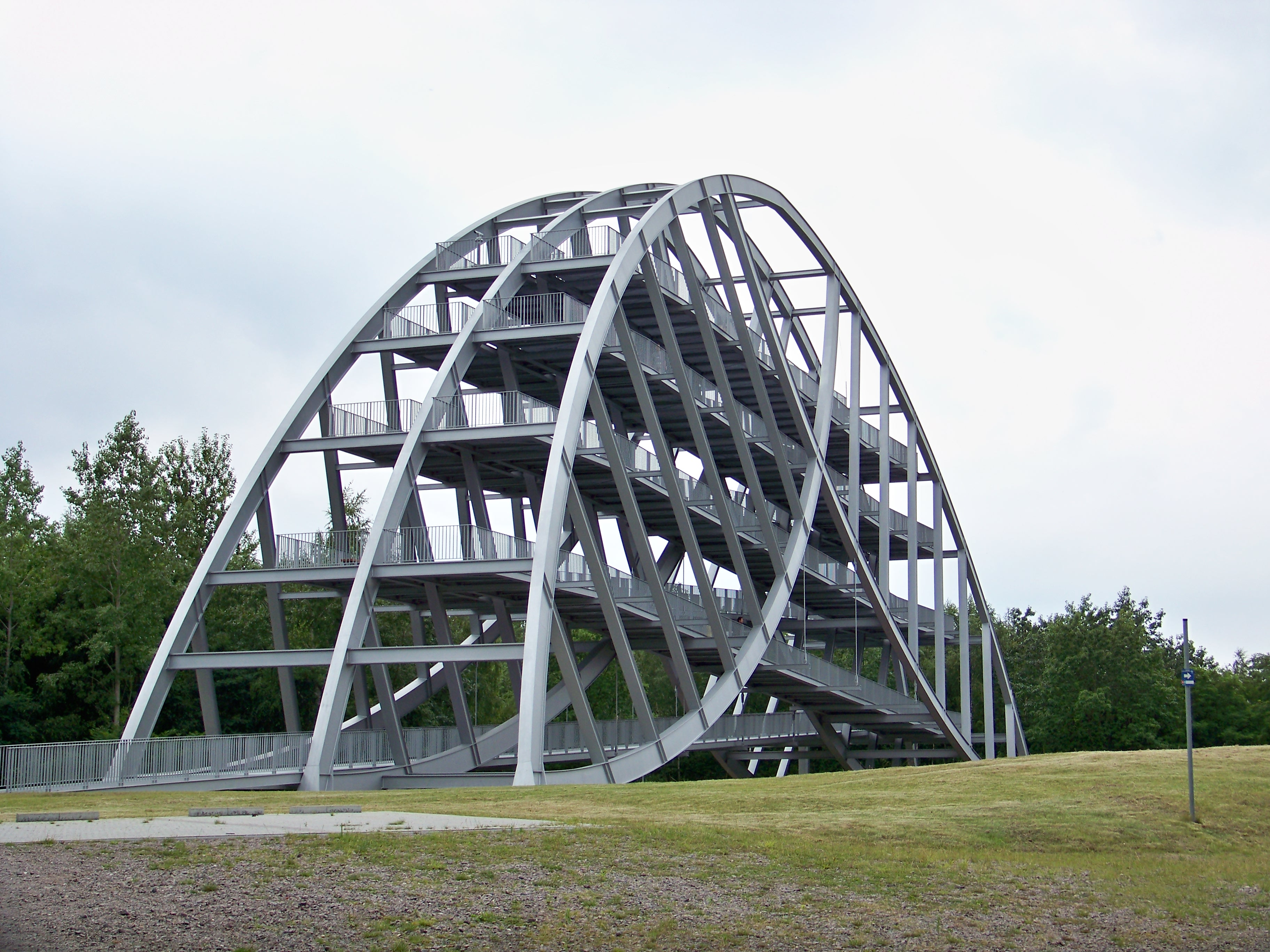
Bitterfeld Arch

The name Bitterfeld most likely comes from the Middle High German words bitter and Feld and so means "boggy land".

Bitterfeld was built by a colony of Flemish immigrants in 1153. The first documentary mention is from 1224. It was captured by the landgrave of Meissen in 1476, and belonged thenceforth to Saxony, until it was ceded to Prussia in 1815.

By 1900, Bitterfeld station was an important junction of the Berlin–Halle and the Magdeburg–Leipzig railways. The population at that time was 11,839; it manufactured drainpipes, paper roofing, and machinery, and had sawmills. There were also several coal mines in the vicinity. Owing to its pleasant situation and accessibility, it became a favoured residence of businessmen of Leipzig and Halle.

During the East German (GDR) era, it gained notoriety for its chemical industry complex which caused remarkably severe pollution, even by GDR standards. On 24 April 1959, it also was a scene for the Bitterfeld Conference, locally known as the "Bitterfelder Weg". This conference sought to connect the working class with the artists of the day to form a socialist national culture.

In the 21st century Bitterfeld is still an industrial town and it stages the annual United Metal Maniacs metal festival.

The former brown-coal open cast mine of Goitzsche, south-east of Bitterfeld, is a source of numerous fossils in Bitterfeld amber.

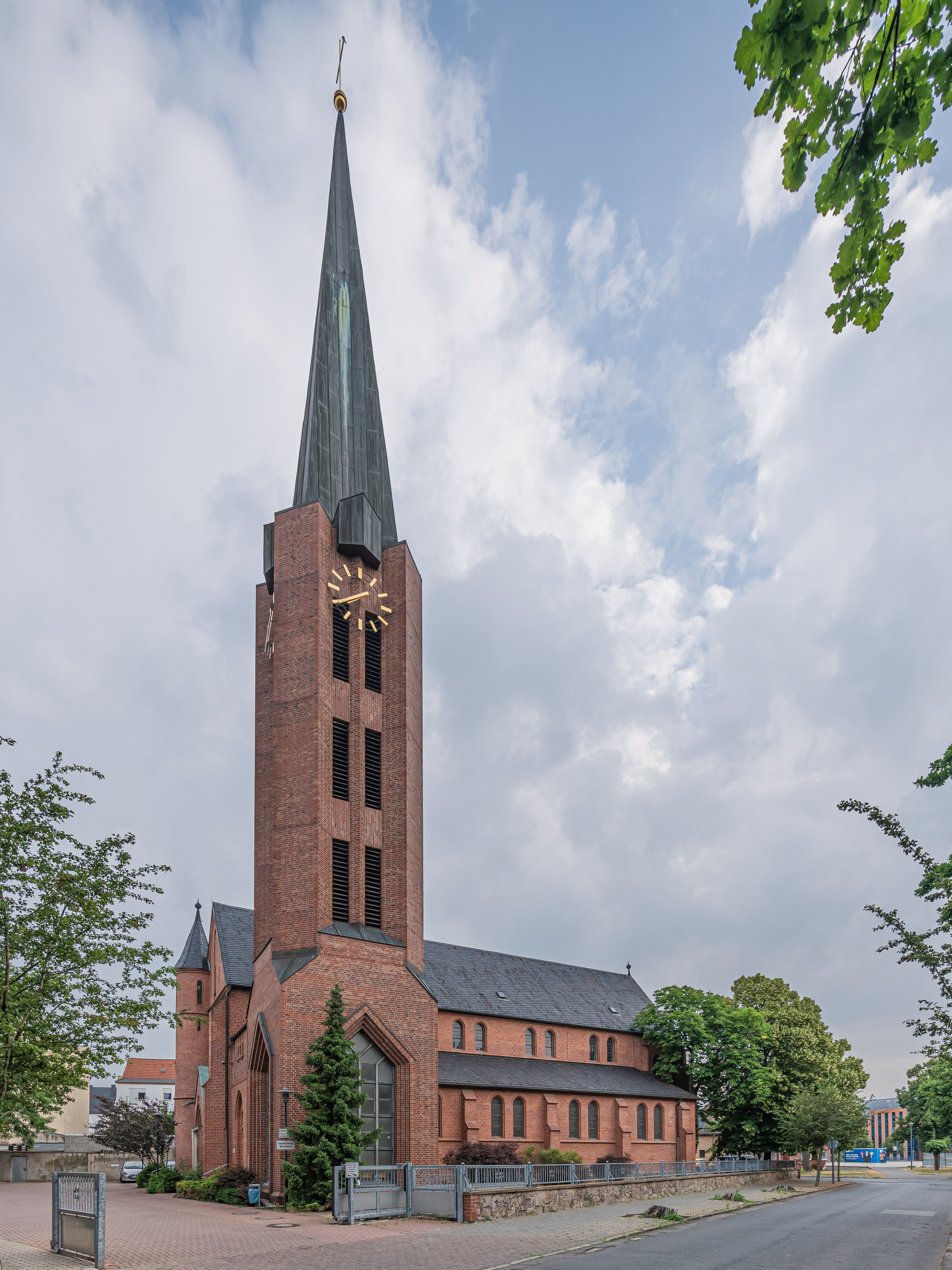
Catholic church

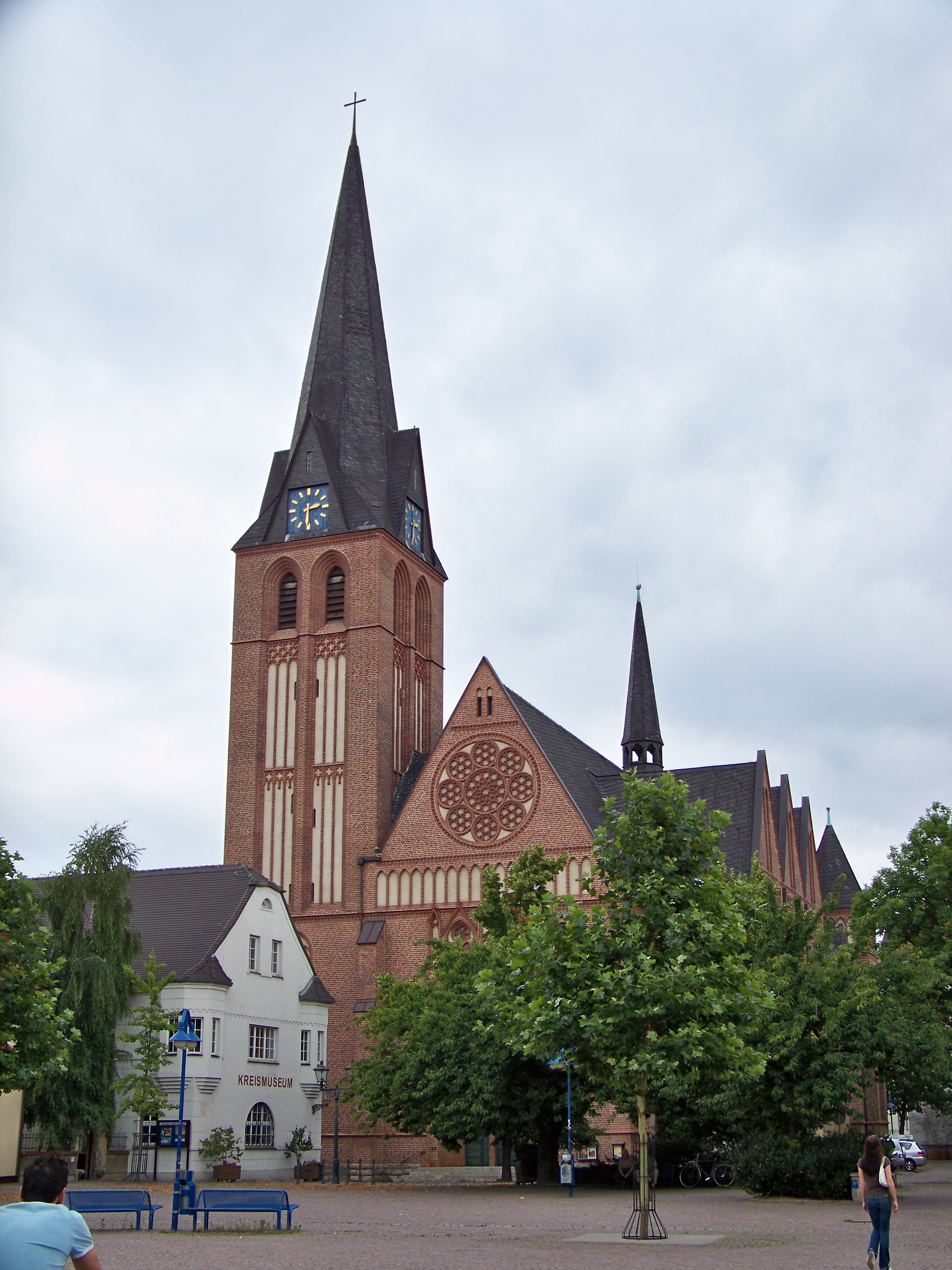
Evangelical church

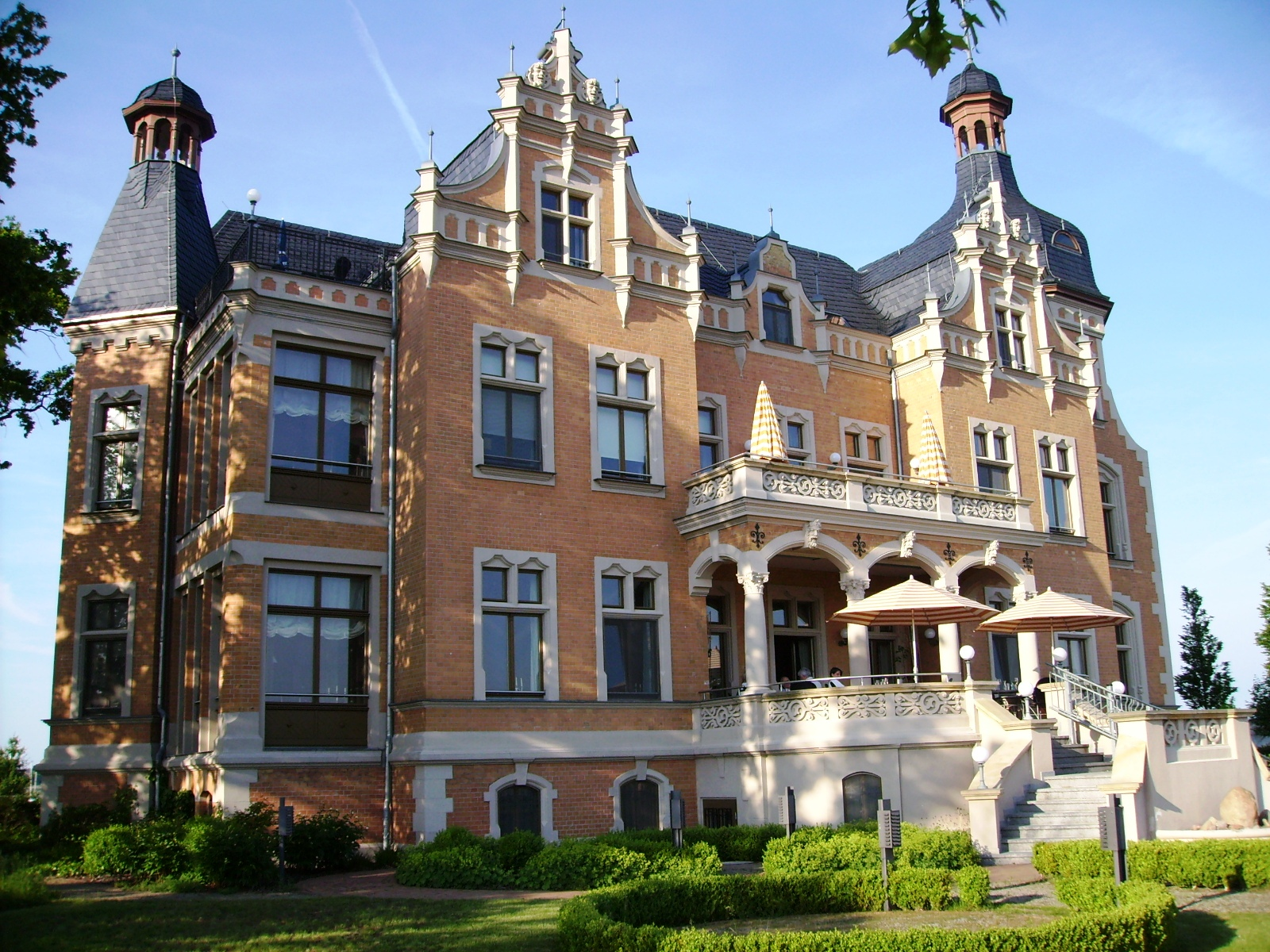
Villa am Bernsteinsee

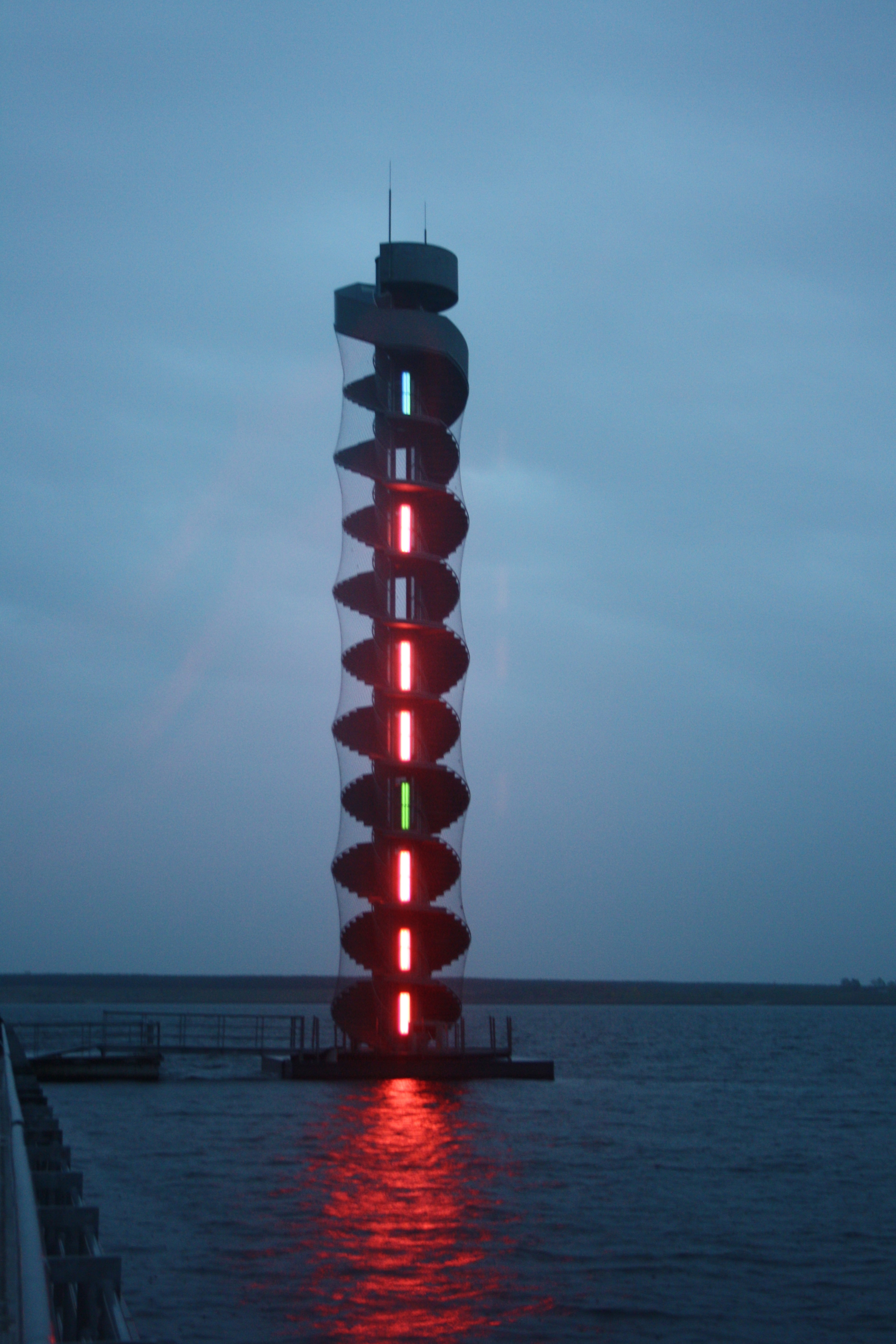
Pegelturm tower in Goitzschesee lake

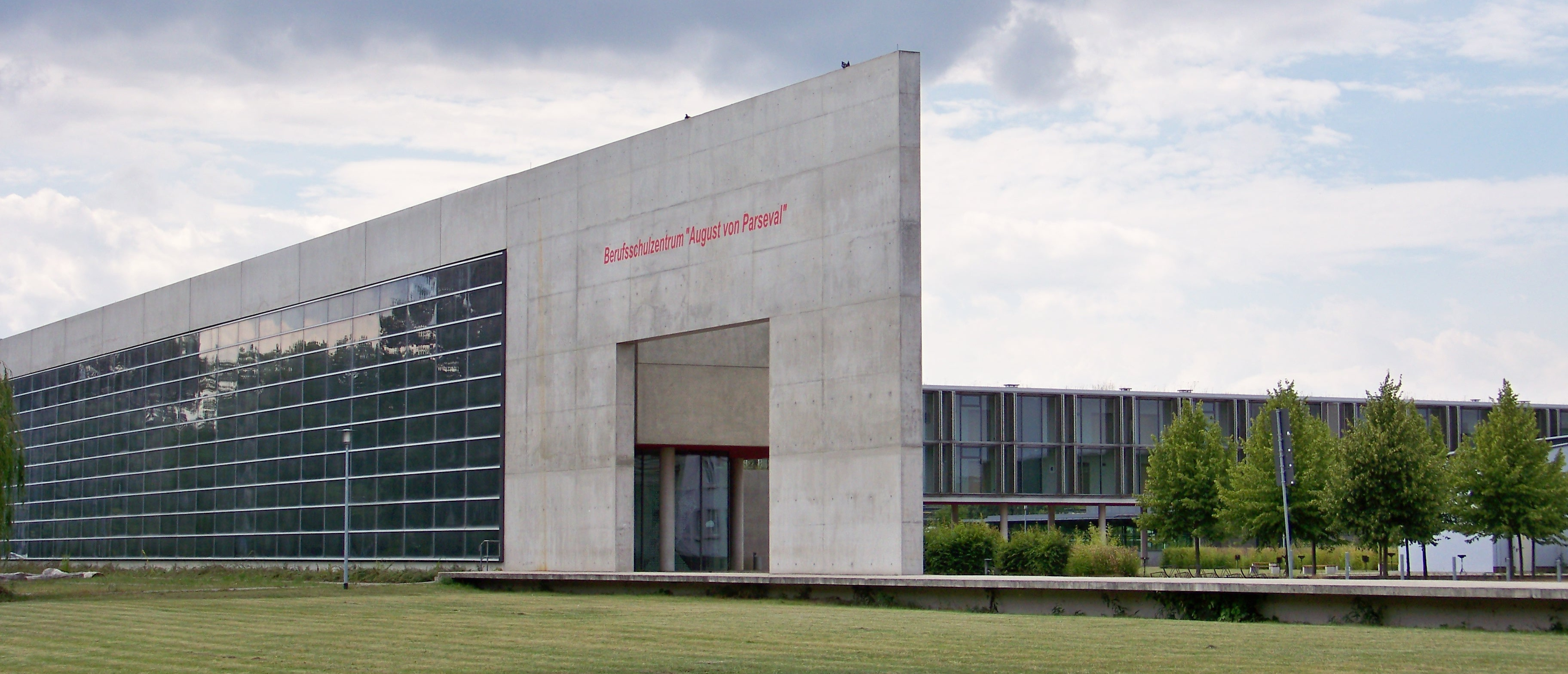
Vocational school center "August von Parseval"

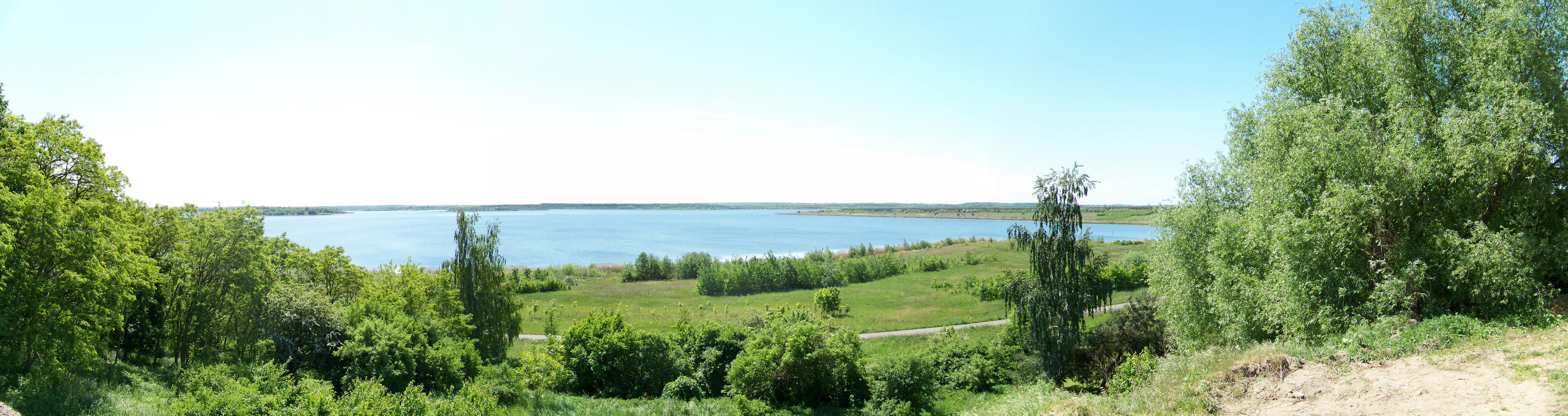
Großer Goitzschesee (lake)

=== Historical population ===
1840 to 1939
Year	Population
1840	4,649
1870	5,693
1880	6,531
1890	9,047
1925	18,384
1933	21,328
1939	23,949

1946 to 1995
Year	Population
1946	32,833 (Note: 29 October)
1950	32,814 (Note: 31 August)
1960	31,687
1981	22,199
1984	21,279
1990	18,099 (Note: 3 October)
1995	16,868

2000 to 2006
Year	Population
2000	16,507
2001	16,237
2002	15,985
2003	15.798
2004	15,755
2005	15,728
2006	15,709 (Note: 30 June)

(from 1840 to 2006):

Population graph 1840 to 2006

== Notable residents ==
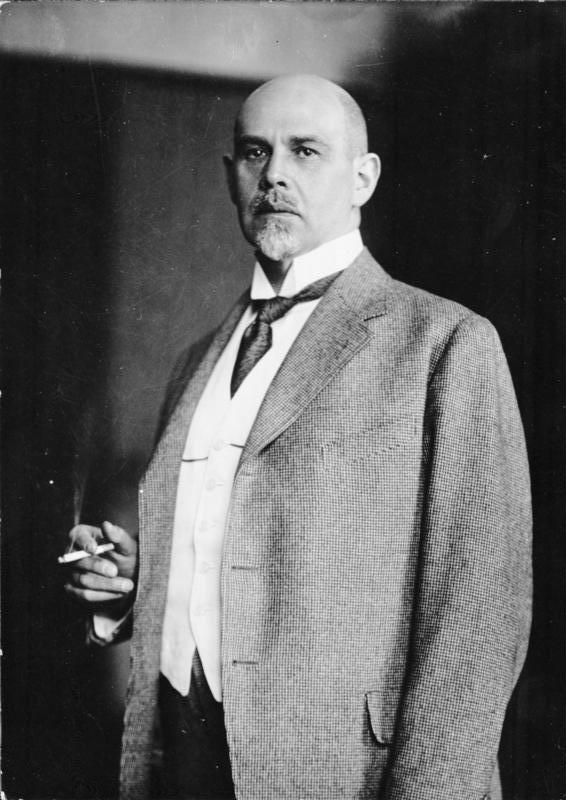
Walther Rathenau in 1921

- Johann Ernst Altenburg (1736-1801), trumpeter and organist
- August von Parseval (1861-1942), his impact airships developed by him were partly built in Bitterfeld.
- Walther Rathenau (1867-1922), founder of Bitterfeld's chemical industry.
- Erwin Ding-Schuler (1912-1945), sturmbannführer and first camp doctor of Buchenwald.
- Klaus Staeck (born 1938), graphic artist, lawyer and president of the academy of the arts, grew up in Bitterfeld.
- Peter Rasym (born 1953), musician, has been playing bass guitar since 1997 with the Puhdys.

== Mayors ==
- 1851-1863 Gottlieb Meuche
- 1863-1873 Gustav Frischbier
- 1873-1890 Robert Sommer († 1890)
- 1890-1914 Hugo Hermann Adalbert Dippe (1853; † 1916)
- 1915-1927 Ernst Albert Hermann Schmidt
- 1927-1939 Arthur Erdmann Ebermann
- 1939-1945 Erhard Johann Martin Nimz
- 1943-1945 Walter Stieb (Interim)
- 26 April 1945 to 30 August 1945 Gustav Dietrich (deselection by Soviet city commandant) († 1972)
- September 1945 to 1946 Bernhard Moder
- 1946-1949 Ernst Rettel
- 1949-1950 Karl Salbach
- 1950-1953 Heinz-Rudolf Strauch
- 1953-1959 Wolfgang Stille
- 1959-1971 Else Petrushka
- 1971-1979 Max Dittbrenner
- 1979-1982 Karlheinz Sohr
- 1982-1990 Klaus Barth
- 1990-1994 Edelgard Kauf
- 1994-2007 Werner Rauball
- 2007-2009 Horst Tischer
- From 2010 Joachim Gülland

== Literature ==
- Maron, Monika: Bitterfelder Bogen. Ein Bericht. Fischer Verlag, Frankfurt am Main 2009, ISBN 978-3-10-048828-2.
- Lojewsky, Hannelore: Seh’n wir uns nicht in dieser Welt, so seh’n wir uns in Bitterfeld. In: Norbert Kühne: Individuelles Lernen wird an Bedeutung gewinnen. 100 Jahre Hans-Böckler-Berufskolleg Marl/Haltern, Marl 2009, S. 29–30.
- Klaus Seehafer: Dann sehn wir uns in Bitterfeld. Tagebuch eines Jahres. Mitteldeutscher Verlag, Halle/S. 2009, ISBN 3-89812-664-1.
- Bitterfeld und das untere Muldetal. Edition no. 1 Böhlau, Cologne; Weimar; Vienna 2004, ISBN 3-412-03803-2 (Werte der deutschen Heimat. Vol. 66).
- Hackenholz, Dirk: Die elektrochemischen Werke in Bitterfeld 1914–1945. Ein Standort der IG-Farbenindustrie AG. LIT Verlag, Münster 2004, ISBN 3-8258-7656-X.
