= Gossa, Germany =

Gossa
- Ortsteil of Muldestausee
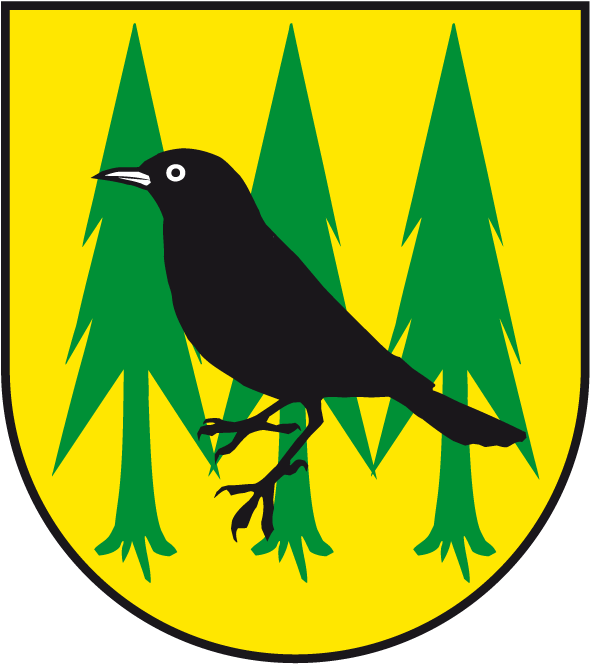
- Coat of arms
- Interactive map of Gossa
- Location within Germany Location within Saxony-Anhalt
- Coordinates: 51°40′12″N 12°26′42″E
- Country: Germany
- State: Saxony-Anhalt
- District: Anhalt-Bitterfeld
- Municipality: Muldestausee

Area
  - Total: 9.62 km^{2} (3.71 sq mi)
- Elevation: 103 m (338 ft)

Population (2006-12-31)
  - Total: 885
  - Density: 92.0/km^{2} (238/sq mi)
- Time zone: UTC+01:00 (CET)
  - Summer (DST): UTC+02:00 (CEST)
- Postal codes: 06774
- Dialling codes: 034955
- Vehicle registration: ABI

Gossa (German pronunciation: [ˈɡɔsa]) is a village and a former municipality in the district of Anhalt-Bitterfeld, in Saxony-Anhalt, Germany. Since 1 January 2010, it is part of the municipality Muldestausee.
