= Raguhn (Verwaltungsgemeinschaft) =

Former municipal association in Saxony-Anhalt, Germany

Coordinates: 51.717°N 12.283°E

Raguhn was a Verwaltungsgemeinschaft ("collective municipality") in the Anhalt-Bitterfeld district, Saxony-Anhalt, Germany. The seat of the Verwaltungsgemeinschaft was in Raguhn. It was disbanded on 1 January 2010.

The Verwaltungsgemeinschaft Raguhn consisted of the following municipalities:

- Altjeßnitz
- Jeßnitz
- Marke
- Raguhn
- Retzau
- Schierau
- Thurland
- Tornau vor der Heide
