= Köthen (district) =

Coordinates: 51°44′55″N 11°58′09″E

- District
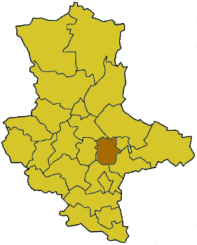
- Country: Germany
- State: Saxony-Anhalt
- Disbanded: 2007-07-01
- Capital: Köthen

Area
  - Total: 475.11 km^{2} (183.44 sq mi)

Population (2006-06-30)
  - Total: 65,096
  - Density: 140/km^{2} (350/sq mi)
- Time zone: UTC+01:00 (CET)
  - Summer (DST): UTC+02:00 (CEST)
- Vehicle registration: KÖT

Köthen was a district (Kreis) in the middle of Saxony-Anhalt, Germany. Neighboring districts were (from north clockwise) Anhalt-Zerbst, Schönebeck, Anhalt-Zerbst, the district-free city Dessau, Bitterfeld, Saalkreis and Bernburg.

== History ==
In 1603 the principality of Anhalt-Köthen was created, when the principality of Anhalt was split in five parts. In 1665 it merged with Anhalt-Plötzkau, and in 1807 it became a duchy. 1847 it was divided between Anhalt-Dessau and Anhalt-Bernburg, and in 1853 it was merged with Anhalt-Dessau to form the Duchy of Anhalt-Dessau-Köthen.

When in 1863 the various parts of Anhalt were reunited, the district was created. At first the district Dessau-Köthen did cover the area surrounding the two district-free cities Dessau and Köthen. In 1950 the city of Köthen was added to the district, and it was renamed after its capital. As result of the district reform of 2007, the area was merged into the new district of Anhalt-Bitterfeld with the city of Köthen as its capital.

== Geography ==
The district is located in the Magdeburger Börde, with soft hills from the moraines from the last ice age. The river Elbe forms part of the northern boundary of the district.

== Coat of arms ==
The left half of the coat of arms shows a wing, which was the symbol of the family Von Cöthen, who probably founded the castle Köthen in the 12th century. The family became extinct in the 14th century. The right side shows a palm, which is the symbol of the palm order (however their official name was Fruchtbringenden Gesellschaft - fruit growing society). This order was founded by Prince Ludwig of Anhalt-Köthen in 1617, and was an association of nobles, scientists and poets. Their main goal was the care of the German language. However the society already dissolved in 1680.

== Towns and municipalities ==
Towns
Verwaltungsgemeinschaften
1. Aken
2. Gröbzig
3. Köthen
4. Radegast
1. Osternienburg
2. Südliches Anhalt (incl. towns Gröbzig and Radegast)

== See also ==
- Principality of Anhalt-Köthen
