= Axel Peschel =

German cyclist

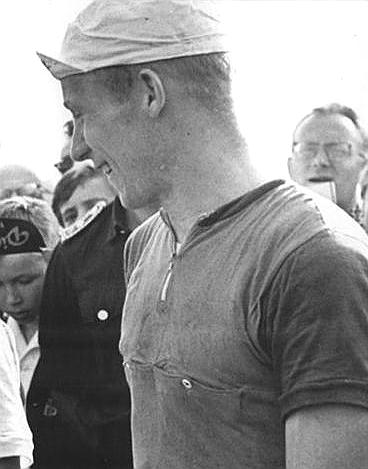

Personal information
- Born: 2 August 1942 (age 84) Maasdorf, Germany

Cycling career
- Sport: Cycling

Axel Hermann Peschel (born 2 August 1942) is a German former cyclist. His sporting career began with SC Dynamo Berlin. He competed for East Germany in the team time trial at the 1968 Summer Olympics. Peschel won the Peace Race in 1968. He won the DDR Rundfahrt in 1965 and 1967.

His son, Uwe Peschel, won Olympic gold in cycling at the 1992 Summer Olympics.
