= Scheuder =

- Stadtteil of Südliches Anhalt
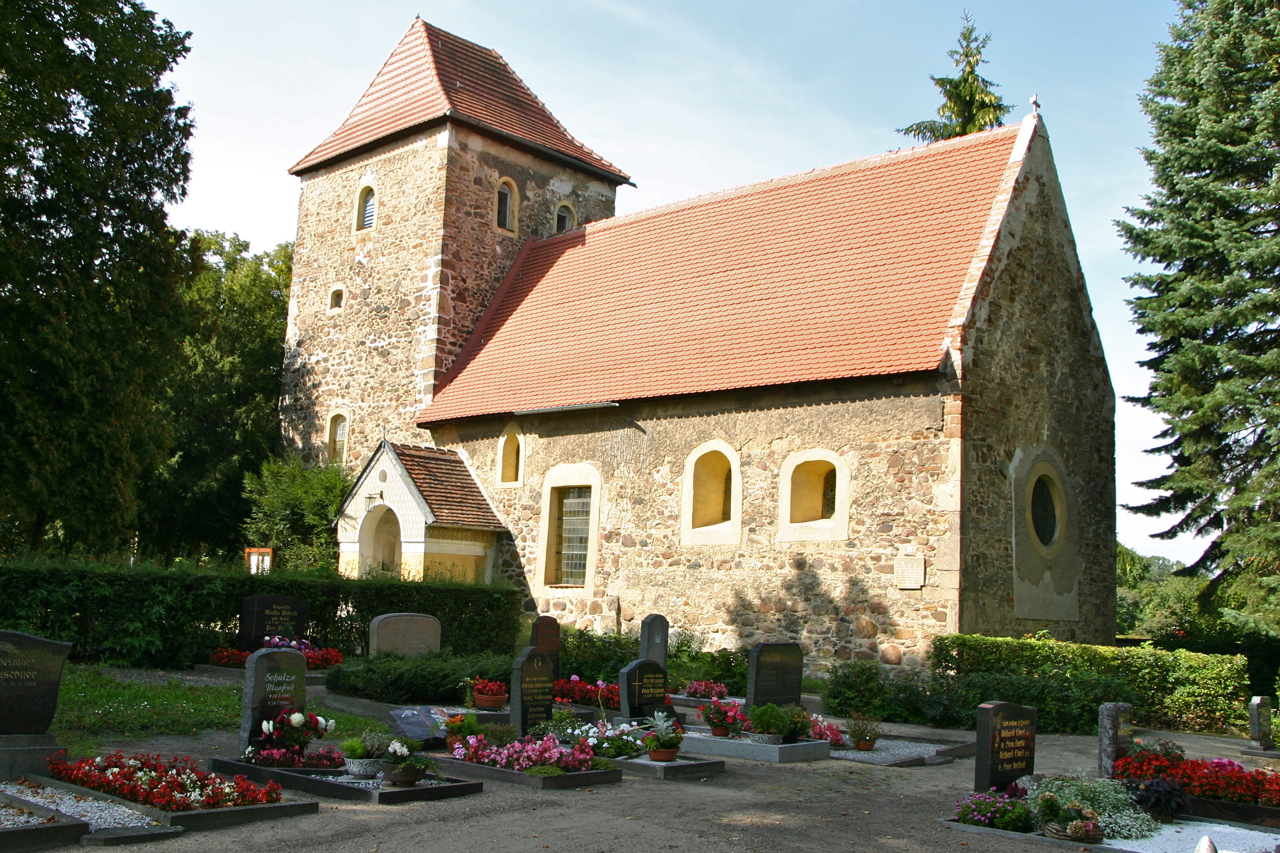
- Interactive map of Scheuder
- Location within Germany Location within Saxony-Anhalt
- Coordinates: 51°46′N 12°4′E
- Country: Germany
- State: Saxony-Anhalt
- District: Anhalt-Bitterfeld
- Town: Südliches Anhalt

Area
  - Total: 9.8 km^{2} (3.8 sq mi)
- Elevation: 73 m (240 ft)

Population (2006-12-31)
  - Total: 347
  - Density: 35/km^{2} (92/sq mi)
- Time zone: UTC+01:00 (CET)
  - Summer (DST): UTC+02:00 (CEST)
- Postal codes: 06386
- Dialling codes: 034977
- Vehicle registration: ABI
- Website: www.koethener-land.de

Scheuder (German pronunciation: [ˈʃɔʏdɐ]) is a village and a former municipality in the district of Anhalt-Bitterfeld, in Saxony-Anhalt, Germany. On 1 January 2010, it joined several other municipalities to form the town Südliches Anhalt.
