= Trebbichau an der Fuhne =

- Stadtteil of Südliches Anhalt
- Trebbichau an der Fuhne in 2011.
- Interactive map of Trebbichau an der Fuhne
- Location within Germany Location within Saxony-Anhalt
- Coordinates: 51°38′51″N 11°57′19″E
- Country: Germany
- State: Saxony-Anhalt
- District: Anhalt-Bitterfeld
- Town: Südliches Anhalt

Area
  - Total: 4.23 km^{2} (1.63 sq mi)
- Elevation: 76 m (249 ft)

Population (2006-12-31)
  - Total: 368
  - Density: 87.0/km^{2} (225/sq mi)
- Time zone: UTC+01:00 (CET)
  - Summer (DST): UTC+02:00 (CEST)
- Postal codes: 06369
- Dialling codes: 034975
- Vehicle registration: ABI
- Website: www.suedliches-anhalt.de

Trebbichau an der Fuhne (German pronunciation: [ˈtʁɛbɪçaʊ ʔan deːɐ̯ ˈfuːnə], lit. 'Trebbichau on the Fuhne') is a village and a former municipality in the district of Anhalt-Bitterfeld, in Saxony-Anhalt, Germany. Since 1 January 2010, it is part of the town Südliches Anhalt.
