= Meilendorf =

- Stadtteil of Südliches Anhalt
- Interactive map of Meilendorf
- Location within Germany Location within Saxony-Anhalt
- Coordinates: 51°43′N 12°6′E
- Country: Germany
- State: Saxony-Anhalt
- District: Anhalt-Bitterfeld
- Town: Südliches Anhalt

Area
  - Total: 7.89 km^{2} (3.05 sq mi)
- Elevation: 84 m (276 ft)

Population (2006-12-31)
  - Total: 250
  - Density: 32/km^{2} (82/sq mi)
- Time zone: UTC+01:00 (CET)
  - Summer (DST): UTC+02:00 (CEST)
- Postal codes: 06386
- Dialling codes: 034977

Meilendorf (German pronunciation: [ˈmaɪlənˌdɔʁf]) is a village and a former municipality in the district of Anhalt-Bitterfeld, in Saxony-Anhalt, Germany.

Since 1 January 2010, it is part of the town Südliches Anhalt.
