= Quellendorf =

- Stadtteil of Südliches Anhalt
- Coat of arms
- Interactive map of Quellendorf
- Location within Germany Location within Saxony-Anhalt
- Coordinates: 51°44′52″N 12°7′43″E
- Country: Germany
- State: Saxony-Anhalt
- District: Anhalt-Bitterfeld
- Town: Südliches Anhalt

Area
  - Total: 20.41 km^{2} (7.88 sq mi)
- Elevation: 79 m (259 ft)

Population (2006-12-31)
  - Total: 1,027
  - Density: 50.32/km^{2} (130.3/sq mi)
- Time zone: UTC+01:00 (CET)
  - Summer (DST): UTC+02:00 (CEST)
- Postal codes: 06386
- Dialling codes: 034977
- Vehicle registration: ABI
- Website: www.vg-suedliches-anhalt.de

Quellendorf (German pronunciation: [ˈkvɛlənˌdɔʁf]) is a village and a former municipality in the district of Anhalt-Bitterfeld, in Saxony-Anhalt, Germany. Since 1 January 2010, it is part of the town Südliches Anhalt.

In the 19th century the estate was the property of General Count Henckel von Donnersmarck who sold it to Field Marshal Count Leonhardt von Blumenthal after the Franco-Prussian War. The Field Marshal later transferred ownership to his son-in-law, Rudolf von Oettinger.
