= Glauzig =

- Stadtteil of Südliches Anhalt
- Interactive map of Glauzig
- Location within Germany Location within Saxony-Anhalt
- Coordinates: 51°39′N 12°0′E
- Country: Germany
- State: Saxony-Anhalt
- District: Anhalt-Bitterfeld
- Town: Südliches Anhalt

Area
  - Total: 3.21 km^{2} (1.24 sq mi)
- Elevation: 75 m (246 ft)

Population (2006-12-31)
  - Total: 469
  - Density: 146/km^{2} (378/sq mi)
- Time zone: UTC+01:00 (CET)
  - Summer (DST): UTC+02:00 (CEST)
- Postal codes: 06369
- Dialling codes: 034975
- Vehicle registration: ABI

Glauzig (German pronunciation: [ˈɡlaʊtsɪç]) is a village and a former municipality in the district of Anhalt-Bitterfeld, in Saxony-Anhalt, Germany.

Since 1 January 2010, it is part of the town Südliches Anhalt.
