= Reupzig =

- Stadtteil of Südliches Anhalt
- Interactive map of Reupzig
- Location within Germany Location within Saxony-Anhalt
- Coordinates: 51°44′N 12°4′E
- Country: Germany
- State: Saxony-Anhalt
- District: Anhalt-Bitterfeld
- Town: Südliches Anhalt

Area
  - Total: 8.58 km^{2} (3.31 sq mi)
- Elevation: 79 m (259 ft)

Population (2006-12-31)
  - Total: 328
  - Density: 38.2/km^{2} (99.0/sq mi)
- Time zone: UTC+01:00 (CET)
  - Summer (DST): UTC+02:00 (CEST)
- Postal codes: 06369
- Dialling codes: 034977

Reupzig (German pronunciation: [ˈʁɔʏptsɪç]) is a village and a former municipality in the district of Anhalt-Bitterfeld, in Saxony-Anhalt, Germany.

Since 1 January 2010, it is part of the town Südliches Anhalt.
