= Piethen =

- Stadtteil of Südliches Anhalt
- Interactive map of Piethen
- Location within Germany Location within Saxony-Anhalt
- Coordinates: 51°40′N 11°56′E
- Country: Germany
- State: Saxony-Anhalt
- District: Anhalt-Bitterfeld
- Town: Südliches Anhalt

Area
  - Total: 4.23 km^{2} (1.63 sq mi)
- Elevation: 89 m (292 ft)

Population (2009-12-31)
  - Total: 270
  - Density: 64/km^{2} (170/sq mi)
- Time zone: UTC+01:00 (CET)
  - Summer (DST): UTC+02:00 (CEST)
- Postal codes: 06388
- Dialling codes: 034976
- Vehicle registration: ABI

Piethen (German pronunciation: [ˈpiːtn̩]) is a village and a former municipality in the district of Anhalt-Bitterfeld, in Saxony-Anhalt, Germany. Since 1 September 2010, it is part of the town Südliches Anhalt.
