= Riesdorf =

Village in Saxony-Anhalt, Germany

- Stadtteil of Südliches Anhalt
- Interactive map of Riesdorf
- Location within Germany Location within Saxony-Anhalt
- Coordinates: 51°41′33″N 12°6′33″E
- Country: Germany
- State: Saxony-Anhalt
- District: Anhalt-Bitterfeld
- Town: Südliches Anhalt

Area
  - Total: 4.63 km^{2} (1.79 sq mi)
- Elevation: 85 m (279 ft)

Population (2006-12-31)
  - Total: 135
  - Density: 29.2/km^{2} (75.5/sq mi)
- Time zone: UTC+01:00 (CET)
  - Summer (DST): UTC+02:00 (CEST)
- Postal codes: 06369
- Dialling codes: 034978
- Vehicle registration: ABI
- Website: www.suedliches-anhalt.de

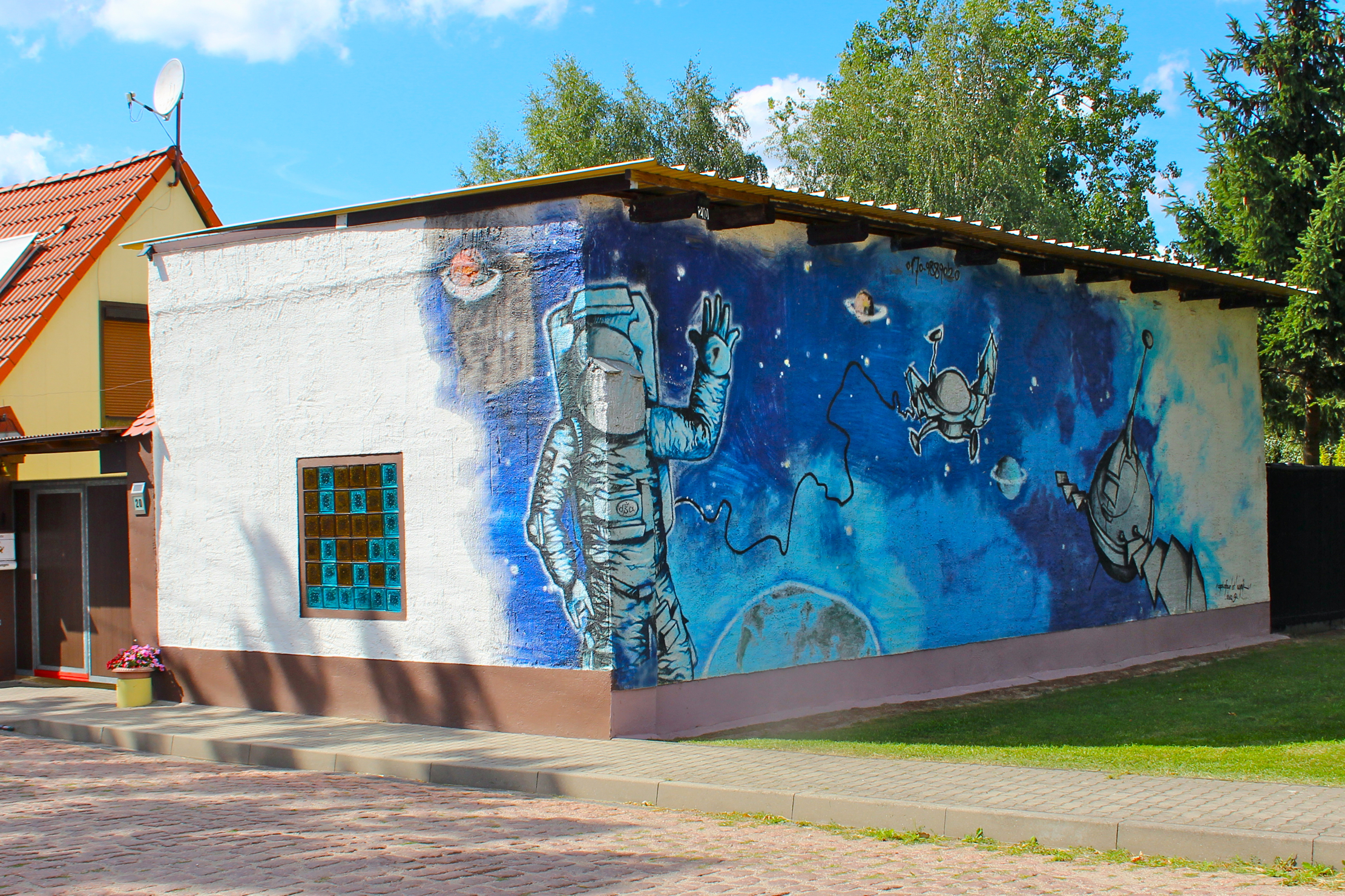

Riesdorf (German pronunciation: [ˈʁiːsˌdɔʁf]) is a village and a former municipality in the district of Anhalt-Bitterfeld, in Saxony-Anhalt, Germany.

Since 1 January 2010, it has been part of the town Südliches Anhalt.
