= Großbadegast =

- Stadtteil of Südliches Anhalt
- Interactive map of Großbadegast
- Location within Germany Location within Saxony-Anhalt
- Coordinates: 51°44′N 12°2′E
- Country: Germany
- State: Saxony-Anhalt
- District: Anhalt-Bitterfeld
- Town: Südliches Anhalt

Area
  - Total: 11.19 km^{2} (4.32 sq mi)
- Elevation: 80 m (260 ft)

Population (2006-12-31)
  - Total: 683
  - Density: 61.0/km^{2} (158/sq mi)
- Time zone: UTC+01:00 (CET)
  - Summer (DST): UTC+02:00 (CEST)
- Postal codes: 06369
- Dialling codes: 03496
- Vehicle registration: ABI

Großbadegast (German pronunciation: [ˈɡʁoːsˌbaːdəɡast]) is a village and a former municipality in the district of Anhalt-Bitterfeld, in Saxony-Anhalt, Germany.

Since 1 January 2010, it is part of the town Südliches Anhalt.

== People ==
- Franz Krüger (1797–1857), prussian painter
- Otto Theodor von Seydewitz (1818–1898), prussian politician
