= Edderitz =

- Stadtteil of Südliches Anhalt
- Coat of arms
- Interactive map of Edderitz
- Location within Germany Location within Saxony-Anhalt
- Coordinates: 51°41′N 11°56′E
- Country: Germany
- State: Saxony-Anhalt
- District: Anhalt-Bitterfeld
- Town: Südliches Anhalt

Area
  - Total: 10.26 km^{2} (3.96 sq mi)
- Elevation: 88 m (289 ft)

Population (2006-12-31)
  - Total: 1,229
  - Density: 119.8/km^{2} (310.2/sq mi)
- Time zone: UTC+01:00 (CET)
  - Summer (DST): UTC+02:00 (CEST)
- Postal codes: 06388
- Dialling codes: 034976

Edderitz is a village and a former municipality in the district of Anhalt-Bitterfeld, in Saxony-Anhalt, Germany. Since 1 January 2010, it is part of the town Südliches Anhalt.
