= Görzig =

- Stadtteil of Südliches Anhalt
- Interactive map of Görzig
- Location within Germany Location within Saxony-Anhalt
- Coordinates: 51°40′N 12°0′E
- Country: Germany
- State: Saxony-Anhalt
- District: Anhalt-Bitterfeld
- Town: Südliches Anhalt

Area
  - Total: 11.82 km^{2} (4.56 sq mi)
- Elevation: 84 m (276 ft)

Population (2009-12-31)
  - Total: 1,241
  - Density: 105.0/km^{2} (271.9/sq mi)
- Time zone: UTC+01:00 (CET)
  - Summer (DST): UTC+02:00 (CEST)
- Postal codes: 06369
- Dialling codes: 034975
- Vehicle registration: ABI
- Website: suedliches-anhalt.de/goerzig

Görzig (German pronunciation: [ˈɡœʁtsɪç]) is a village and a former municipality in the district of Anhalt-Bitterfeld, in Saxony-Anhalt, Germany. Since 1 September 2010, it is part of the town Südliches Anhalt.
