= Wieskau =

- Stadtteil of Südliches Anhalt
- Interactive map of Wieskau
- Location within Germany Location within Saxony-Anhalt
- Coordinates: 51°39′N 11°56′E
- Country: Germany
- State: Saxony-Anhalt
- District: Anhalt-Bitterfeld
- Town: Südliches Anhalt

Area
  - Total: 6.8 km^{2} (2.6 sq mi)
- Elevation: 74 m (243 ft)

Population (2006-12-31)
  - Total: 314
  - Density: 46/km^{2} (120/sq mi)
- Time zone: UTC+01:00 (CET)
  - Summer (DST): UTC+02:00 (CEST)
- Postal codes: 06388
- Dialling codes: 034976

Wieskau (German pronunciation: [ˈviːskaʊ]) is a village and a former municipality in the district of Anhalt-Bitterfeld, in Saxony-Anhalt, Germany.

Since 1 January 2010, it is part of the town Südliches Anhalt.
