= Tornau =

Tornau can refer to:

- Tornau, Wittenberg, a municipality in the district of Wittenberg, Saxony-Anhalt, Germany
- Tornau vor der Heide, a municipality in the district of Anhalt-Bitterfeld, Saxony-Anhalt, Germany
- the German name for the Turňa River, Slovakia
