= Fraßdorf =

- Stadtteil of Südliches Anhalt
- Interactive map of Fraßdorf
- Location within Germany Location within Saxony-Anhalt
- Coordinates: 51°44′N 12°7′E
- Country: Germany
- State: Saxony-Anhalt
- District: Anhalt-Bitterfeld
- Town: Südliches Anhalt

Area
  - Total: 2.69 km^{2} (1.04 sq mi)
- Elevation: 81 m (266 ft)

Population
  - Total: 191
  - Density: 71.0/km^{2} (184/sq mi)
- Time zone: UTC+01:00 (CET)
  - Summer (DST): UTC+02:00 (CEST)
- Postal codes: 06386
- Dialling codes: 034977
- Vehicle registration: ABI

Fraßdorf (German pronunciation: [ˈfʁaːsˌdɔʁf]) is a village and a former municipality in the district of Anhalt-Bitterfeld, in Saxony-Anhalt, Germany. Since 1 January 2010, it is part of the town Südliches Anhalt.
