= Prosigk =

- Stadtteil of Südliches Anhalt
- Interactive map of Prosigk
- Location within Germany Location within Saxony-Anhalt
- Coordinates: 51°42′N 12°3′E
- Country: Germany
- State: Saxony-Anhalt
- District: Anhalt-Bitterfeld
- Town: Südliches Anhalt

Area
  - Total: 15.08 km^{2} (5.82 sq mi)
- Elevation: 81 m (266 ft)

Population (2006-12-31)
  - Total: 752
  - Density: 49.9/km^{2} (129/sq mi)
- Time zone: UTC+01:00 (CET)
  - Summer (DST): UTC+02:00 (CEST)
- Postal codes: 06369
- Dialling codes: 034978
- Vehicle registration: ABI
- Website: www.suedliches-anhalt.de

Prosigk (German pronunciation: [ˈpʁoːzɪk]) is a village and a former municipality in the district of Anhalt-Bitterfeld, in Saxony-Anhalt, Germany. Prosigk is located 58.6 km away from the closest city of Leipzig, and 152 km away from its capital city in Berlin. It has an industrial and agricultural based economy. Since 1 January 2010, has been incorporated into the town of Südliches Anhalt. The village runs its own museum for the history of its fire brigade and several other services.
