= Altjeßnitz =

- Stadtteil of Raguhn-Jeßnitz
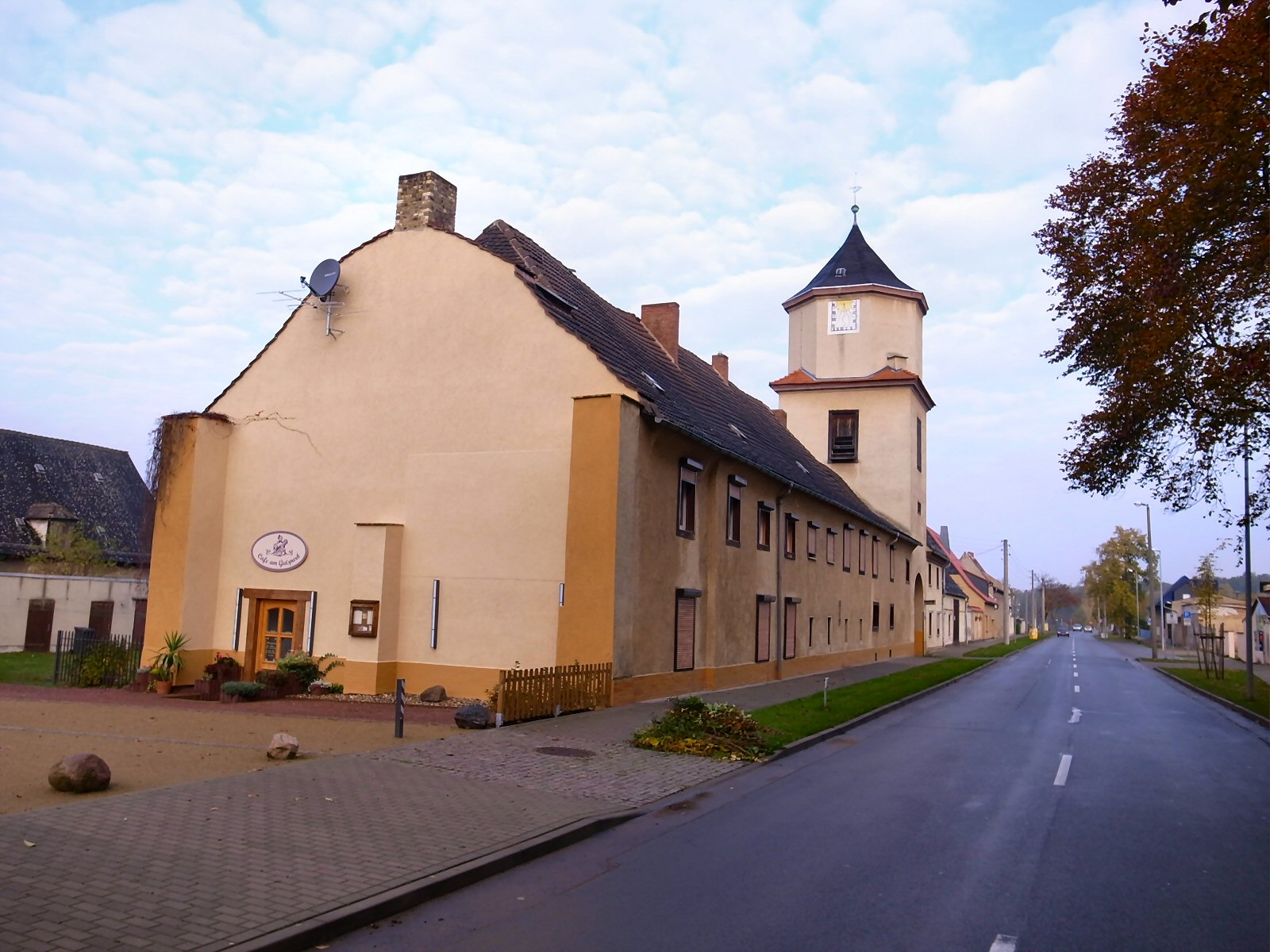

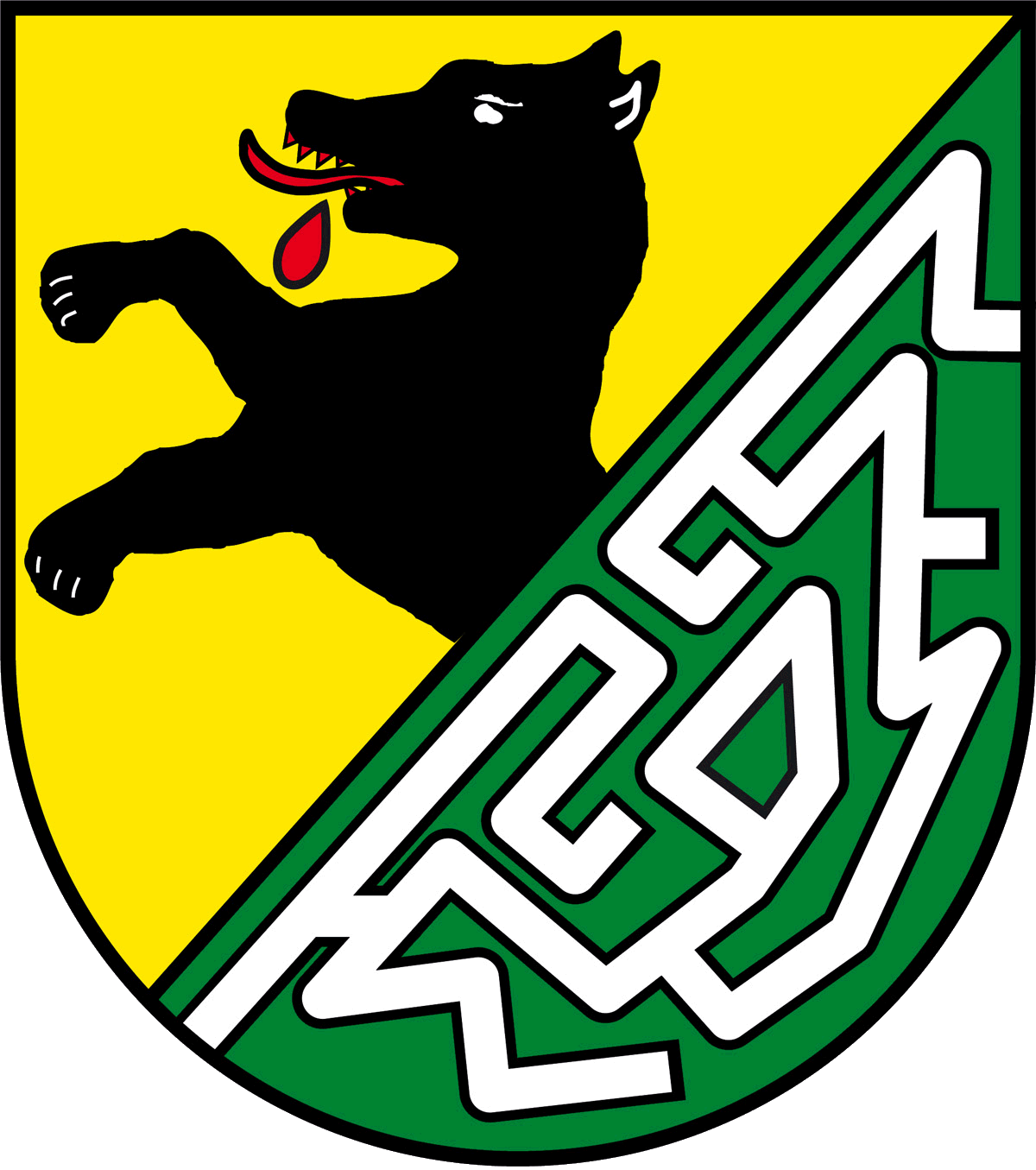
- Coat of arms
- Interactive map of Altjeßnitz
- Location within Germany Location within Saxony-Anhalt
- Coordinates: 51°41′26″N 12°19′19″E
- Country: Germany
- State: Saxony-Anhalt
- District: Anhalt-Bitterfeld
- Town: Raguhn-Jeßnitz

Area
  - Total: 6.42 km^{2} (2.48 sq mi)
- Elevation: 74 m (243 ft)

Population (2017)
  - Total: 390
  - Density: 61/km^{2} (160/sq mi)
- Time zone: UTC+01:00 (CET)
  - Summer (DST): UTC+02:00 (CEST)
- Postal codes: 06800
- Dialling codes: 03494
- Vehicle registration: ABI/BTF

Altjeßnitz (German pronunciation: [ˈaltˌjɛsnɪts], lit. 'Old Jeßnitz') is a village and a former municipality in the district of Anhalt-Bitterfeld, in Saxony-Anhalt, Germany. Since 1 January 2010, it is part of the town Raguhn-Jeßnitz.

https://gartentraeume-sachsen-anhalt.de/de/gartentraeume-parks/irrgarten-altjessnitz.html

https://www.raguhn-jessnitz.de/de/altjessnitz-ortsteile/wissenswertes-zur-ortschaft-altjessnitz.html
