= Zehbitz =

- Stadtteil of Südliches Anhalt
- Interactive map of Zehbitz
- Location within Germany Location within Saxony-Anhalt
- Coordinates: 51°41′N 12°08′E
- Country: Germany
- State: Saxony-Anhalt
- District: Anhalt-Bitterfeld
- Town: Südliches Anhalt

Area
  - Total: 10.98 km^{2} (4.24 sq mi)
- Elevation: 77 m (253 ft)

Population (2006-12-31)
  - Total: 374
  - Density: 34.1/km^{2} (88.2/sq mi)
- Time zone: UTC+01:00 (CET)
  - Summer (DST): UTC+02:00 (CEST)
- Postal codes: 06369
- Dialling codes: 034956

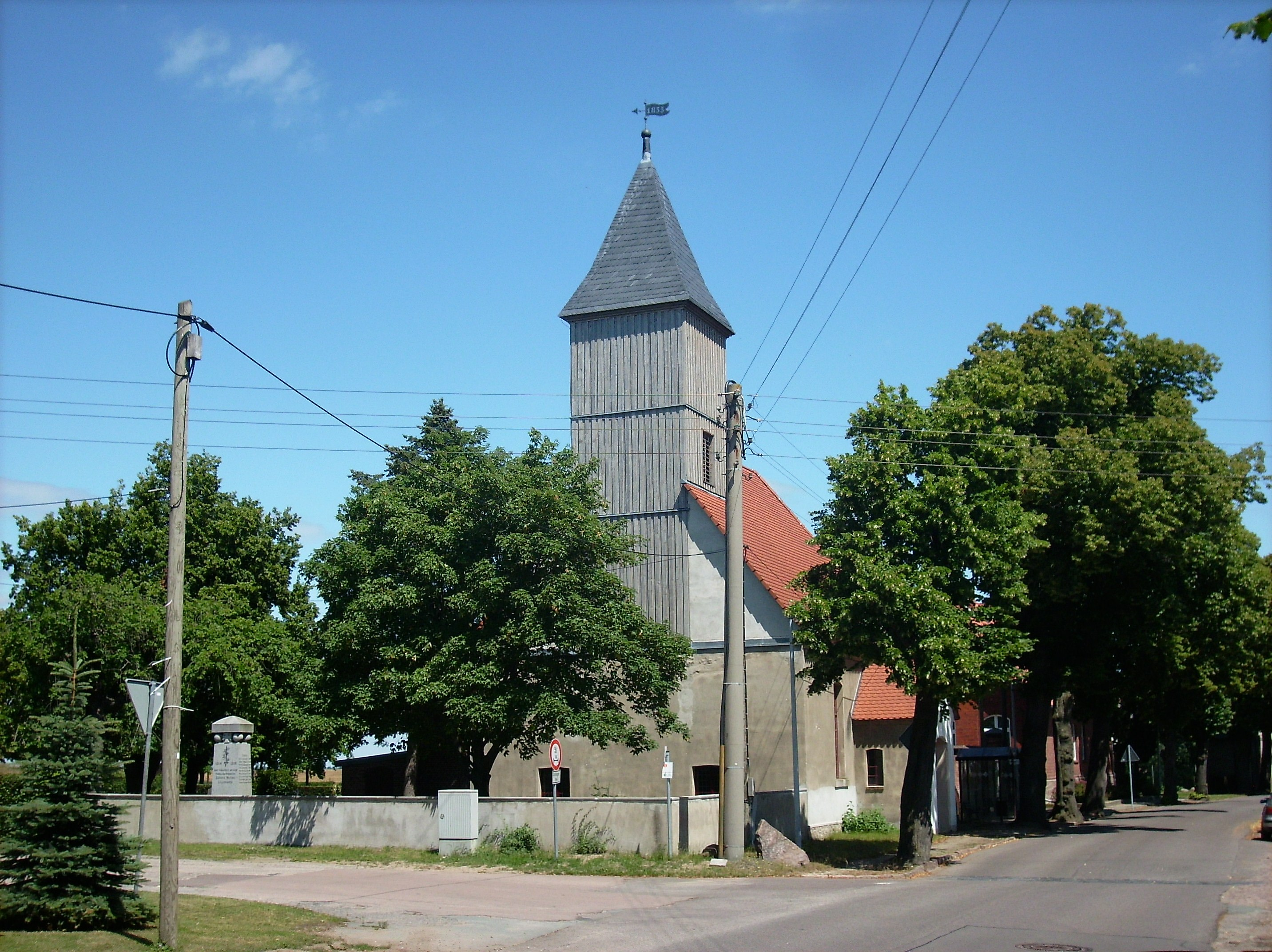

Zehbitz (German pronunciation: [ˈtseːbɪts]) is a village and a former municipality in the district of Anhalt-Bitterfeld, in Saxony-Anhalt, Germany.

Since 1 January 2010, it is part of the town Südliches Anhalt.
