= Retzau =

- Stadtteil of Raguhn-Jeßnitz
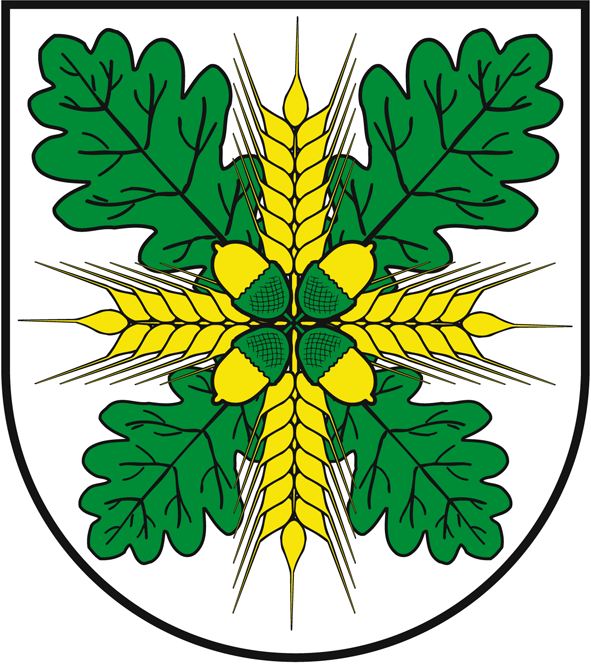
- Coat of arms
- Interactive map of Retzau
- Location within Germany Location within Saxony-Anhalt
- Coordinates: 51°44′N 12°19′E
- Country: Germany
- State: Saxony-Anhalt
- District: Anhalt-Bitterfeld
- Town: Raguhn-Jeßnitz

Area
  - Total: 4.59 km^{2} (1.77 sq mi)
- Elevation: 80 m (260 ft)

Population (2006-12-31)
  - Total: 389
  - Density: 84.7/km^{2} (220/sq mi)
- Time zone: UTC+01:00 (CET)
  - Summer (DST): UTC+02:00 (CEST)
- Postal codes: 06779
- Dialling codes: 034906

Retzau (German pronunciation: [ˈʁɛtsaʊ]) is a village and a former municipality in the district of Anhalt-Bitterfeld, in Saxony-Anhalt, Germany. Since 1 January 2010, it is part of the town Raguhn-Jeßnitz.
