= Raguhn =

Town in Saxony-Anhalt, Germany

- Stadtteil of Raguhn-Jeßnitz
- Coat of arms
- Interactive map of Raguhn
- Location within Germany Location within Saxony-Anhalt
- Coordinates: 51°42′41″N 12°16′59″E
- Country: Germany
- State: Saxony-Anhalt
- District: Anhalt-Bitterfeld
- Town: Raguhn-Jeßnitz

Area
  - Total: 15.24 km^{2} (5.88 sq mi)
- Elevation: 90 m (300 ft)

Population (2006-12-31)
  - Total: 3,696
  - Density: 242.5/km^{2} (628.1/sq mi)
- Time zone: UTC+01:00 (CET)
  - Summer (DST): UTC+02:00 (CEST)
- Postal codes: 06779
- Dialling codes: 034906
- Vehicle registration: ABI

Raguhn (German pronunciation: [ʁaˈɡuːn]) is a town and a former municipality in the district of Anhalt-Bitterfeld, Saxony-Anhalt, Germany. It is situated on the left bank of the Mulde, approximately 10 kilometres (6.2 mi) northwest of Bitterfeld and 14 kilometres (8.7 mi) south of Dessau. Since 1 January 2010, it has been part of the town Raguhn-Jeßnitz.
