= Maasdorf =

- Stadtteil of Südliches Anhalt
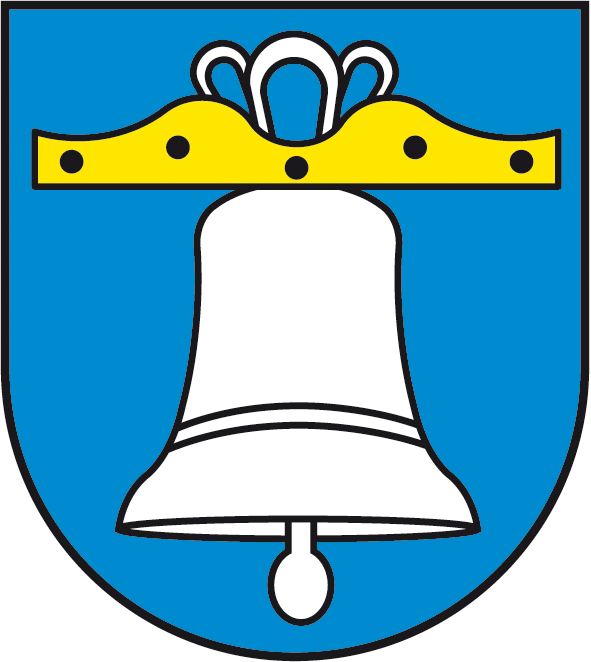
- Coat of arms
- Interactive map of Maasdorf
- Location within Germany Location within Saxony-Anhalt
- Coordinates: 51°41′N 11°58′E
- Country: Germany
- State: Saxony-Anhalt
- District: Anhalt-Bitterfeld
- Town: Südliches Anhalt

Area
  - Total: 4.34 km^{2} (1.68 sq mi)
- Elevation: 85 m (279 ft)

Population (2006-12-31)
  - Total: 378
  - Density: 87.1/km^{2} (226/sq mi)
- Time zone: UTC+01:00 (CET)
  - Summer (DST): UTC+02:00 (CEST)
- Postal codes: 06388
- Dialling codes: 034975

Maasdorf (German pronunciation: [ˈmaːsˌdɔʁf]) is a village and a former municipality in the district of Anhalt-Bitterfeld, in Saxony-Anhalt, Germany.

Since 1 January 2010, it is part of the town Südliches Anhalt.
