= Jeßnitz =

Town in Saxony-Anhalt, Germany

- Stadtteil of Raguhn-Jeßnitz
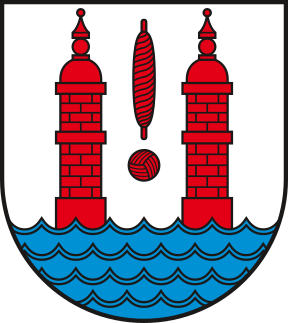
- Coat of arms
- Interactive map of Jeßnitz
- Location within Germany Location within Saxony-Anhalt
- Coordinates: 51°41′N 12°18′E
- Country: Germany
- State: Saxony-Anhalt
- District: Anhalt-Bitterfeld
- Town: Raguhn-Jeßnitz

Area
  - Total: 14.25 km^{2} (5.50 sq mi)
- Elevation: 71 m (233 ft)

Population (2006-12-31)
  - Total: 3,681
  - Density: 258.3/km^{2} (669.0/sq mi)
- Time zone: UTC+01:00 (CET)
  - Summer (DST): UTC+02:00 (CEST)
- Postal codes: 06800
- Dialling codes: 03494
- Vehicle registration: ABI
- Website: raguhn-jessnitz.de

Jeßnitz (German pronunciation: [ˈjɛsnɪts]) is a town and a former municipality in the district of Anhalt-Bitterfeld, in Saxony-Anhalt, Germany. It is situated on the river Mulde, north of Bitterfeld. Since 1 January 2010, it is part of the town Raguhn-Jeßnitz.
