= Hannes Loth =

German politician (born 1981)

Member of the Landtag of Saxony-Anhalt
- In office 12 April 2016 – 5 September 2023
- Succeeded by: Christian Mertens

Personal details
- Born: 3 June 1981 (age 45) Wolfen
- Party: Alternative for Germany (since 2013)

Hannes Loth (born 3 June 1981 in Wolfen) is a German politician serving as mayor of Raguhn-Jeßnitz since 2023. From 2016 to 2023, he was a member of the Landtag of Saxony-Anhalt.
