= Marke, Germany =

Marke
- Stadtteil of Raguhn-Jeßnitz
- Coat of arms
- Interactive map of Marke
- Location within Germany Location within Saxony-Anhalt
- Coordinates: 51°44′N 12°15′E
- Country: Germany
- State: Saxony-Anhalt
- District: Anhalt-Bitterfeld
- Town: Raguhn-Jeßnitz

Area
  - Total: 5.23 km^{2} (2.02 sq mi)
- Elevation: 82 m (269 ft)

Population (2006-12-31)
  - Total: 396
  - Density: 75.7/km^{2} (196/sq mi)
- Time zone: UTC+01:00 (CET)
  - Summer (DST): UTC+02:00 (CEST)
- Postal codes: 06779
- Dialling codes: 034906
- Vehicle registration: ABI

Marke (German pronunciation: [ˈmaʁkə]) is a village and a former municipality in the district of Anhalt-Bitterfeld, in Saxony-Anhalt, Germany. Since 1 January 2010, it is part of the town Raguhn-Jeßnitz.
