= Christian Mertens =

German politician (born 1991)

Member of the Landtag of Saxony-Anhalt
- Incumbent
- Assumed office 5 September 2023
- Preceded by: Hannes Loth
- Constituency: Magdeburg III (since 2026)

Personal details
- Born: 15 February 1991 (age 35)
- Party: Alternative for Germany (since 2015)

Christian Mertens (born 15 February 1991) is a German politician serving as a member of the Landtag of Saxony-Anhalt since 2023. From 2021 to 2025, he served as chairman of the Young Alternative for Germany in Saxony-Anhalt.
