= Gröbzig =

- Stadtteil of Südliches Anhalt
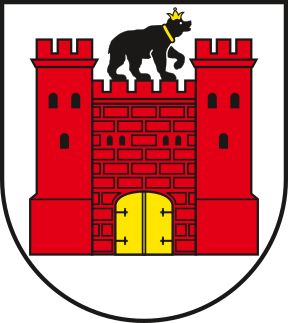
- Coat of arms
- Interactive map of Gröbzig
- Location within Germany Location within Saxony-Anhalt
- Coordinates: 51°40′N 11°52′E
- Country: Germany
- State: Saxony-Anhalt
- District: Anhalt-Bitterfeld
- Town: Südliches Anhalt

Area
  - Total: 24.23 km^{2} (9.36 sq mi)
- Elevation: 77 m (253 ft)

Population (2009-12-31)
  - Total: 3,034
  - Density: 125.2/km^{2} (324.3/sq mi)
- Time zone: UTC+01:00 (CET)
  - Summer (DST): UTC+02:00 (CEST)
- Postal codes: 06388
- Dialling codes: 034976
- Vehicle registration: ABI
- Website: suedliches-anhalt.de/groebzig

Gröbzig (German pronunciation: [ˈɡrøːptsɪç]) is a town and a former municipality in the district of Anhalt-Bitterfeld, in Saxony-Anhalt, Germany. Since 1 September 2010, it is part of the town Südliches Anhalt.

It is situated southwest of the district capital of Köthen (Anhalt).
