= Raguhn-Jeßnitz =

- Town
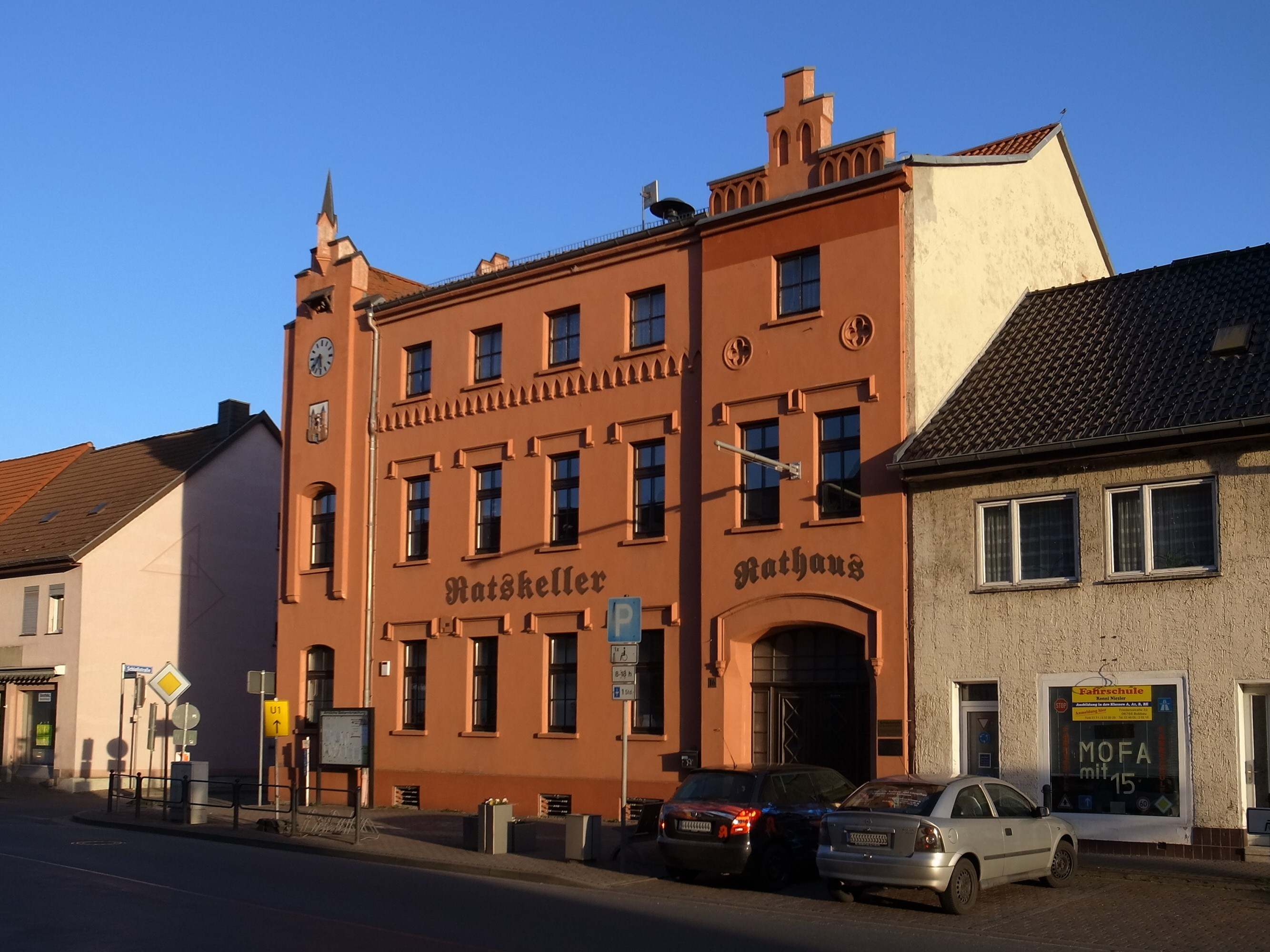
- Town hall

- Coat of arms

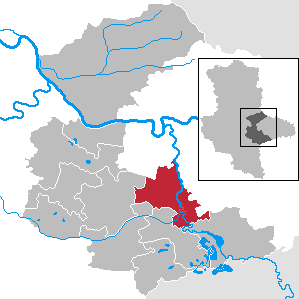
- Location of Raguhn-Jeßnitz within Anhalt-Bitterfeld district
- Interactive map of Raguhn-Jeßnitz
- Location within Germany Location within Saxony-Anhalt
- Coordinates: 51°40′N 12°4′E
- Country: Germany
- State: Saxony-Anhalt
- District: Anhalt-Bitterfeld

Government
  - Mayor (2023–30): Hannes Loth (AfD)

Area
  - Total: 97.13 km^{2} (37.50 sq mi)
- Elevation: 76 m (249 ft)

Population (2025-12-31)
  - Total: 8,614
  - Density: 88.69/km^{2} (229.7/sq mi)
- Time zone: UTC+01:00 (CET)
  - Summer (DST): UTC+02:00 (CEST)
- Postal codes: 06779, 06800
- Dialling codes: 034906, 03494
- Vehicle registration: ABI
- Website: www.raguhn-jessnitz.de

Raguhn-Jeßnitz (German pronunciation: [ʁaˈɡuːn ˈjɛsnɪts]) is a town in the district of Anhalt-Bitterfeld, in Saxony-Anhalt, Germany. It was formed on 1 January 2010 by the merger of the former municipalities Altjeßnitz, Jeßnitz, Marke, Raguhn, Retzau, Schierau, Thurland and Tornau vor der Heide. These 8 former municipalities are now Ortschaften or municipal divisions of the town Raguhn-Jeßnitz.

== History ==
During World War II, Raguhn was the location of a subcamp of the Buchenwald concentration camp, in which some 500 women and girls were imprisoned and subjected to forced labour. The prisoners were almost exclusively Jewish, but there was also one non-Jewish American, Hungarian, Italian and Turkish woman each.

== Politics ==
The first round of the mayoral elections for the town were held on 18 June 2023 with the candidate from the far-right AfD Hannes Loth receiving 40.7% of the vote, more than any other candidate. His main rival was the independent Nils Naumann who managed to get 36.9% of the vote. Hannes Loth won with 51.13% of the vote in a second run-off round on 2 July 2023 despite the fact that his party is under the surveillance of the State Office for the Protection of the Constitution of the State of Saxony-Anhalt.

He became the first AfD mayor in Germany.
