= Schierau =

- Stadtteil of Raguhn-Jeßnitz
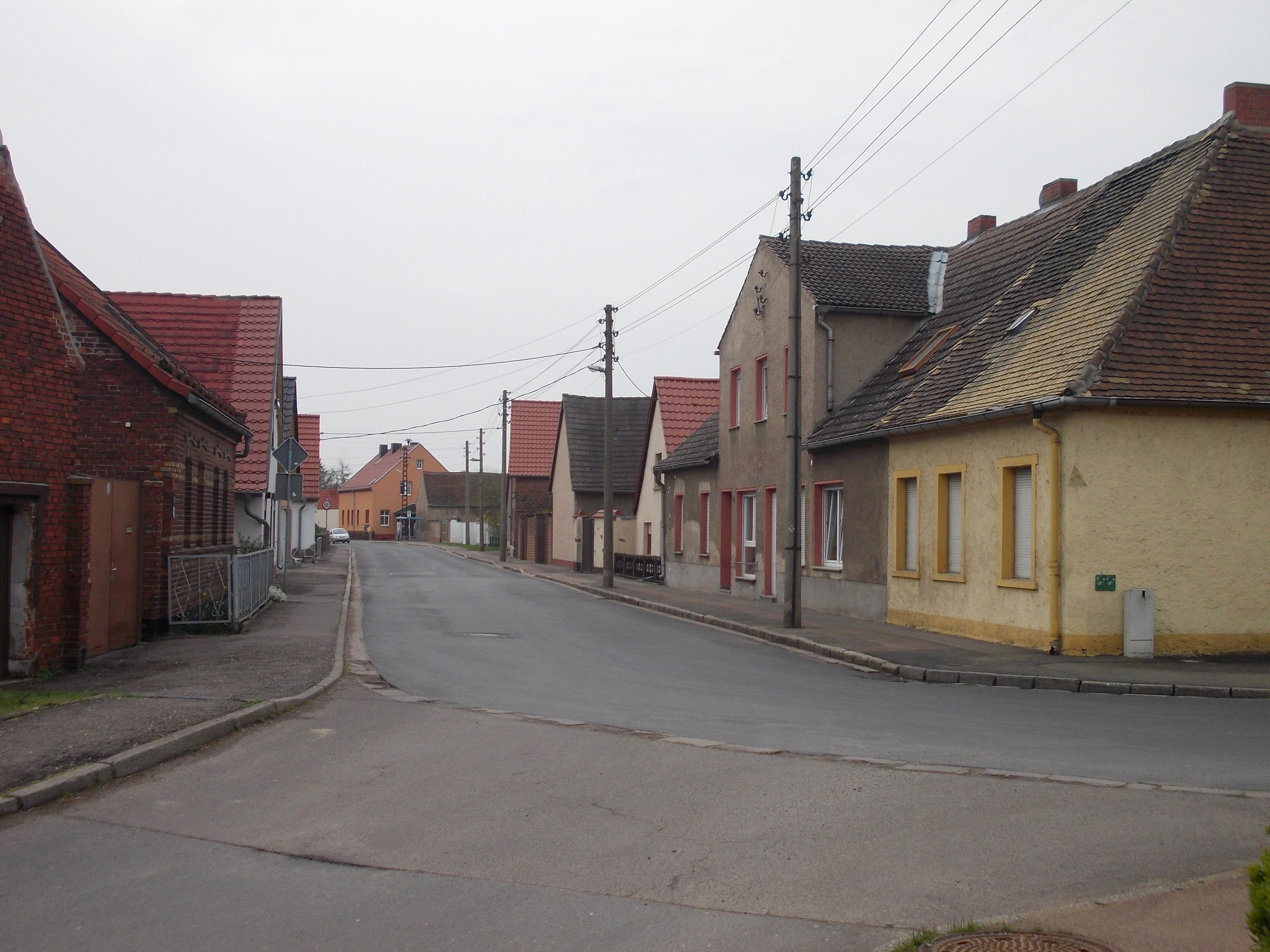

- Coat of arms
- Interactive map of Schierau
- Location within Germany Location within Saxony-Anhalt
- Coordinates: 51°45′N 12°17′E
- Country: Germany
- State: Saxony-Anhalt
- District: Anhalt-Bitterfeld
- Town: Raguhn-Jeßnitz

Area
  - Total: 29.82 km^{2} (11.51 sq mi)
- Elevation: 65 m (213 ft)

Population (2006-12-31)
  - Total: 839
  - Density: 28.1/km^{2} (72.9/sq mi)
- Time zone: UTC+01:00 (CET)
  - Summer (DST): UTC+02:00 (CEST)
- Postal codes: 06779
- Dialling codes: 034906

Schierau (German pronunciation: [ˈʃiːʁaʊ]) is a village and a former municipality in the district of Anhalt-Bitterfeld, in Saxony-Anhalt, Germany. Since 1 January 2010, it is part of the town Raguhn-Jeßnitz.
