= Bernburg (district) =

Coordinates: 51°50′N 11°45′E

- District
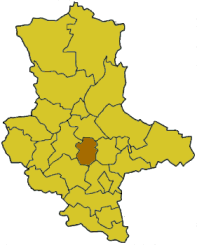
- Country: Germany
- State: Saxony-Anhalt
- Disbanded: 2007-07-01
- Capital: Bernburg

Area
  - Total: 414 km^{2} (160 sq mi)

Population (2001)
  - Total: 69,300
  - Density: 170/km^{2} (430/sq mi)
- Time zone: UTC+01:00 (CET)
  - Summer (DST): UTC+02:00 (CEST)
- Vehicle registration: BBG
- Website: landkreis-bernburg.de

Bernburg was a district in Saxony-Anhalt, Germany. It is bounded by (from the north and clockwise) the districts of Schönebeck, Köthen, Saalkreis, Mansfelder Land and Aschersleben-Staßfurt.

== History ==
There was an independent principality called Anhalt-Bernburg following the subdivision of the principality of Anhalt in 1603. This mini state was elevated to the rank of a duchy in 1806, and merged once more with the other parts to form a united duchy of Anhalt again in 1863.

== Geography ==
The small district of Bernburg is located in the historical region of Anhalt. The Saale River crosses the district from south to north.

== Coat of arms ==
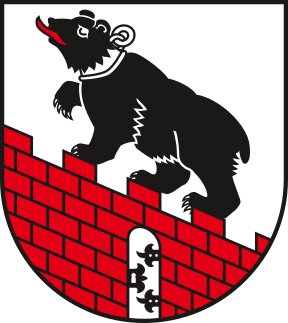

The arms display a bear walking on a red wall. The bear is the heraldic animal of Bernburg and Anhalt. The arms are similar to the old arms of the medieval state of Anhalt-Bernburg and the Free State of Anhalt within the Weimar Republic.

== Towns and municipalities ==
Towns
1. Könnern
Verwaltungsgemeinschaften
1. Bernburg (incl. town Bernburg)
2. Nienburg (incl. town Nienburg)
3. Saale-Wipper (incl. towns Alsleben and Güsten)
