= Thurland =

- Stadtteil of Raguhn-Jeßnitz
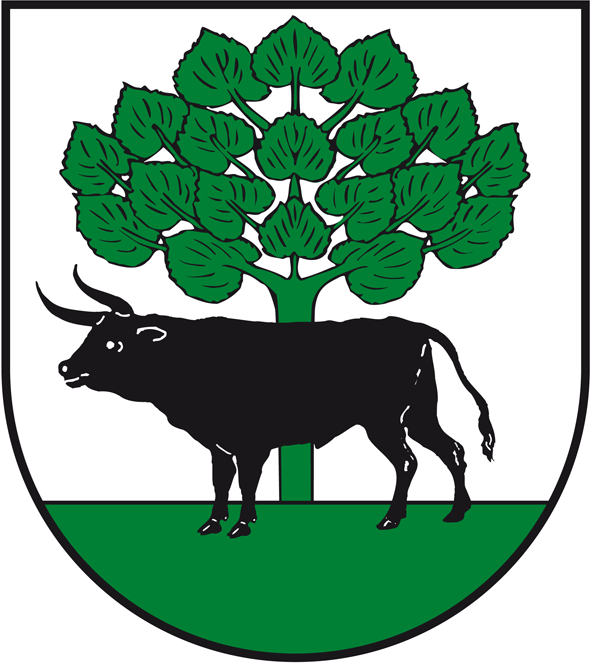
- Coat of arms
- Interactive map of Thurland
- Location within Germany Location within Saxony-Anhalt
- Coordinates: 51°43′N 12°13′E
- Country: Germany
- State: Saxony-Anhalt
- District: Anhalt-Bitterfeld
- Town: Raguhn-Jeßnitz

Area
  - Total: 6.75 km^{2} (2.61 sq mi)
- Elevation: 84 m (276 ft)

Population (2006-12-31)
  - Total: 434
  - Density: 64.3/km^{2} (167/sq mi)
- Time zone: UTC+01:00 (CET)
  - Summer (DST): UTC+02:00 (CEST)
- Postal codes: 06779
- Dialling codes: 034906
- Vehicle registration: ABI

Thurland (German pronunciation: [ˈtuːɐ̯lant]) is a village and a former municipality in the district of Anhalt-Bitterfeld, in Saxony-Anhalt, Germany. Since 1 January 2010, it is part of the town Raguhn-Jeßnitz.
