= Tornau vor der Heide =

- Stadtteil of Raguhn-Jeßnitz
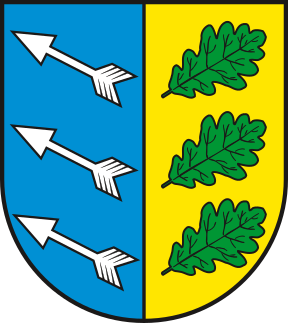
- Coat of arms
- Interactive map of Tornau vor der Heide
- Location within Germany Location within Saxony-Anhalt
- Coordinates: 51°43′N 12°11′E
- Country: Germany
- State: Saxony-Anhalt
- District: Anhalt-Bitterfeld
- Town: Raguhn-Jeßnitz

Area
  - Total: 6.75 km^{2} (2.61 sq mi)
- Elevation: 84 m (276 ft)

Population (2006-12-31)
  - Total: 490
  - Density: 73/km^{2} (190/sq mi)
- Time zone: UTC+01:00 (CET)
  - Summer (DST): UTC+02:00 (CEST)
- Postal codes: 06779
- Dialling codes: 034906

Tornau vor der Heide (German pronunciation: [ˈtɔʁnaʊ foːɐ̯ deːɐ̯ ˈhaɪdə], lit. 'Tornau before the Heath') is a village and a former municipality in the district of Anhalt-Bitterfeld, in Saxony-Anhalt, Germany.

Since 1 January 2010, it is part of the town Raguhn-Jeßnitz.

Tornau vor der Heide is situated between Dessau-Roßlau and Halle (Saale), on the edge of the Middle Elbe Biosphere Reserve.

Tornau vor der Heide was first mentioned in historical records in the 13th century.

On January 1, 2010, the previously independent municipalities of Tornau vor der Heide, Marke, Retzau, Schierau, Thurland, and Altjeßnitz, along with the towns of Jeßnitz (Anhalt) and Raguhn, merged to form the town of Raguhn-Jeßnitz.

At the same time, the Raguhn administrative association, to which Tornau vor der Heide had belonged, was dissolved.

The last mayor of the municipality of Tornau vor der Heide was Lothar Krause.
