= Südliches Anhalt =

- Town
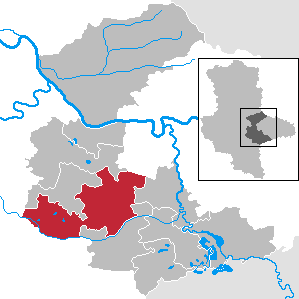
- Location of Südliches Anhalt within Anhalt-Bitterfeld district
- Interactive map of Südliches Anhalt
- Location within Germany Location within Saxony-Anhalt
- Coordinates: 51°40′N 12°4′E
- Country: Germany
- State: Saxony-Anhalt
- District: Anhalt-Bitterfeld

Government
  - Mayor (2023–30): Thomas Schneider

Area
  - Total: 191.54 km^{2} (73.95 sq mi)
- Elevation: 80 m (260 ft)

Population (2025-12-31)
  - Total: 12,778
  - Density: 66.712/km^{2} (172.78/sq mi)
- Time zone: UTC+01:00 (CET)
  - Summer (DST): UTC+02:00 (CEST)
- Postal codes: 06369, 06386, 06388
- Dialling codes: 03496, 034975, 034976, 034977, 034978
- Vehicle registration: ABI
- Website: www.suedliches-anhalt.de

Südliches Anhalt (German pronunciation: [ˌzyːtlɪçəs ˈʔanhalt], lit. 'Southern Anhalt') is a town in the district of Anhalt-Bitterfeld, in Saxony-Anhalt, Germany. It was formed on 1 January 2010 by the merger of the former municipalities Edderitz, Fraßdorf, Glauzig, Großbadegast, Hinsdorf, Libehna, Maasdorf, Meilendorf, Prosigk, Quellendorf, Radegast, Reupzig, Riesdorf, Scheuder, Trebbichau an der Fuhne, Weißandt-Gölzau, Wieskau, and Zehbitz. On 1 September 2010, the former municipalities Gröbzig, Görzig, and Piethen joined the town.

== Geography ==
The town Südliches Anhalt consists of the following Ortschaften or municipal divisions:

- Edderitz
- Fraßdorf
- Glauzig
- Görzig
- Gröbzig
- Großbadegast
- Hinsdorf
- Libehna
- Maasdorf
- Meilendorf
- Piethen
- Prosigk
- Quellendorf
- Radegast
- Reinsdorf
- Reupzig
- Riesdorf
- Scheuder
- Trebbichau an der Fuhne
- Weißandt-Gölzau
- Werdershausen
- Wieskau
- Wörbzig
- Zehbitz
