= Anhalt-Bitterfeld =

Coordinates: 51°43′N 12°4′E

- District
- Flag Coat of arms
- Country: Germany
- State: Saxony-Anhalt
- Capital: Köthen (Anhalt)

Government
  - District admin.: Andy Grabner (CDU)

Area
  - Total: 1,455.1 km^{2} (561.8 sq mi)

Population (31 December 2024)
  - Total: 153,035
  - Density: 105.17/km^{2} (272.39/sq mi)
- Time zone: UTC+01:00 (CET)
  - Summer (DST): UTC+02:00 (CEST)
- Vehicle registration: ABI, AZE, BTF, KÖT, ZE
- Website: www.anhalt-bitterfeld.de

Anhalt-Bitterfeld is a district in Saxony-Anhalt, Germany. Its capital is Köthen (Anhalt). Its area is 1,455.1 km^{2} (561.8 sq mi).

== History ==
This district was established by merging the former districts of Bitterfeld, Köthen and a large part of Anhalt-Zerbst as part of the reform of 2007.

=== Former Verwaltungsgemeinschaft ===
- Osternienburg, disbanded in 2010.
- Raguhn, disbanded in 2010.

== Towns and municipalities ==
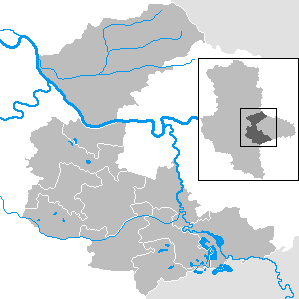
Clickable map of towns and municipalities in the district

The district Anhalt-Bitterfeld consists of the following subdivisions:

Towns
1. Aken (Elbe)
2. Bitterfeld-Wolfen
3. Köthen (Anhalt)
4. Raguhn-Jeßnitz
5. Sandersdorf-Brehna
6. Südliches Anhalt
7. Zerbst
8. Zörbig
Municipalities
1. Muldestausee
2. Osternienburger Land
