= Elbe-Ehle-Nuthe =

German municipality

- Former Verwaltungsgemeinschaft
- Interactive map of Elbe-Ehle-Nuthe
- Coordinates: 51°58′N 12°05′E
- Country: Germany
- State: Saxony-Anhalt
- District: Anhalt-Bitterfeld
- Disbanded: 1 January 2010
- Seat: Zerbst

Elbe-Ehle-Nuthe was a Verwaltungsgemeinschaft ("collective municipality") in the Anhalt-Bitterfeld district, in Saxony-Anhalt, Germany. It was situated on the right bank of the Elbe, around Zerbst, which was the seat of the Verwaltungsgemeinschaft, but not part of it. It was named after the three rivers Elbe, Ehle, and Nuthe, which flow through its territory.

It was disbanded on 1 January 2010 and absorbed into Zerbst.

The Verwaltungsgemeinschaft Elbe-Ehle-Nuthe consisted of the following municipalities:

1. Bornum
2. Buhlendorf
3. Deetz
4. Dobritz
5. Gehrden
6. Gödnitz
7. Grimme
8. Güterglück
9. Hohenlepte
10. Jütrichau
11. Leps
12. Lindau
13. Moritz
14. Nedlitz
15. Nutha
16. Polenzko
17. Reuden
18. Steutz
19. Straguth
20. Walternienburg
21. Zernitz
