= Hagendorf =

Hagendorf may refer to:

== Places ==
- Hagendorf, part of Traitsching, Bavaria, Germany
- Hagendorf, part of Waidhaus, Bavaria, Germany
- Hagendorf, part of Zerbst-Nedlitz, Saxony-Anhalt, Germany
- Hagendorf, part of Fallbach, Austria
- Hägendorf in Switzerland

== People with the surname ==
- Peter Hagendorf, German mercenary in the Thirty Years' War and diarist
