= Zerbst =

- Town
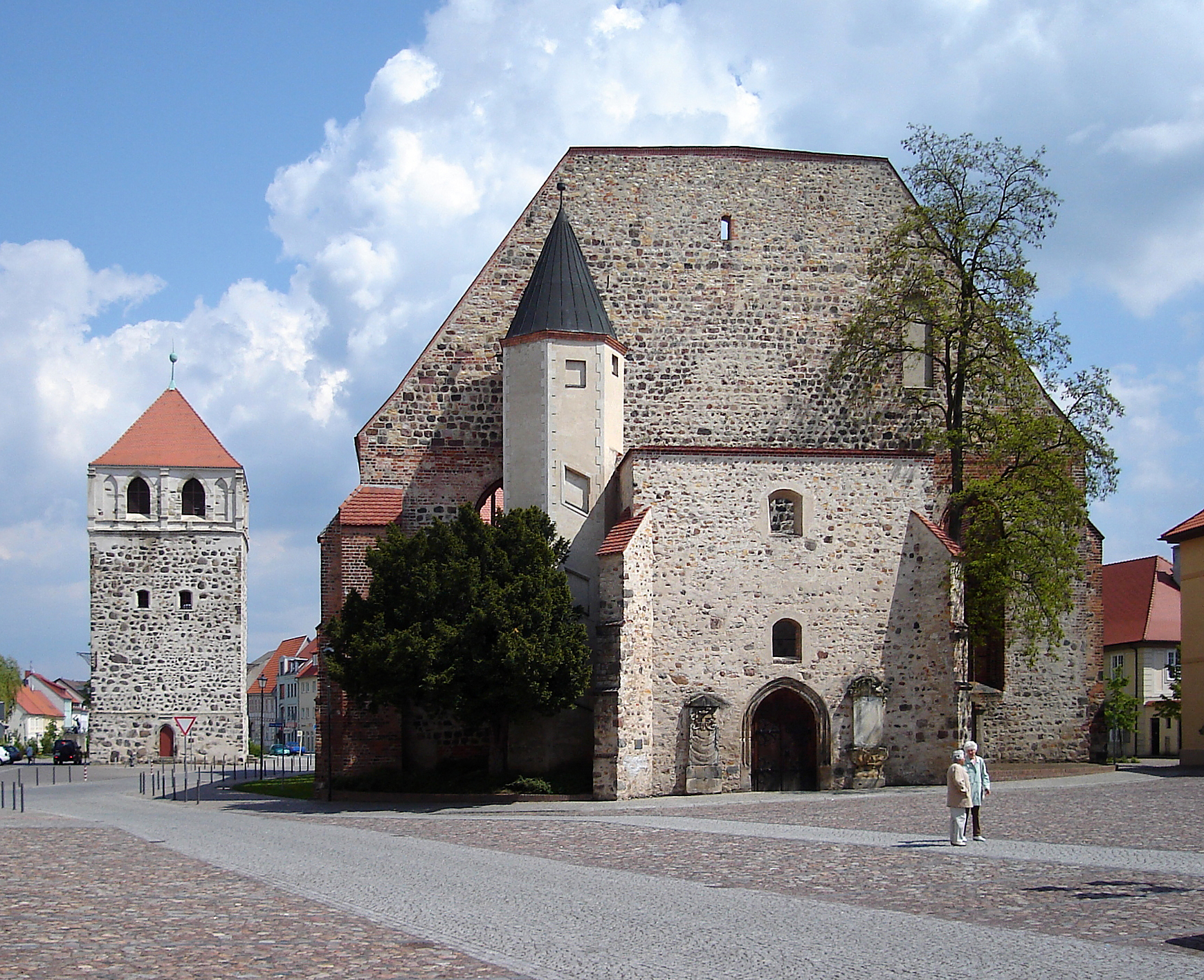
- St Bartholomew Church

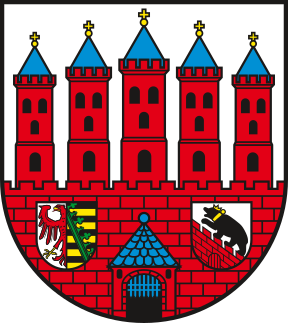
- Coat of arms

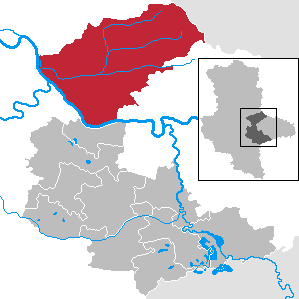
- Location of Zerbst within Anhalt-Bitterfeld district
- Interactive map of Zerbst
- Location within Germany Location within Saxony-Anhalt
- Coordinates: 51°58′5″N 12°5′4″E
- Country: Germany
- State: Saxony-Anhalt
- District: Anhalt-Bitterfeld

Government
  - Mayor (2019–26): Andreas Dittmann (SPD)

Area
  - Total: 468.5 km^{2} (180.9 sq mi)
- Elevation: 67 m (220 ft)

Population (2025-12-31)
  - Total: 20,779
  - Density: 44.35/km^{2} (114.9/sq mi)
- Time zone: UTC+01:00 (CET)
  - Summer (DST): UTC+02:00 (CEST)
- Postal codes: 39261
- Dialling codes: 03923
- Vehicle registration: ABI, AZE, BTF, KÖT, ZE
- Website: www.stadt-zerbst.de

Zerbst (German pronunciation: [ˈtsɛʁpst]) is a town in the district of Anhalt-Bitterfeld, in Saxony-Anhalt, Germany. Until an administrative reform in 2007, Zerbst was the capital of the former Anhalt-Zerbst district.

== Geography ==
Zerbst is situated in the Anhalt-Wittenberg region, with its town centre located on the river Nuthe about 13 km (8.1 mi) northeast of the Elbe, halfway between Magdeburg and Wittenberg.

With the 1 January 2010 local government reform, the 21 formerly independent communities of the disbanded Verwaltungsgemeinschaft (municipal association) Elbe-Ehle-Nuthe were incorporated into the town. Zerbst today counts about 24,000 inhabitants and, at 467.65 km^{2} (180.56 mi^{2}), is the fifth largest town in Germany by area. The current municipal area stretches from the Elbe in the southwest up to the Fläming Heath and the state border with Brandenburg in the northeast.

=== Divisions ===
The town Zerbst consists of Zerbst proper and the following 24 Ortschaften or municipal divisions:

- Bias
- Bornum
- Buhlendorf
- Deetz
- Dobritz
- Gehrden
- Gödnitz
- Grimme
- Güterglück
- Hohenlepte
- Jütrichau
- Leps
- Lindau
- Luso
- Moritz
- Nedlitz
- Nutha
- Polenzko
- Pulspforde
- Reuden
- Steutz
- Straguth
- Walternienburg
- Zernitz

== History ==
In the 8th century the area east of the Elbe was settled by Polabian Slavs (Lusatian Serbs), and the city was named Serbst after them, which evolved into Zerbst. Part of the border region with the adjacent Saxon region around Magdeburg in the west, it was incorporated into the Gau Ciervisti of the Saxon Eastern March (Marca Geronis) about 937 in the course of the German Ostsiedlung.

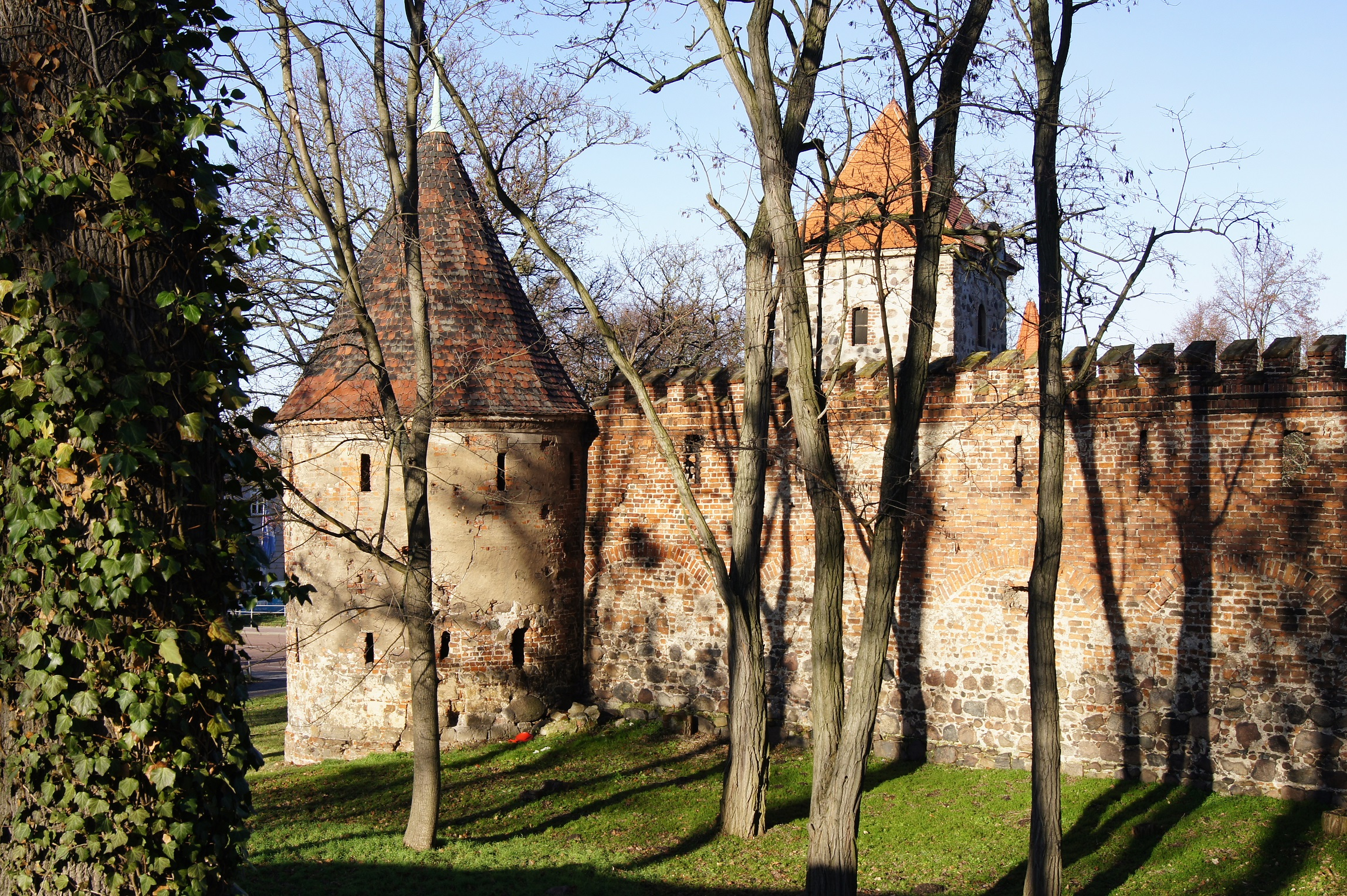
Town wall

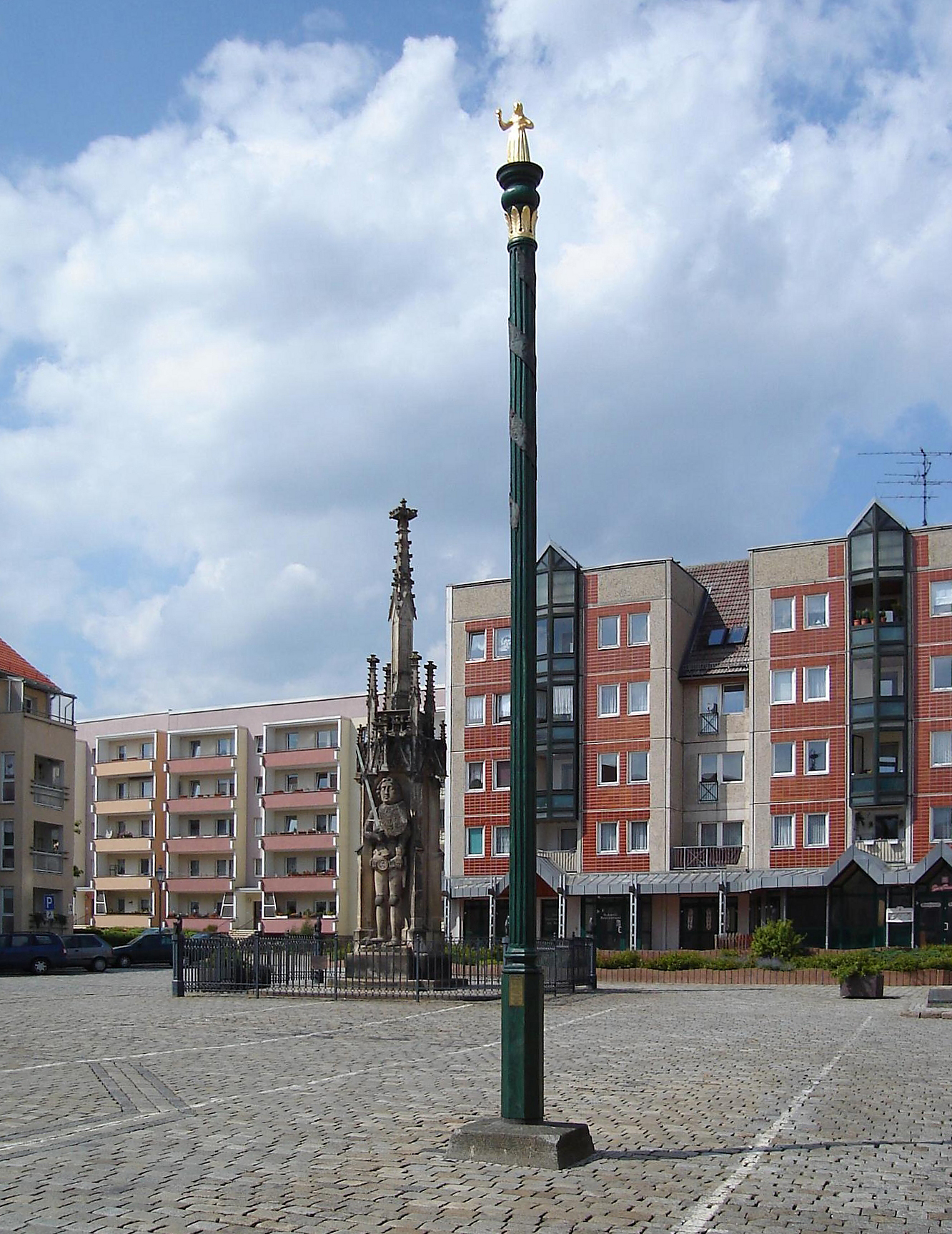
Market place

It is not clear when Zerbst was founded; however, the name Ciervisti mentioned as early as 949 may already refer to a fortified Slavic settlement. The chronicles by Prince-Bishop Thietmar of Merseburg recorded the first mention of a town as Zirwisti urbs in 1018, giving an account of the occupation by the Polish duke Bolesław I Chrobry during the German–Polish War with King Henry II in 1007. In the early 12th century the Ascanian ruler Albert the Bear had the fortress rebuilt, and the adjacent settlement was first fortified with town walls about 1250.

In 1307 Prince Albert I of Anhalt acquired the city of Zerbst from the Barby comital family, starting a centuries-long rule by the Ascanian princely House of Anhalt. His descendants continued to rule the Principality of Anhalt-Zerbst until in 1396 it was divided between Prince Sigismund I and his brother Albert IV, and the residence was moved to Dessau.

In 1375 Zerbster Bitterbier was first mentioned; by the Middle Ages the town had 600 breweries.

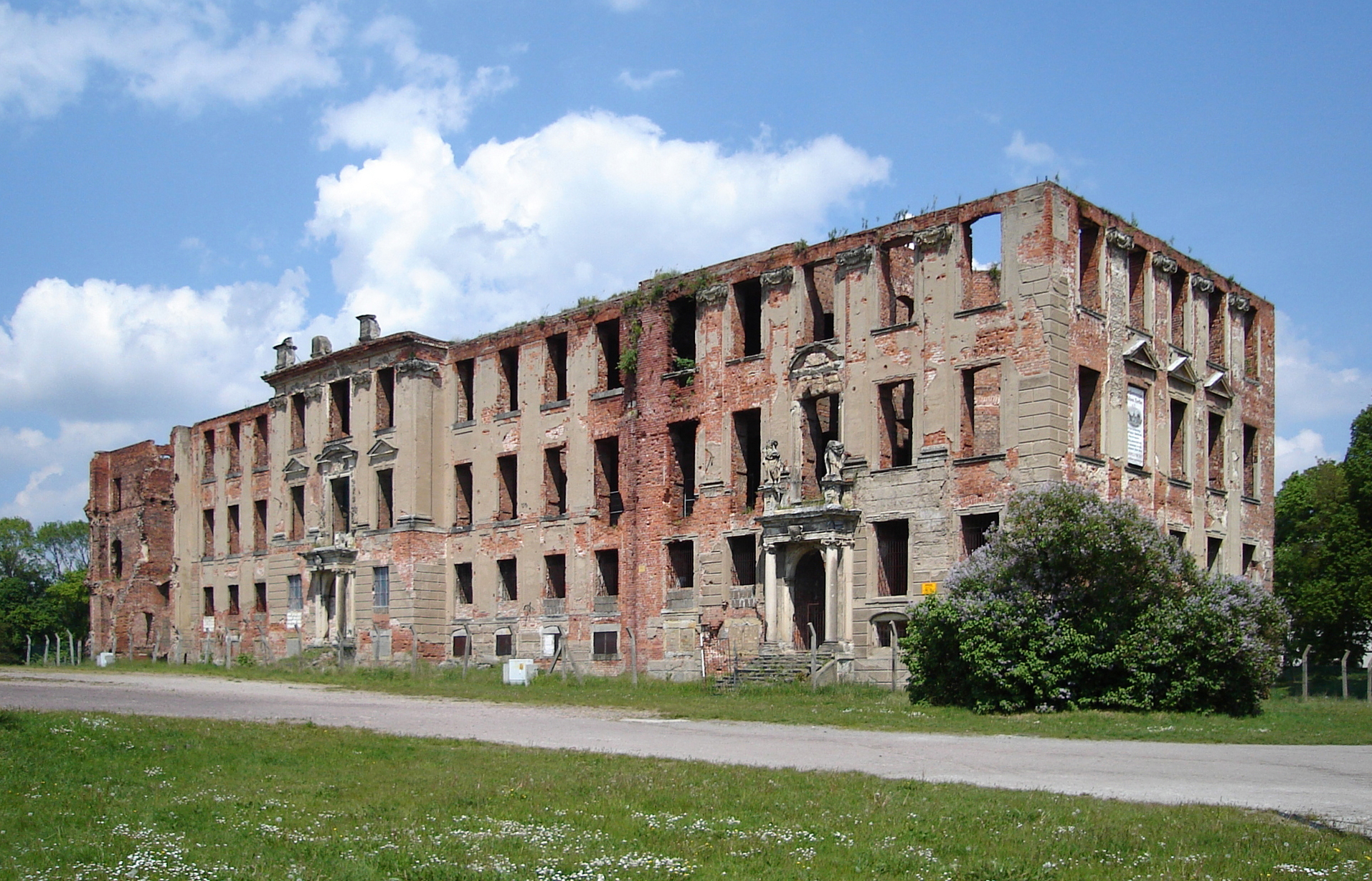
Ruins of Zerbst Castle

Following the Reformation Zerbst became a Calvinist centre. From 1582 to 1798 the Francisceum Gymnasium Illustre was an important Calvinist college. From 1603 to 1793 Zerbst again was the residence of the Anhalt-Zerbst princes, whose rule included among others also the Lordship of Jever in East Frisia. From 1722 to 1758, the Baroque composer Johann Friedrich Fasch resided there and was employed as a Hofkomponist and later Hofkapellmeister. To honour his memory, the Fasch Festivals have taken place in the city since 1983.

In 1745 Princess Sophie Auguste Friederike of Anhalt-Zerbst married Peter, Crown Prince of Russia, the heir apparent to the Russian throne. As Catherine II (the Great) she herself reigned as Empress of Russia from 9 July [O.S. 28 June] 1762 until 17 November [O.S. 6 November] 1796).

In 1797 Zerbst became a component of the Principality of Anhalt-Dessau.

From 1891 to 1928 a horse-drawn tram was operated in Zerbst, one of the longest surviving among such tram in Germany.

In the later part of the Second World War a Nazi labour camp was established on the edge of the military airfield, housing so-called "First-degree Hybrids" and "Jüdisch Versippte" (i.e., people with some Jewish blood, enough in Nazi terms to justify badly mistreating them but not killing them outright). 700 inmates from there were used for hard labour in road and airport construction as well as peat digging.

On 16 April 1945 – just a few weeks before the final surrender of Nazi Germany – some eighty percent of Zerbst was destroyed in an Allied air raid.

The old town was rebuilt in the following decades resulting in a fundamental change of the townscape, as only a few historical structures were preserved or reconstructed.

On 1 July 2006, the town of Zerbst was renamed Zerbst/Anhalt. A year later, on 1 July 2007, the town of Zerbst/Anhalt was incorporated together with several other municipalities of the Zerbst administrative district, creating the renewed Anhalt-Bitterfeld administrative district with its capital at Köthen.

== Local council ==
Elections in May 2014

CDU	Wählergruppen (Voters associations)	SPD	The Left	FDP	Alliance 90/The Greens	Total
10 Seats	10 Seats	5 Seats	5 Seats	4 Seats	2 Seats	36 Seats

== Mayors ==
- since July 2012: Andreas Dittmann (SPD)
- 1990-2012: Helmut Behrendt (FDP)

== Notable people ==
Catherine II (1780s)

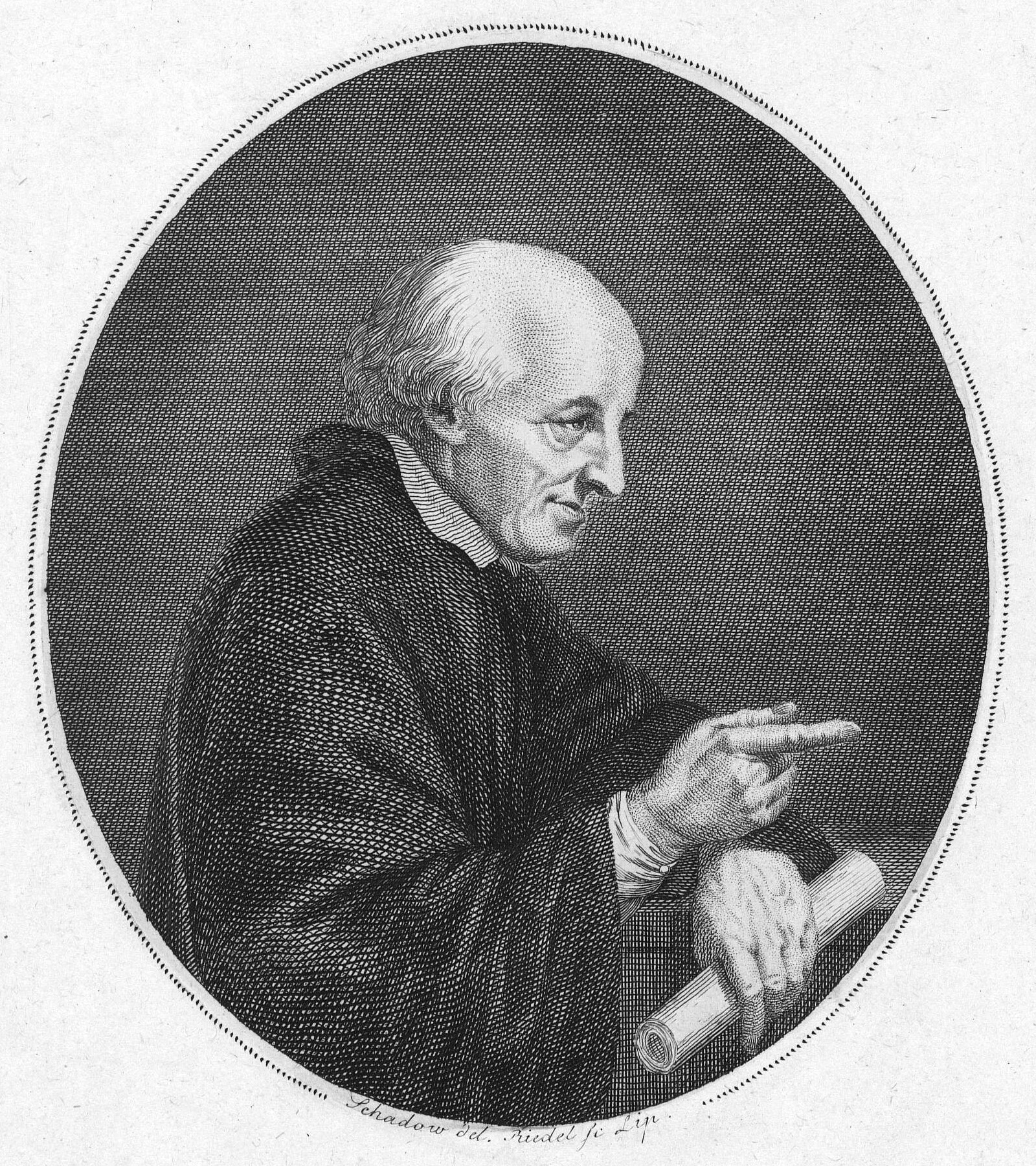
Carl Friedrich Christian Fasch 1769

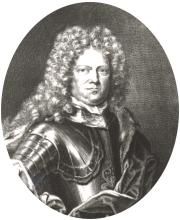
Charles, Prince of Anhalt Zerbst

- Uwe Ampler (born 1964), cyclist
- John Augustus, Prince of Anhalt-Zerbst (1677–1742), ruling prince
- Leopold Bürkner (1894–1975), Deputy Admiral in the Second World War, short-time head of protocol of the government of Karl Donitz in 1945
- Catherine the Great, (1729–1796), later Empress of Russia, lived at Zerbst Castle for some time
- Charles, Prince of Anhalt-Zerbst (1652–1718), ruling prince for 44 years
- Carl Friedrich Christian Fasch (1736–1800), composer and harpsichordist
- Johann Friedrich Fasch (1688–1758), composer
- Siegfried Fink (1928–2006), percussionist, composer and professor
- Peter Hagendorf, (exact life data unknown), mercenary in the Thirty Years' War, possibly born in Zerbst
- Jenny Hirsch (1829–1902), author and reformer
- Paul Kummer (1834–1912), minister, teacher, and scientist
- Bernhard Meyer (musician) (d.1713)
- Hermann Raster (1827–1891), editor and political figure
- Detlef Raugust (born 1954), footballer
- Heinrich Ritter (1791–1869), philosopher
- Ute Rührold (born 1954), luger
- Karl Ludwig Schröder (1877–1940), screenwriter and film agent
- Friedrich Joachim Stengel (1694–1787), architect

== See also ==
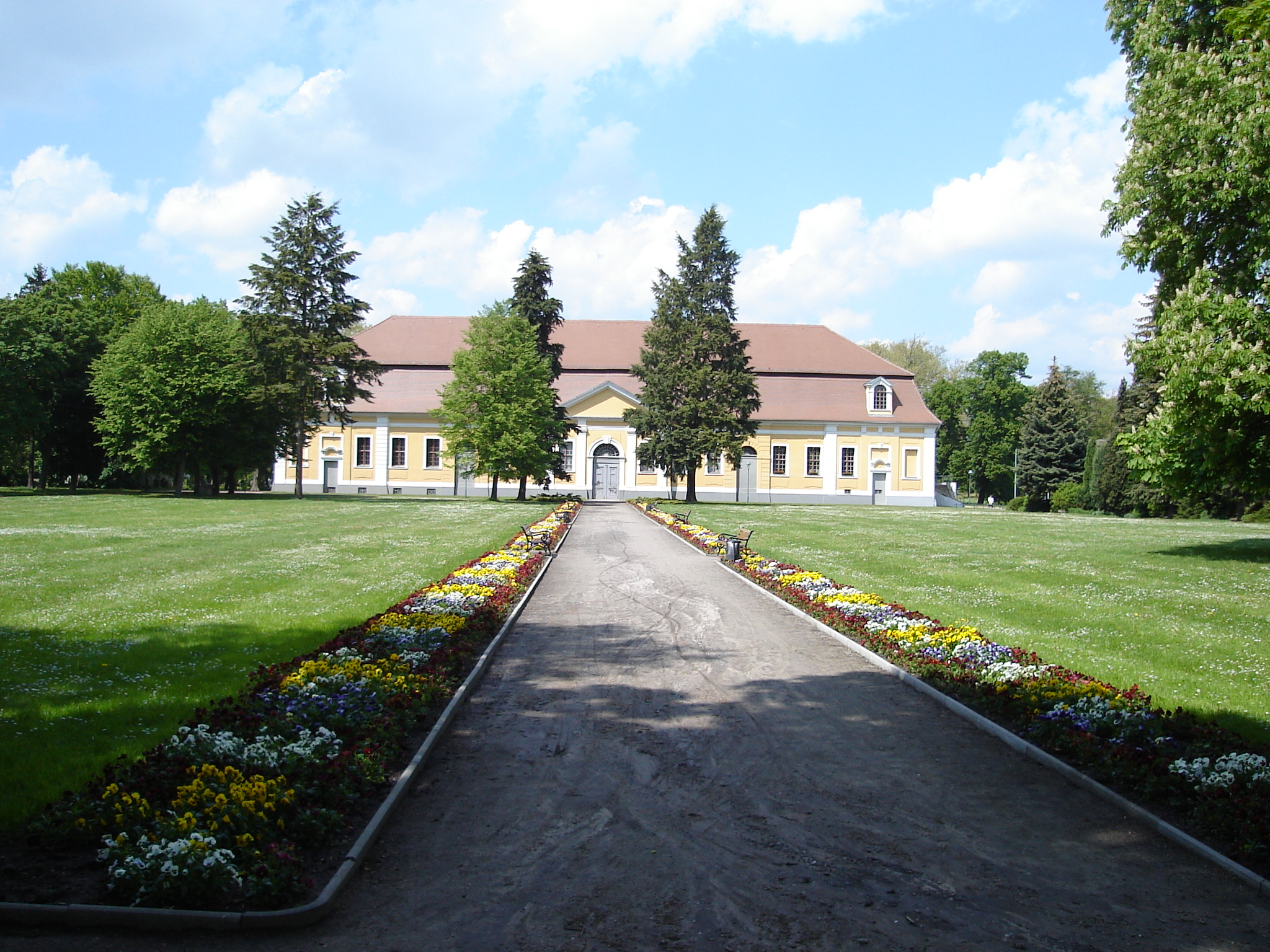
Zerbst town hall

- Principality of Anhalt-Zerbst
