= Magdeburg (disambiguation) =

Magdeburg is the capital city of Saxony-Anhalt, Germany.

Magdeburg may also refer to:

Places:

- Magdeburg Region, a region of Saxony-Anhalt, Germany
- Magdeburg (region), a former region of Saxony-Anhalt
- Roman Catholic Diocese of Magdeburg, a modern Roman Catholic diocese
- Marca Geronis, sometimes called the March of Magdeburg, a very large march (border region) in the tenth century
- Duchy of Magdeburg, a province of Brandenburg-Prussia (1680–1701) and of the Kingdom of Prussia (1701–1807)
- Province of Magdeburg, a province in Nazi Germany from 1944 to 1945
- Magdeburg (Bezirk), a former district (Bezirk) of East Germany
- 55735 Magdeburg, an asteroid

Ships:

- Magdeburg-class cruiser, a class of German Imperial Navy ships
  - SMS Magdeburg, a German First World War light cruiser, and the lead ship of the class
- Magdeburg, a Braunschweig-class corvette in the German navy

Other uses:

- 1. FC Magdeburg, a German football club
- SC Magdeburg, a German multi-sports club

== See also ==
- Mechthild of Magdeburg (c. 1207–c. 1282/1294), a medieval mystic
- Adalbert of Magdeburg, a canonised German monk
