= Bornum =

Bornum can refer to the following places in Germany:

- Bornum, Saxony-Anhalt
- Bornum am Elm, Königslutter, Lower Saxony
- Bornum am Harz, Bockenem, Lower Saxony
- Bornum, Börßum, Lower Saxony
- Bornum, Hanover, Lower Saxony
