= Bernhard Meyer (musician) =

Bernard Meyer (died 1713) was a German musician who worked at the electoral court in Zerbst from 1634.

== Career ==
From about 1670 Bernhard Meyer was a chamber musician and organist employed at the princely court of Anhalt-Zerbst until his death in 1713.,

Mayer was the teacher of Heinrich Michael Keller (1638–1710), an organist in Frankenhausen.

Meyer was the author of a treatise and some organ pieces dated 1673, whereabout currently unknown.

== Selected works ==
=== For choir ===
- 1677. Hoch-fürstliche Bernburgische Trauer-Ode for SATB voices and basso continuo.
- 1681. Trauer- und Lob-Gedicht for SATB voices and basso continuo.

=== For organ ===
- 1673. In 1813 Meyer was noted as the author of a treatise and some organ pieces dated 1673.
- In 1681 Daniel Croner copied three pieces by Meyer into his 1681 'Tablatura' collection: no. 67 in Em (Toccata 3t[ert]ii Toni Durch Mordantern), no. 68 in Em (Fuga Simplex Tertii Modi), no. 69 in Am (Fuga ex A).
- 1700?. 'Meine Seele erhebet den Herren': chorale partita.
