= Jenny Hirsch =

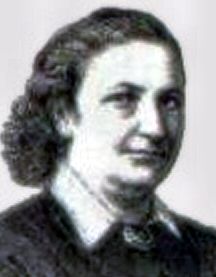
- Born: 25 November 1829
- Died: 10 March 1902 (aged 72); Berlin, German Empire

Jenny Hirsch (25 November 1829 in Zerbst – 10 March 1902 in Berlin) was a German author and reformer.

== Biography ==
Jenny Hirsch was born on 25 November 1829 in Zerbst, the daughter of Jakob Hirsch, a merchant, and Bertha Elkisch Bendix. She was a tutor in Zerbst for several years. She went to Berlin in 1860 and wrote for the Bazar under the pseudonym J. N. Heynrichs until 1864. About that time, she became interested in woman's rights and female education. She was a member of the Women's Congress of 1865 at Leipzig, and for many years was a leader in the Lette-Verein.

She edited Der Frauenanwalt (The woman attorney, 1870–82) and, with Lina Morgenstern, Deutsche Hausfrauenzeitung (German housewife's newspaper, 1887–92). With Mary Wall, she wrote Haus und Gesellschaft in England (Households and society in England, 1878). In 1881, she published Fürstin Frau Mutter, and after it many other tales. Among them are the following titles: Die Erben (1889), Vermisst (1894), Löwenfelde (1890), Der Amtmann von Rapshagen (1890), Schuldig (1899), and Camilla Feinberg (1901). Under the title Hörigkeit der Frau (3d ed. 1891), she translated into German Mill's Subjection of Woman, and wrote a Geschichte der 25 jährigen Wirksamkeit des Lette-Vereins (History of 25 years of work of the Lette Society, 1892).
