= Anhalt-Wittenberg =

Anhalt-Wittenberg is the name of the easternmost region of the German state of Saxony-Anhalt. It includes the landscape units of Anhalt, the Fläming Heath and the region along the River Elbe in the area of the Lutherstadt Wittenberg and the town of Köthen. The centre of the region is Dessau-Roßlau. To the west Anhalt-Wittenberg borders on the Elbe-Börde Heath.

== Districts ==
- Landkreis Anhalt-Bitterfeld
- Landkreis Wittenberg
- Dessau-Roßlau (independent town)

== Districts prior to the reform of 2007 ==
- Landkreis Anhalt-Zerbst
- Landkreis Köthen
- Landkreis Wittenberg
- Dessau (independent town)

The communes of the Anhalt-Wittenberg region work together for a common infrastructure plan, marketing and representation to outside agencies.
