= East Minus West Equals Zero =

Book by Werner Keller

East Minus West Equals Zero: Russia's Debt to the Western World 862-1962
- Author: Werner Keller
- Original title: Ost minus West gleich Null
- Publisher: Putnam
- Publication date: 1962 (hardback)
- Publication place: Germany
- Pages: 384

East Minus West Equals Zero: Russia's Debt to the Western World 862-1962 (German: Ost minus West gleich Null) is a 1962 book by journalist Werner Keller. The author posits in his polemic that the modern culture and civilization of Russia and Eastern Slavs in general, including their political institutions, social order, and scientific and technological advances, all have their ultimate origin in Western Civilization and its creative potential. These durable achievements were supposedly culturally imported through imitation, emulation, and the dynastic and demographic influence of Western elements in Russia, from Czarist times onwards.

The author asserts that not a single contribution of science, arts, technology, or any other aspect of Western civilization had origination in Russia and that every alleged cultural and scientific achievement of Russia from its late medieval inception to the Space Race has effectively been a copy of Western achievements. The book was well received by the critics of its era. Published shortly after the erection of the Berlin Wall, it exacerbated Cold War feeling in the then West German public.
