= Barby Ferry =

Cable ferry in Saxony-Anhalt, Germany

Coordinates: 51.95987°N 11.908171°E

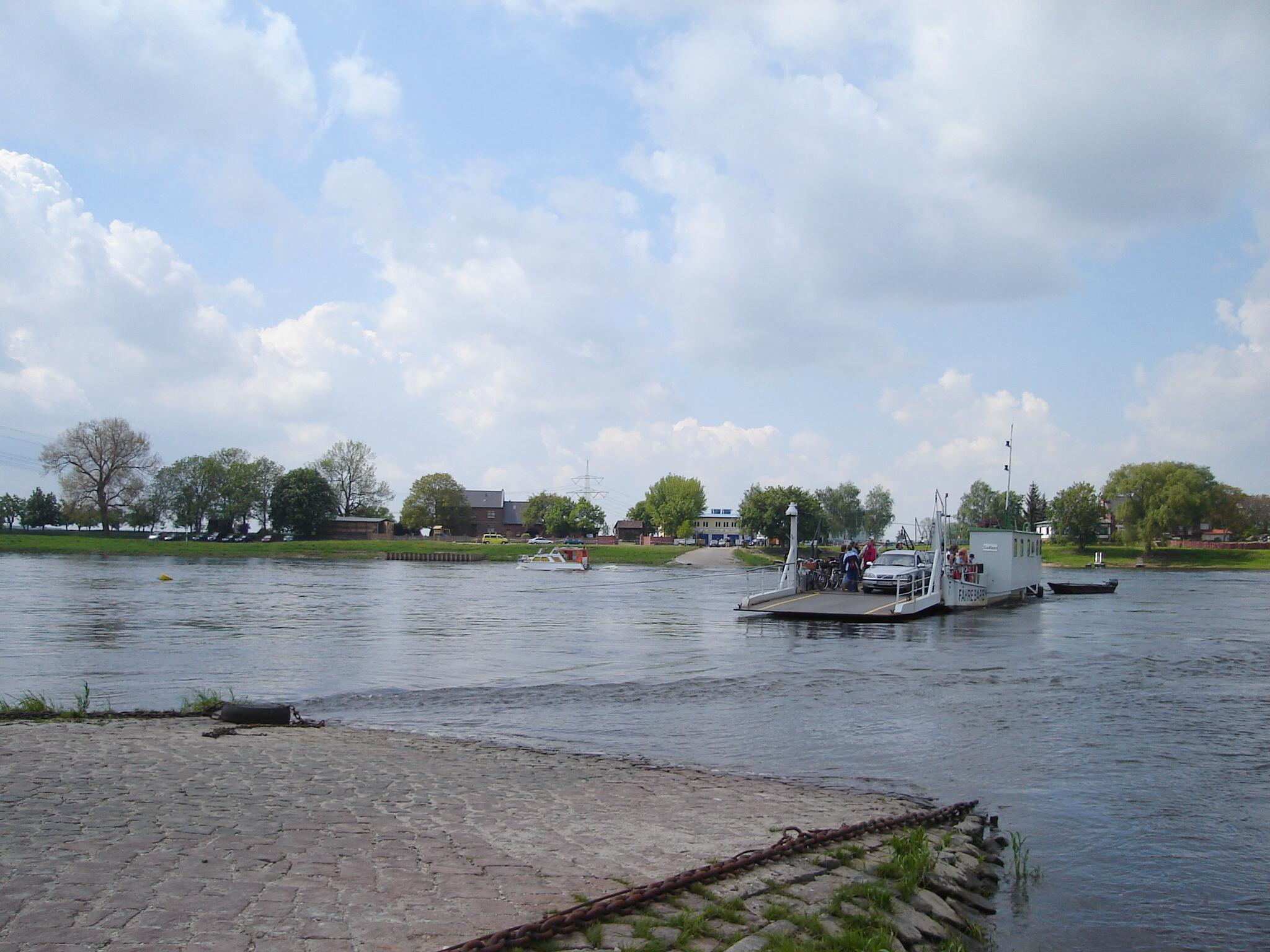
The Barby Ferry.

The Barby Ferry, also known as the Ronney Barby Ferry, is a cable ferry across the Elbe river between Barby and Walternienburg in Saxony-Anhalt, Germany.

Technically, the ferry is a reaction ferry, which is propelled by the current of the water. The ferry is attached to a floating cable which is anchored firmly in the riverbed upstream of the ferry. To operate the ferry, it is angled into the current, causing the force of the current to swing the ferry across the river on the cable.
