= Werner Keller (writer) =

German resistance fighter (1909–1980)

Werner Keller (13 August 1909 in Gut Nutha, Anhalt – 29 February 1980 in Ascona) was a German civil servant, journalist, nonfiction author and anti-Nazi resistance fighter.

He studied engineering and medicine, and then jurisprudence, in Berlin, Rostock, Zürich and Jena. In 1933 he became a Doctor of Jurisprudence.

While working as a senior staff member in Albert Speer's Ministry of Armaments, he saved the lives of many Jews. In 1945 Keller organized an anti-Nazi resistance group in Berlin which briefly ran a pirate radio station (and which planned a rather foolhardy attempt on Hitler's life).

He was caught and sentenced by the Nazi Volksgerichtshof ("People's Court") to death by hanging. In February 1945 high-ranking friends managed, possibly by a bribe, to get his execution put off at the last moment and get him transferred to Fort Zinna, the Wehrmacht prison in Torgau. There, Keller was liberated by American troops of the 69th Infantry Division at the end of April 1945.

After the Second World War, Keller worked as a journalist and a science writer in Hamburg. He worked for Nordwestdeutscher Rundfunk (The North West German Broadcasting Corporation) and for such papers and magazines as Die Welt, Die Zeit, Stern, and Neue Illustrierte, sometimes using the pseudonym "Norman Alken".

In 1955 he published The Bible as History, his best-known and most successful book, which correlated the text of the Bible with the results of archaeological diggings in the Middle East, providing, according to Keller, a confirmation for the Bible's veracity which was not dependent on religious faith. It had a circulation of over one million in Germany and has been translated into more than 20 languages. It was released in the United States in October 1956. In 1957 gained him the Italian Literary Prize Premio Bancarella. Among other languages it was translated into Hebrew (without the New Testament chapters) at a time when Israeli-German cultural relations were far from a given; in 1958 the Davar Labour daily in Tel Aviv distributed free copies of Keller's history to its subscribers. The revised edition (publisher a year after his death) goes along with Kathleen Kenyon’s findings, which suggest Jericho’s walls had fallen much earlier than the 13th century BC. Keller acknowledged that the Book of Joshua portrays a swift, total, and unified military conquest, whereas the Book of Judges describes a slow, incomplete, and highly fractured tribal struggle in which the Israelites fail to drive out many Canaanite populations, coexisting with or becoming dominated by them in various regions. He suggested that the story might have developed from local memories of the destructions suffered by the Canaanite city in the 3rd and 2nd millennium BC, which were later used by the biblical writers to create their narrative and/or that the biblical story might reflect a later "re-telling" of the destruction of a smaller, less fortified settlement that existed during the Late Bronze Age collapse.

Among his other works, the socio-historical book East Minus West Equals Zero, in which the author asserts that all political, scientific and cultural achievements of Russians from medieval times to the onset of the Space Race had their origin in the West, from where they were imported and copied, gained the attention of the Cold War Western public.

Later books by Keller dealt with the history and culture of the Etruscans.
