= Lindau (Anhalt) =

- Stadtteil of Zerbst
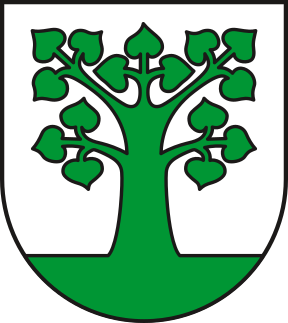
- Coat of arms
- Interactive map of Lindau
- Location within Germany Location within Saxony-Anhalt
- Coordinates: 52°1′N 12°5′E
- Country: Germany
- State: Saxony-Anhalt
- District: Anhalt-Bitterfeld
- Town: Zerbst

Area
  - Total: 34.64 km^{2} (13.37 sq mi)
- Elevation: 75 m (246 ft)

Population (2006-12-31)
  - Total: 1,148
  - Density: 33.14/km^{2} (85.83/sq mi)
- Time zone: UTC+01:00 (CET)
  - Summer (DST): UTC+02:00 (CEST)
- Postal codes: 39264
- Dialling codes: 039246
- Vehicle registration: ABI

Lindau (German pronunciation: [ˈlɪndaʊ]) is a small town and a former municipality in the district Anhalt-Bitterfeld in Saxony-Anhalt, Germany. It is part of the Verwaltungsgemeinschaft ("collective municipality") Elbe-Ehle-Nuthe. It is situated near Zerbst on the river Nuthe in the landscape and low mountain range Fläming and Fläming Nature Park.

Since 1 January 2010, it is part of the town Zerbst.

== Sights ==
- Castle Lindau, probably built in 9th/10th century. First mentioned in 1179.
