= Gödnitz =

- Stadtteil of Zerbst
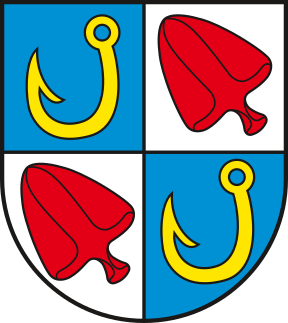
- Coat of arms
- Interactive map of Gödnitz
- Location within Germany Location within Saxony-Anhalt
- Coordinates: 52°0′N 11°55′E
- Country: Germany
- State: Saxony-Anhalt
- District: Anhalt-Bitterfeld
- Town: Zerbst

Area
  - Total: 10.80 km^{2} (4.17 sq mi)
- Elevation: 58 m (190 ft)

Population (2008-12-31)
  - Total: 241
  - Density: 22.3/km^{2} (57.8/sq mi)
- Time zone: UTC+01:00 (CET)
  - Summer (DST): UTC+02:00 (CEST)
- Postal codes: 39264
- Dialling codes: 039247
- Vehicle registration: ABI

Gödnitz is a village and a former municipality in the district of Anhalt-Bitterfeld, in Saxony-Anhalt, Germany. Since 1 January 2010, it is part of the town Zerbst/Anhalt.

== Geography ==
The villages Gödnitz and Flötz are between the towns Zerbst and Barby. Next to the villages there is the Gödnitz Lake which is an oxbow of the Elbe. Both villages are on the eastern side of the Elbe at the end of the moraine. The western part of Gödnitz/Flötz is a part of the Mittelelbe Biosphere. In the North West of Gödnitz the Nuthe flows into the Elbe.

== History ==
1929 there were excavations in Flötz where some vessels were found which are assigned to the Walternienburg-Bernburg Culture. This proves that there was colonisation in Flötz already in the Neolithic age.

The relatively elevated position protects the village from flood which was the reason for a very early colonisation.

Already in the Iron Age there were Germanic people living at this place long time before the Slavs colonised this area in the 5th and 6th century.

The history of Gödnitz and Flötz was connected to the East Elbe outposts of the Teutonic Order. From the first repossession attempts of Charlemagne in the 8th century to the final victory of the Teutonic Order in the 11th century Gödnitz and Flötz must have changed their sovereign very often.

While the Christianisation of the former Slavic territory the church in Flötz was built as a solid stone building which could resist attacks from the Slavic people. The area's Christianisation took about 300 years.

In 974 the villages were given to the Quedlinburg Abbey who gave them to the dukes of Saxony who gave them to the earl of Barby. When the noble family of Barby got extinct in 1659 Flötz and Gödnitz were taken by the Anhalt-Zerbst family. When the Anhalt-Zerbst family got extinct in 1793 with no heir the villages were given to Anhalt-Dessau where Leopold III was the Duke.

After Napoleon's rule and the Congress of Vienna all the villages in the area except Gödnitz and Dornburg were given to the new Province Saxony in the Kingdom of Prussia while Gödnitz remained an enclave of Anhalt.

Because of the different state membership both villages could never grow together. In the 19th century there was a school, a mayor and a parish each village. Even today you can see massive landmarks at the former border of Anhalt and Prussia.

After World War II the territory of the free State of Anhalt and the Province of Saxony were combined to the Province of Saxony-Anhalt and later on in 1947 Land Saxony-Anhalt. Flötz and Gödnitz were now part of the county Zerbst.

1952 the Land Saxony-Anhalt was disbanded and the territory was integrated into the new GDR Bezirk Magdeburg. During the GDR rule the villages Gödnitz and Flötz were made one community named Gödnitz while Flötz became a district of it.

After the German Reunification the county membership did not change, Gödnitz remained part of Anhalt-Zerbst. 2007 Anhalt-Zerbst was united with the counties Köthen and Bitterfeld to a new one called Anhalt-Bitterfeld.

2010 the villages around Zerbst were added to the town which is called Zerbst/Anhalt since then. The villages are now districts of Zerbst/Anhalt. Until December 31, 2009, Gödnitz was an independent municipality with the associated district of Flötz. On a municipal area of 11.8 km² lived 241 inhabitants (December 31, 2008). The last mayor of Gödnitz was Volker Leps.
