= Peter Hagendorf =

German mercenary soldier in the Thirty Years' War

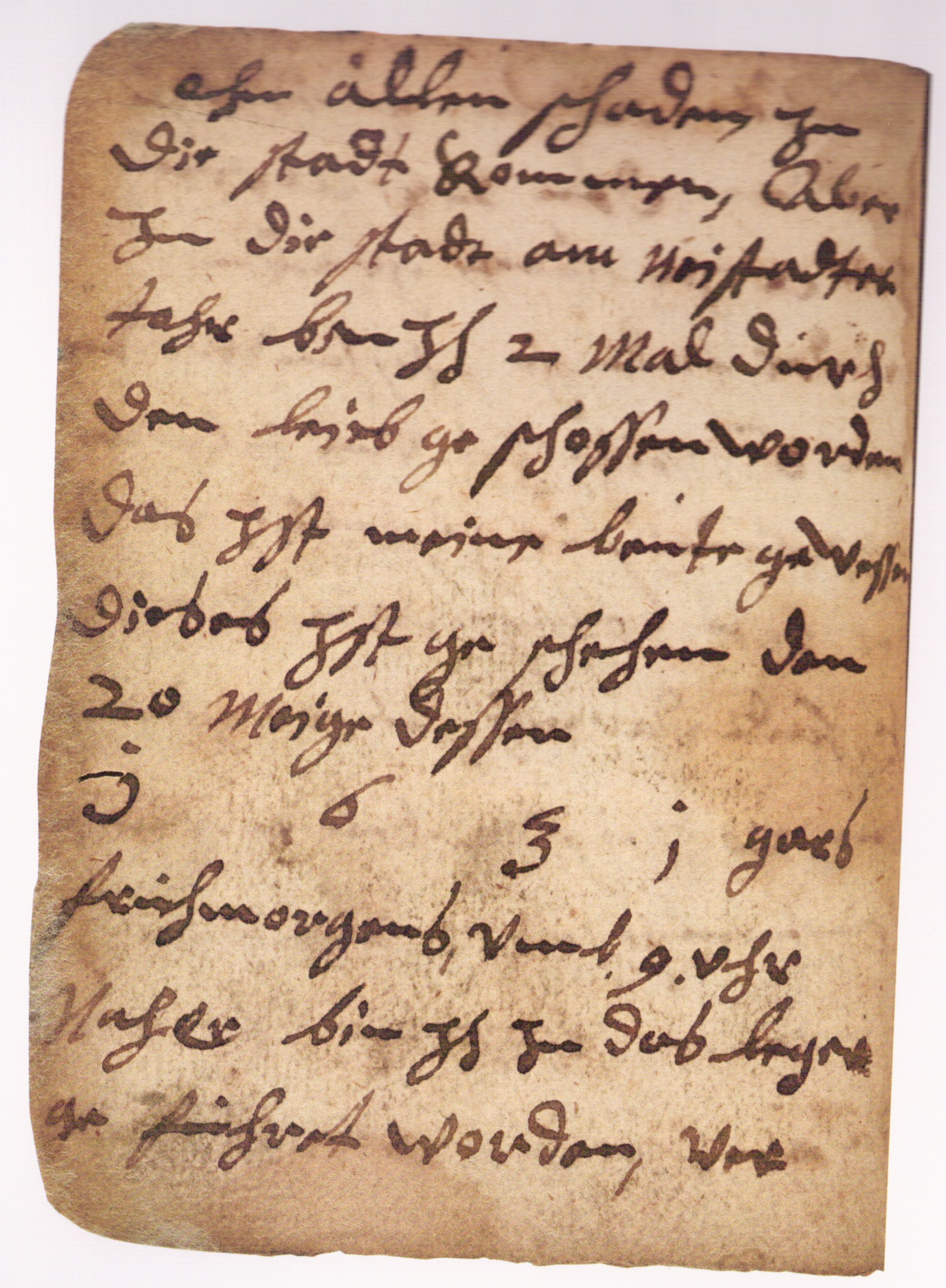
A page from Peter Hagendorf's diary

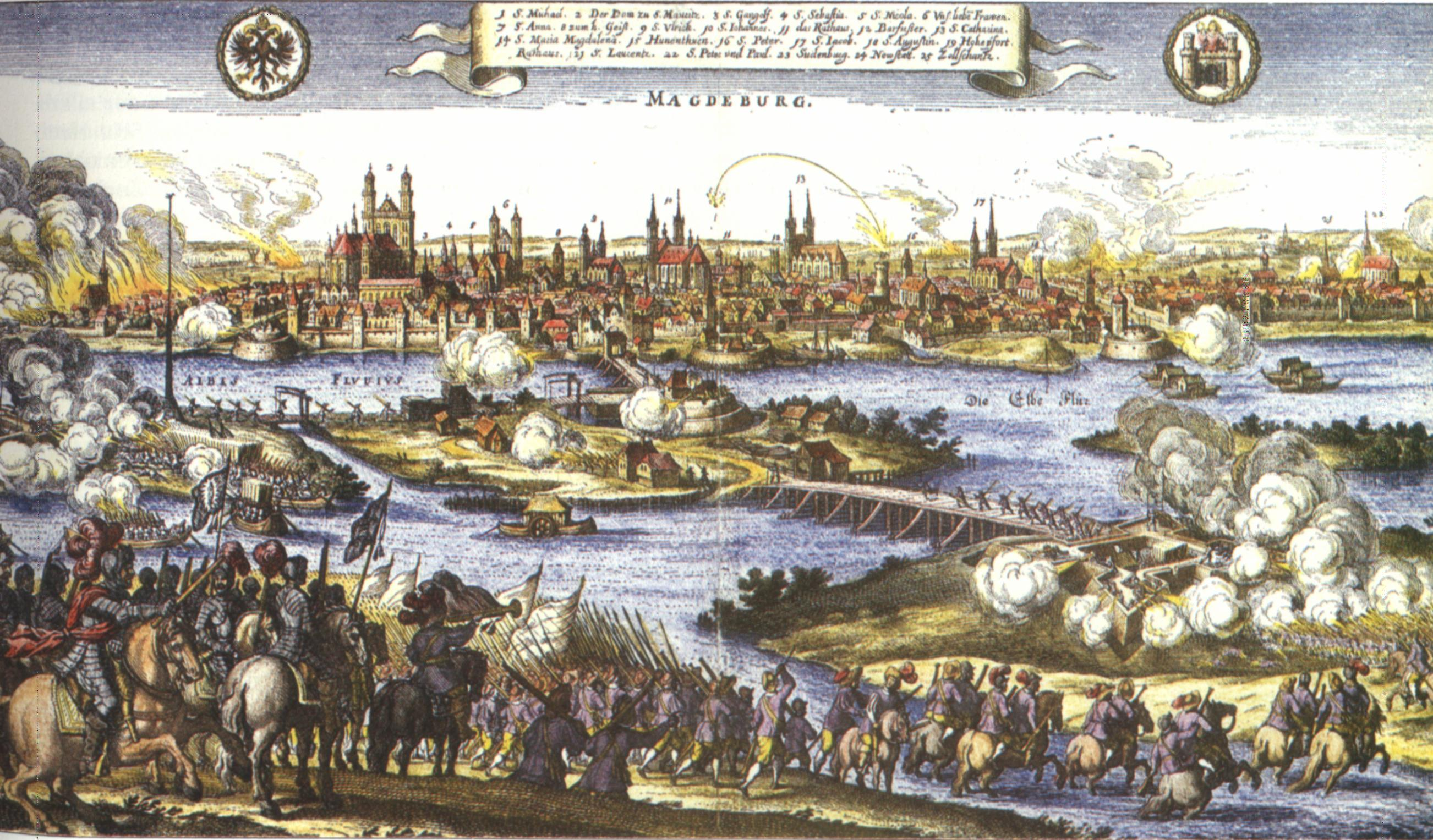
Sack of Magdeburg 1631, in a painting of 1646

Peter Hagendorf was a German mercenary soldier in the Thirty Years' War. He wrote a diary which gives a unique historic record of life in the army from the viewpoint of a simple Landsknecht.

Current research relates the book author to Peter Hagendorf, first principal of Görzke, who died on 4 February 1679 at age of 77. As such he was probably born in 1601 or 1602 in the Principality of Anhalt-Zerbst near Nedlitz.

== History ==
His writings were found by chance in 1988 in the manuscript store of the Berlin State Library. The surviving part covers a range of 25 years between 1625 and 1649. The book was folded from 12 sheets of paper which he bought at the end of the war in 1648 to write a fair copy of his notes. The 192 pages tell of a 22,500 km long journey across Europe filled with battles in Italy, the German states, Spanish Netherlands and France. He took part in the Sack of Magdeburg (the devastation was so great that "magdeburgization" became an oft-used term signifying total destruction, rape and pillaging for decades) and the Battle of Nördlingen (1634). He details a life on the verge of death which includes his first wife and seven of his children.

The diary was anonymous. However the author had written down the dates and places of the birth of his daughters and where his wife came from. As for one proof the diary says that his daughter Magreta was born on 3 November 1645 in Pappenheim, and by chance the church register of that town had survived the war. It has an entry for an Anna Marget on that day with a mother named Anna Maria (equivalent with his wife's name) denoting Peter Hagendorf as the father. Other sources support the notion, for example the first church register (1629–1635) of Engelrod (Lautertal) has the following christening entry: „Eichelhain, Anno 1629, August 17., Elisabeth, Peter Hagendorffs, eines Soldaten von Zerbst Döchterlein ...“ Near the given origin Zerbst exists even a locality named Hagendorf.

Based on Hagendorf's writing it is now known that many women and children followed in the baggage train, how the division of responsibilities was organized between men and wife in the army camp, how the treatment of wounds was organized, how sieges were announced and how the sack (looting) of an overpowered city took place. Hagendorf fought for the most part in Pappenheim's regiment. The diary was discovered by Jan Peters in 1988, an East German professor at the time.

Peter Hagendorf expresses mixed feelings towards the Peace of Westphalia in 1648. He had basically lost his job which required him to work now as a night guard, and to take up other unskilled work. Without giving a reason, he picks up his son from the provost, travelling with his family northeast through Öttingen. His last location is Günzburg when the diary stops - the last three pages are missing.

=== After 1649 ===
Professor Jan Peters, who had published a transcribed version of the book in 1993, had already indicated that the language points to a Rhinelandic origin (in today's western Germany). That may contradict the designation of Zerbst in the christening entry (in today's eastern Germany) however further research revealed that the Fläming Heath was dominated by settlers from the Rhine regions at the time. The Fläming region is in the north-east of the historic Principality of Anhalt-Zerbst – the region was later amalgamated into Prussia taking over its language from the Potsdam-Berlin area.

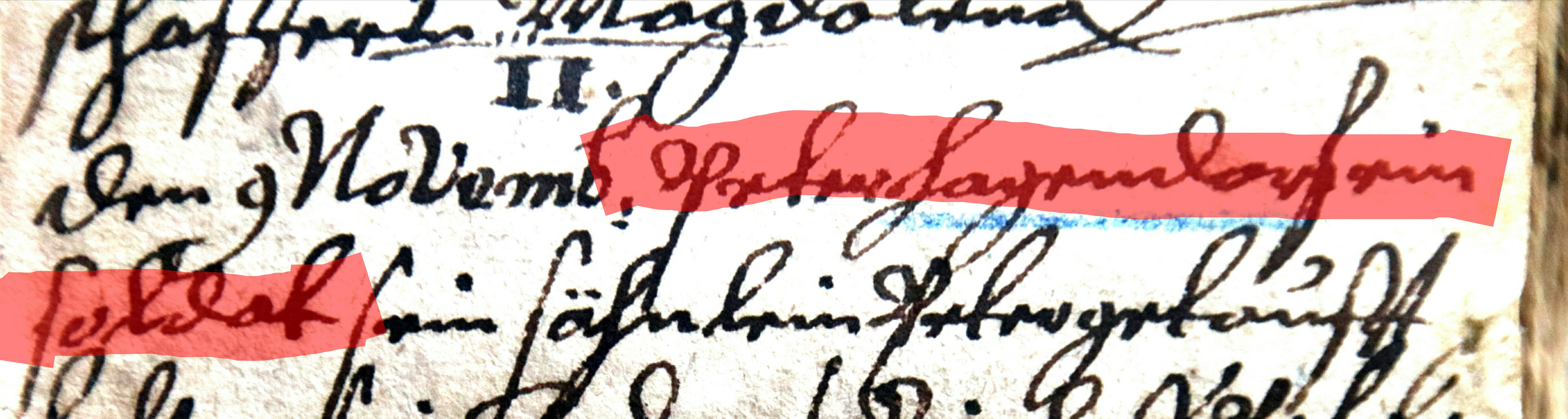
Churchbook entry of Görzke, telling of the baptism the son Peter of "Peter Hagendorf, ein Soldat (a soldier)" highlighted in red

Later research had focused on the question where the book author may have gained his knowledge in writing as well as Latin. Apart from the Francisceum Zerbst the region had schools in Bad Belzig and Wiesenburg. Faith schools for sacristans are known for Grubo and Görzke as their pastors were also recorded as school principals. While checking the church register, the death note for Peter Hagendorf was discovered. There is a valid interpretation that the mercenary was returning to his old homeland after the wars - according to the registers in Görzke he baptized his son Peter, on 9 November 1649 along with his family. Multiple notes in the Görzke registers state his wife's name as "Anna Maria Hagendorf", which is consistent with the name of his second wife in the mercenary's book.

Moreover, the civil registers showed that his children survived and four more sons were born from where two reached the adult age. All get married, so that along the heritage lines some offspring live in modern times. The registers show a number of people in the area with the family name Hagendorf, however the village Hagendorf had no recordings of that name later than the 16th century. This may be a result of a plague epidemic between 1400 and 1610 where most of the inhabitants moved to Grubo. Grubo was deserted around 1640, with the villagers moving to Görzke. From that history along with godmother and godfather entries of an Anna and her father Martin Hagendorf, there is a theory that Peter had relatives in Görzke upon returning. It may also explain how he did become mayor already in 1650, holding also other principal positions until his death decades later.

While Nedlitz is part of the Anhalt principality, it happens that Görzke is part of Prussia's Brandenburg dominions. Both villages are roughly 20 km apart, Görzke being to the northeast. The local provost and book lover Gottlieb Ernst Schmid (1727–1814) had assembled a large library throughout his life time. It was donated to the Prussian state library in Berlin in 1803 with the diary being a part of it. It was found there in 1988 by Jan Peters who did recognize the importance for the science of history. The fame has grown over the years, leading up to a TV documentary in 2011 where Peter Hagendorf was pictured in Der Dreißigjährige Kriege (Teil 1) – Von Feldherren, Söldnern und Karrieristen.

== Excerpt ==
In Walde fur Magdeborgk, Alda Ist vnser haubtman, fur eine schannse todt, nebhen Ihrer viel, geschossen worden. [..] den 20 Meige, haben wir mit ernst angesedtzet vndt gesturmet vndt auch erobert, da bin Ich mit sturmer handt ohn allen schaden, In die stadt kommen. Aber in die stadt am neistadter tohr bin Ich 2 Mal durch den leieb geschossen worden das Ist meine beute gewesen. [..] Nachher bin Ich In das leger gefuhret worden, verbunden, den einmal, bin Ich durch den bauch, forne durch geschossen, zum andern durch beide agslen, dass die Kugel, Ist In das hembte gelehgen, Also hat mir der feldtscher, die hende auff den Rugken gebunden, das er hat können Meissel, einbringen, Also bin Ich In meiner hudten gebracht worden, halb todt. [..] wie Ich nun verbunden bin, Ist mein weieb In die Stadt gegangen, da sie doch vber all gebrunnen hat [..] Auff den Abendt sindt nun meine gespan kommen, hat mir ein leder edtwas verehret, einen tall oder halben tall.

In the woods of Magdeburg, there our captain was shot dead for one of the entrenchments of the many there were. [..] on the 20th of May we earnestly engaged and stormed and also seized, there I came into town with storming hand without scathe. But in the town at the Newtown Gate I was shot two times in the body as this was my loot. [..] Later I was led into the camp, bandaged, for one I was shot in the stomach, and for the other through both axels that the bullet laid in the shirt. So the feldscher (army surgeon) bound my hands on the back so that he could insert the chisel (forceps). As that I was brought back to my shelter half dead. [..] As I was bandaged, my wife went into the town even that it was burning all over. [..] In the evening (it was that) my companions came and each of them bestowed me something, a thaler or half a thaler.

== Literature ==
- Peter Burschel: Himmelreich und Hölle. Ein Söldner, sein Tagebuch und die Ordnungen des Krieges. In: Benigna von Krusenstjern, Hans Medick (ed.): Zwischen Alltag und Katastrophe. Der Dreißigjährige Krieg aus der Nähe. 2. Auflage, (Veröffentlichungen des Max-Planck-Instituts für Geschichte, Band 148), Vandenhoeck & Ruprecht, Göttingen 2001, S. 181–194, ISBN 3-525-35463-0.
- Tryntje Helfferich: The Thirty Years War: A Documentary History. Hackett Publisgn bvh 2hth 2g 2009, pp. 274–302.
- Hans-Christian Huf: Mit Gottes Segen in die Hölle – Der Dreißigjährige Krieg. Ullstein-Verlag, Berlin 2001.
- Jan Peters (Hrsg.): Ein Söldnerleben im Dreißigjährigen Krieg. Eine Quelle zur Sozialgeschichte. (Selbstzeugnisse der Neuzeit. Quellen und Darstellungen zur Sozial- und Erfahrungsgeschichte), Akademie Verlag, Berlin 1993, ISBN 3-05-001008-8, Inhaltsverzeichnis als PDF-Datei
