= Leps, Saxony-Anhalt =

- Stadtteil of Zerbst
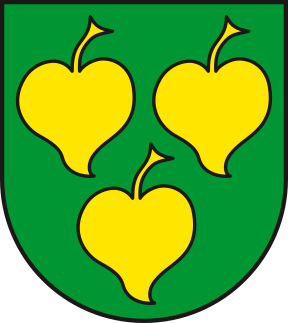
- Coat of arms
- Interactive map of Leps, Saxony-Anhalt
- Location within Germany Location within Saxony-Anhalt
- Coordinates: 51°55′N 12°3′E
- Country: Germany
- State: Saxony-Anhalt
- District: Anhalt-Bitterfeld
- Town: Zerbst

Area
  - Total: 21.90 km^{2} (8.46 sq mi)
- Elevation: 67 m (220 ft)

Population (2006-12-31)
  - Total: 316
  - Density: 14.4/km^{2} (37.4/sq mi)
- Time zone: UTC+01:00 (CET)
  - Summer (DST): UTC+02:00 (CEST)
- Postal codes: 39264
- Dialling codes: 03923
- Vehicle registration: ABI

Leps is a village and a former municipality situated in the district of Anhalt-Bitterfeld, in Saxony-Anhalt, Germany.

Since 1 January 2010, it has been part of the town of Zerbst.
