= Jütrichau =

- Stadtteil of Zerbst
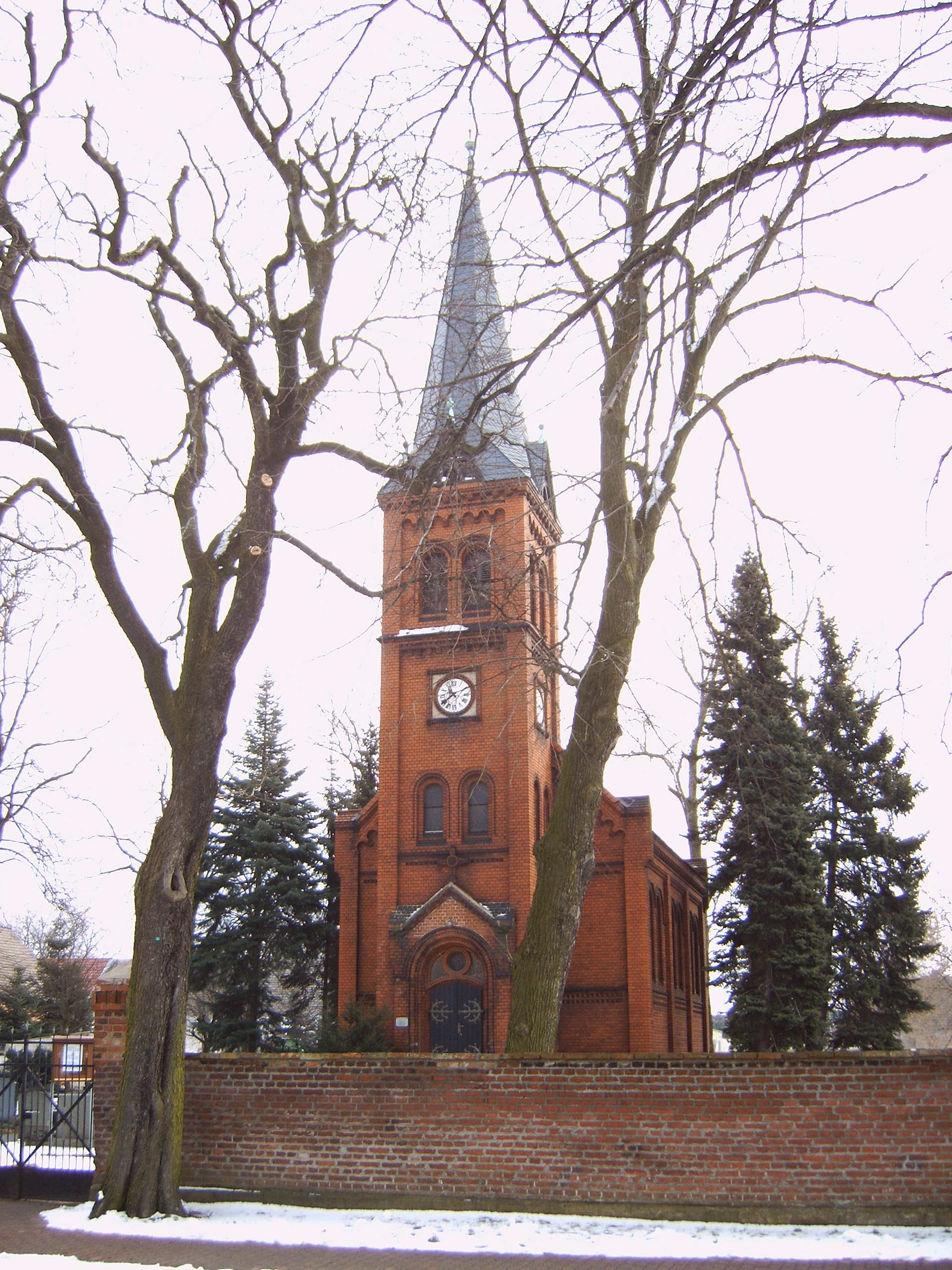

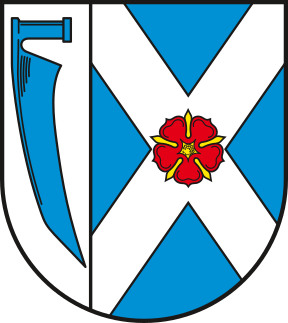
- Coat of arms
- Interactive map of Jütrichau
- Location within Germany Location within Saxony-Anhalt
- Coordinates: 51°56′5″N 12°7′50″E
- Country: Germany
- State: Saxony-Anhalt
- District: Anhalt-Bitterfeld
- Town: Zerbst

Area
  - Total: 18.22 km^{2} (7.03 sq mi)
- Elevation: 74 m (243 ft)

Population (2006-12-31)
  - Total: 512
  - Density: 28.1/km^{2} (72.8/sq mi)
- Time zone: UTC+01:00 (CET)
  - Summer (DST): UTC+02:00 (CEST)
- Postal codes: 39264
- Dialling codes: 03923
- Vehicle registration: ABI
- Website: www.juetrichau.de

Jütrichau is a village and a former municipality in the district of Anhalt-Bitterfeld, in Saxony-Anhalt, Germany.

Since 1 January 2010, it is part of the town Zerbst.
