= Gehrden, Saxony-Anhalt =

Gehrden
- Stadtteil of Zerbst
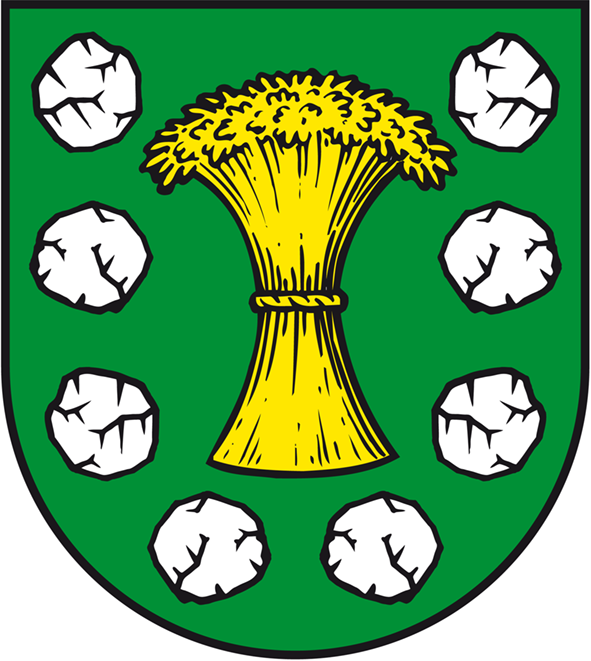
- Coat of arms
- Interactive map of Gehrden
- Location within Germany Location within Saxony-Anhalt
- Coordinates: 52°00′N 11°56′E
- Country: Germany
- State: Saxony-Anhalt
- District: Anhalt-Bitterfeld
- Town: Zerbst

Area
  - Total: 6.81 km^{2} (2.63 sq mi)
- Elevation: 69 m (226 ft)

Population (2006-12-31)
  - Total: 216
  - Density: 31.7/km^{2} (82.1/sq mi)
- Time zone: UTC+01:00 (CET)
  - Summer (DST): UTC+02:00 (CEST)
- Postal codes: 39264
- Dialling codes: 039247
- Vehicle registration: ABI

Gehrden (German pronunciation: [ˈɡeːɐdn̩]) is a village and a former municipality in the district of Anhalt-Bitterfeld, in Saxony-Anhalt, Germany.

Since 1 January 2010, it is part of the town Zerbst.
