= Polenzko =

- Stadtteil of Zerbst
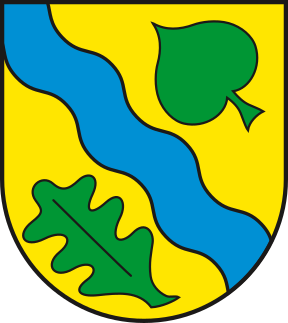
- Coat of arms
- Interactive map of Polenzko
- Location within Germany Location within Saxony-Anhalt
- Coordinates: 52°0′N 12°15′E
- Country: Germany
- State: Saxony-Anhalt
- District: Anhalt-Bitterfeld
- Town: Zerbst

Area
  - Total: 19.92 km^{2} (7.69 sq mi)
- Elevation: 93 m (305 ft)

Population (2006-12-31)
  - Total: 301
  - Density: 15.1/km^{2} (39.1/sq mi)
- Time zone: UTC+01:00 (CET)
  - Summer (DST): UTC+02:00 (CEST)
- Postal codes: 39264
- Dialling codes: 039248
- Vehicle registration: ABI

Polenzko is a village and a former municipality in the district of Anhalt-Bitterfeld, in Saxony-Anhalt, Germany.

Since 1 January 2010, it is part of the town Zerbst.
