= Moritz, Germany =

Moritz
- Stadtteil of Zerbst
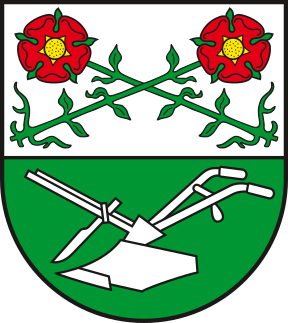
- Coat of arms
- Interactive map of Moritz
- Location within Germany Location within Saxony-Anhalt
- Coordinates: 51°59′45″N 12°1′36″E
- Country: Germany
- State: Saxony-Anhalt
- District: Anhalt-Bitterfeld
- Town: Zerbst

Area
  - Total: 16.18 km^{2} (6.25 sq mi)
- Elevation: 67 m (220 ft)

Population (2006-12-31)
  - Total: 343
  - Density: 21.2/km^{2} (54.9/sq mi)
- Time zone: UTC+01:00 (CET)
  - Summer (DST): UTC+02:00 (CEST)
- Postal codes: 39264
- Dialling codes: 039247
- Vehicle registration: ABI

Moritz (German pronunciation: [ˈmoːʁɪts]) is a village and a former municipality in the district of Anhalt-Bitterfeld, in Saxony-Anhalt, Germany.

Since 1 January 2010, it is part of the town Zerbst.
