= Hohenlepte =

- Stadtteil of Zerbst
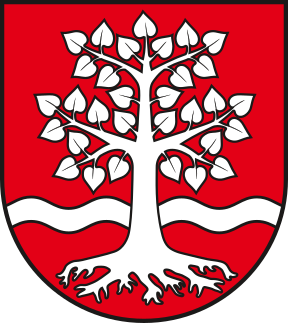
- Coat of arms
- Interactive map of Hohenlepte
- Location within Germany Location within Saxony-Anhalt
- Coordinates: 51°57′16″N 12°00′37″E
- Country: Germany
- State: Saxony-Anhalt
- District: Anhalt-Bitterfeld
- Town: Zerbst

Area
  - Total: 19.11 km^{2} (7.38 sq mi)
- Elevation: 64 m (210 ft)

Population (2006-12-31)
  - Total: 243
  - Density: 12.7/km^{2} (32.9/sq mi)
- Time zone: UTC+01:00 (CET)
  - Summer (DST): UTC+02:00 (CEST)
- Postal codes: 39264
- Dialling codes: 039247, 03923
- Vehicle registration: ABI

Hohenlepte (German pronunciation: [ˈhoːənlɛptə]) is a village and a former municipality in the district of Anhalt-Bitterfeld, in Saxony-Anhalt, Germany. Since 1 January 2010, it is part of the town Zerbst. Hohenlepte has 234 inhabitants and lies some 71 mi (or 115 km) southwest of Berlin.
