= Magdeburg Region =

Central region in the state of Saxony-Anhalt in North Germany

The Magdeburg Region (German: Region Magdeburg) is the name of the central region in the state of Saxony-Anhalt in North Germany. It includes the landscape units of Magdeburg Börde, Jerichow Land, the northern Harz Foreland and the Colbitz-Letzlingen Heath. The centre of the region is the city of Magdeburg; other important towns are Haldensleben, Aschersleben, Staßfurt, Oschersleben, Schönebeck (Elbe) and Burg. Towards the east the Elbe-Börde Heath transitions into the neighbouring region of Anhalt-Wittenberg. To the south lies the Harz and the Saale-Unstrut Region, to the north the Altmark.

== Districts ==
- Landkreis Börde
- Landkreis Jerichower Land
- Salzlandkreis
- Landeshauptstadt Magdeburg
