= Grimme =

- Stadtteil of Zerbst
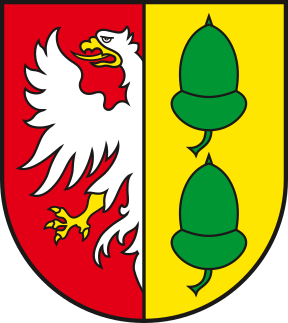
- Coat of arms
- Interactive map of Grimme
- Location within Germany Location within Saxony-Anhalt
- Coordinates: 52°1′N 12°16′E
- Country: Germany
- State: Saxony-Anhalt
- District: Anhalt-Bitterfeld
- Town: Zerbst

Area
  - Total: 28.77 km^{2} (11.11 sq mi)
- Elevation: 105 m (344 ft)

Population (2006-12-31)
  - Total: 176
  - Density: 6.12/km^{2} (15.8/sq mi)
- Time zone: UTC+01:00 (CET)
  - Summer (DST): UTC+02:00 (CEST)
- Postal codes: 39264
- Dialling codes: 039248
- Vehicle registration: ABI

Grimme (German pronunciation: [ɡʁɪmə]) is a village and a former municipality in the district of Anhalt-Bitterfeld, in Saxony-Anhalt, Germany.

Since 1 January 2010, it is part of the town Zerbst.
