= Straguth =

- Stadtteil of Zerbst
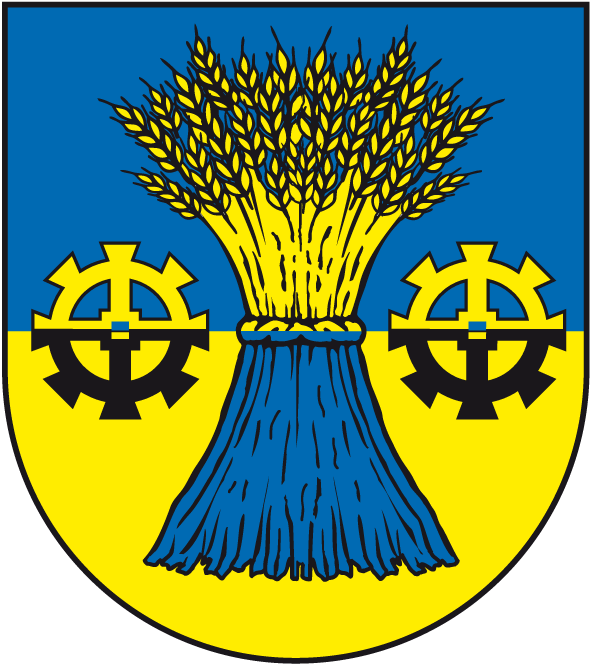
- Coat of arms
- Interactive map of Straguth
- Location within Germany Location within Saxony-Anhalt
- Coordinates: 52°1′N 12°10′E
- Country: Germany
- State: Saxony-Anhalt
- District: Anhalt-Bitterfeld
- Town: Zerbst

Area
  - Total: 21.38 km^{2} (8.25 sq mi)
- Elevation: 82 m (269 ft)

Population (2015)
  - Total: 239
  - Density: 11.2/km^{2} (29.0/sq mi)
- Time zone: UTC+01:00 (CET)
  - Summer (DST): UTC+02:00 (CEST)
- Postal codes: 39264
- Dialling codes: 039248
- Vehicle registration: ABI

Straguth is a village and a former municipality in the district of Anhalt-Bitterfeld, in Saxony-Anhalt, Germany. Since 1 January 2010, it is part of the town Zerbst. Its population is 239 (2015).
