= Dobritz =

- Stadtteil of Zerbst
- Coat of arms
- Interactive map of Dobritz
- Location within Germany Location within Saxony-Anhalt
- Coordinates: 52°1′N 12°13′E
- Country: Germany
- State: Saxony-Anhalt
- District: Anhalt-Bitterfeld
- Town: Zerbst

Area
  - Total: 15.45 km^{2} (5.97 sq mi)
- Elevation: 90 m (300 ft)

Population (2006-12-31)
  - Total: 308
  - Density: 19.9/km^{2} (51.6/sq mi)
- Time zone: UTC+01:00 (CET)
  - Summer (DST): UTC+02:00 (CEST)
- Postal codes: 39264
- Dialling codes: 039248
- Vehicle registration: ABI

Dobritz is a village and a former municipality in the district of Anhalt-Bitterfeld, in Saxony-Anhalt, Germany.

Since 1 January 2010, it has been part of the town of Zerbst.
