= Nutha =

- Stadtteil of Zerbst
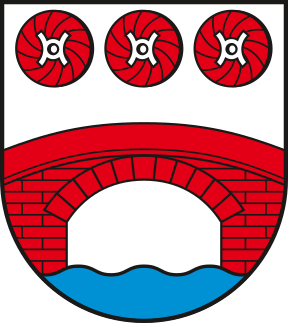
- Coat of arms
- Interactive map of Nutha
- Location within Germany Location within Saxony-Anhalt
- Coordinates: 51°57′47″N 12°0′46″E
- Country: Germany
- State: Saxony-Anhalt
- District: Anhalt-Bitterfeld
- Town: Zerbst

Area
  - Total: 9.42 km^{2} (3.64 sq mi)
- Elevation: 55 m (180 ft)

Population (2006-12-31)
  - Total: 292
  - Density: 31.0/km^{2} (80.3/sq mi)
- Time zone: UTC+01:00 (CET)
  - Summer (DST): UTC+02:00 (CEST)
- Postal codes: 39264
- Dialling codes: 039247
- Vehicle registration: ABI

Nutha (sometimes Gut Nutha) is a village and a former municipality in the district of Anhalt-Bitterfeld, in Saxony-Anhalt, Germany. Since 1 January 2010, it is part of the town Zerbst.

It was the birthplace (1909) of the writer and anti-Nazi resistance fighter Werner Keller.
