= Buhlendorf =

- Stadtteil of Zerbst
- Coat of arms
- Interactive map of Buhlendorf
- Location within Germany Location within Saxony-Anhalt
- Coordinates: 52°01′N 12°01′E
- Country: Germany
- State: Saxony-Anhalt
- District: Anhalt-Bitterfeld
- Town: Zerbst

Area
  - Total: 8.28 km^{2} (3.20 sq mi)
- Elevation: 87 m (285 ft)

Population (2006-12-31)
  - Total: 250
  - Density: 30/km^{2} (78/sq mi)
- Time zone: UTC+01:00 (CET)
  - Summer (DST): UTC+02:00 (CEST)
- Postal codes: 39264
- Dialling codes: 039246
- Vehicle registration: ABI

Buhlendorf (German pronunciation: [ˈbuːləndɔʁf]) is a village and a former municipality in the district of Anhalt-Bitterfeld, in Saxony-Anhalt, Germany.

Since 1 January 2010, it is part of the town Zerbst.

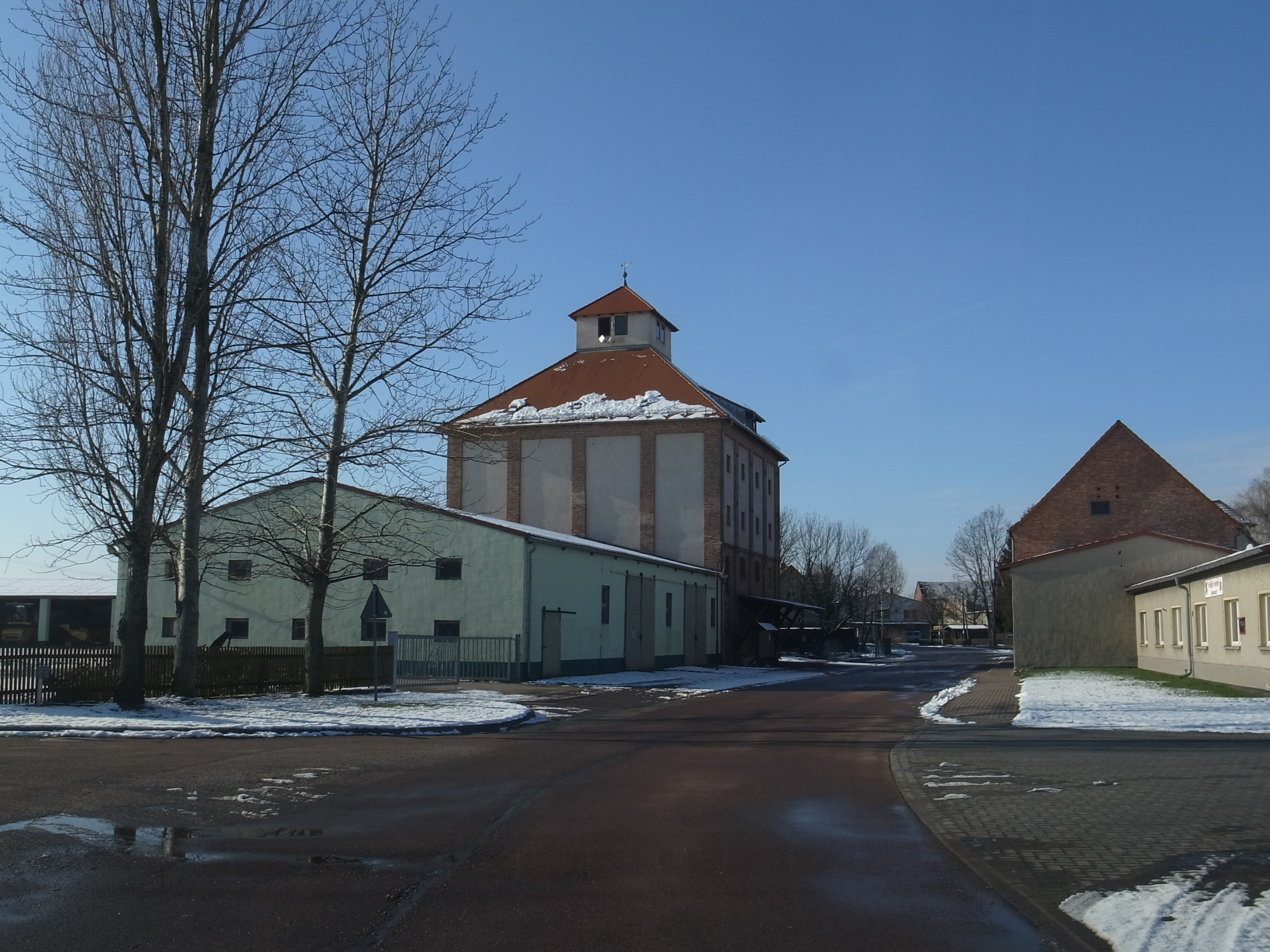

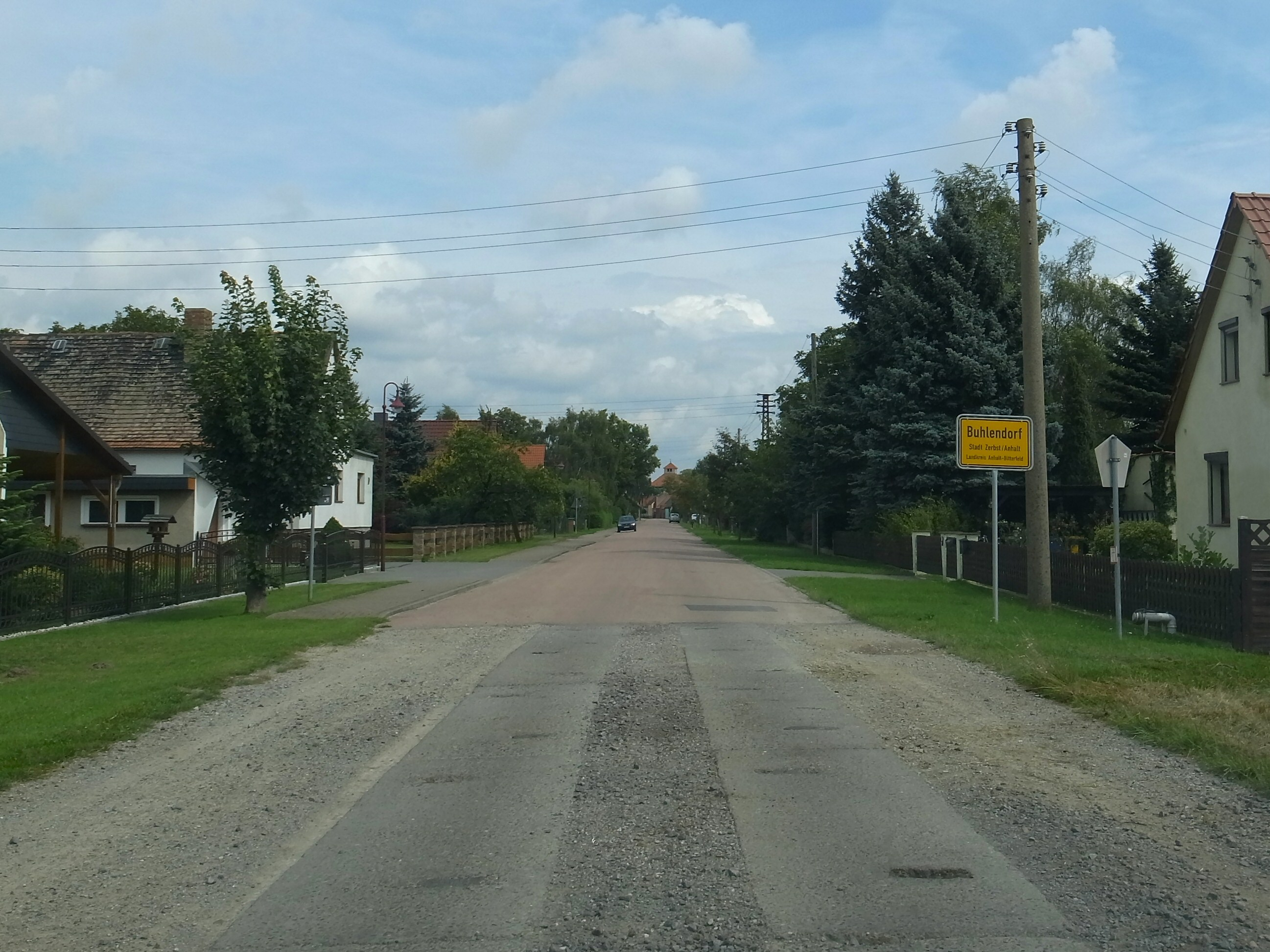
