= Zernitz =

- Stadtteil of Zerbst
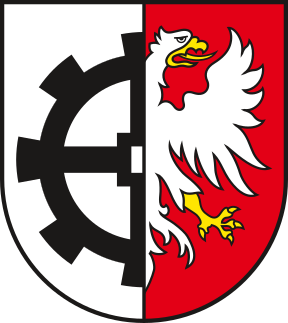
- Coat of arms
- Interactive map of Zernitz
- Location within Germany Location within Saxony-Anhalt
- Coordinates: 52°1′N 12°4′E
- Country: Germany
- State: Saxony-Anhalt
- District: Anhalt-Bitterfeld
- Town: Zerbst

Area
  - Total: 13.71 km^{2} (5.29 sq mi)
- Elevation: 70 m (230 ft)

Population (2006-12-31)
  - Total: 264
  - Density: 19.3/km^{2} (49.9/sq mi)
- Time zone: UTC+01:00 (CET)
  - Summer (DST): UTC+02:00 (CEST)
- Postal codes: 39264
- Dialling codes: 039246
- Vehicle registration: ABI

Zernitz is a village and a former municipality in the district of Anhalt-Bitterfeld, in Saxony-Anhalt, Germany.

Since 1 January 2010, it is part of the town Zerbst.
