= Nedlitz =

- Stadtteil of Zerbst
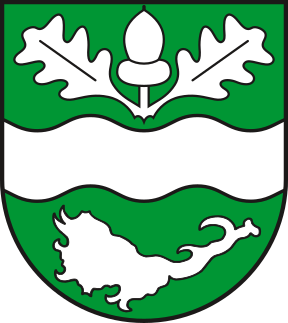
- Coat of arms
- Interactive map of Nedlitz
- Location within Germany Location within Saxony-Anhalt
- Coordinates: 52°4′N 12°13′E
- Country: Germany
- State: Saxony-Anhalt
- District: Anhalt-Bitterfeld
- Town: Zerbst

Area
  - Total: 33.20 km^{2} (12.82 sq mi)
- Elevation: 98 m (322 ft)

Population (2008-12-31)
  - Total: 641
  - Density: 19.3/km^{2} (50.0/sq mi)
- Time zone: UTC+01:00 (CET)
  - Summer (DST): UTC+02:00 (CEST)
- Postal codes: 39264
- Dialling codes: 039243
- Vehicle registration: ABI

Nedlitz is a village and a former municipality in the district of Anhalt-Bitterfeld, in Saxony-Anhalt, Germany. Since 1 January 2010, it is part of the town Zerbst.

== History ==
The village was founded near the northern wells of the river Nuthe at the heights of the Fläming Heaths. The border of today's Brandenburg and Sachsen-Anhalt runs right next the area that is mostly covered by woods around the village center.

Nedlitz is situated about 15 km to the northeast of the town Zerbst. It has been part of Principality of Anhalt-Zerbst throughout early history. The principality was divided into three parts in 1796 where the village happened to be part of the northeastern Anhalt-Dessau (later Anhalt-Zerbst) district.

On 1 July 1950 the nearby village of Hagendorf was amalgamated into Nedlitz. The incorporated village area was independent until 2009 when it was added to the town management of Zerbst. The last census showed the village to have an area of 33.2 km² with 641 inhabitants (31 December 2008).

== Gallery ==
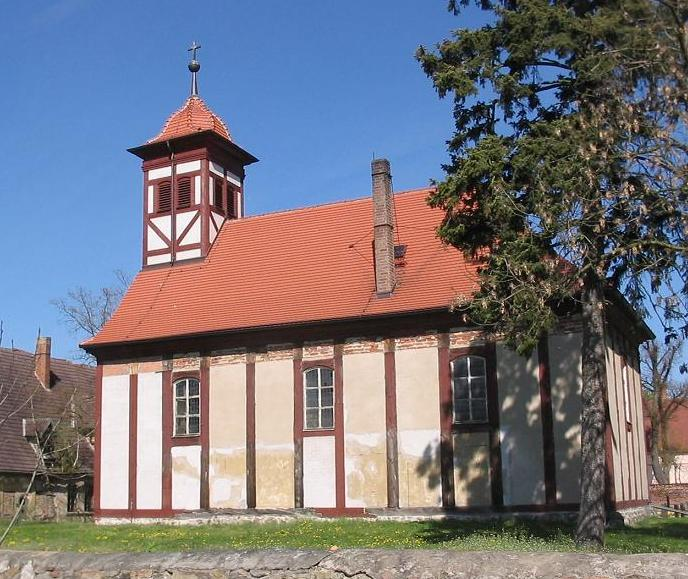
Church of Nedlitz

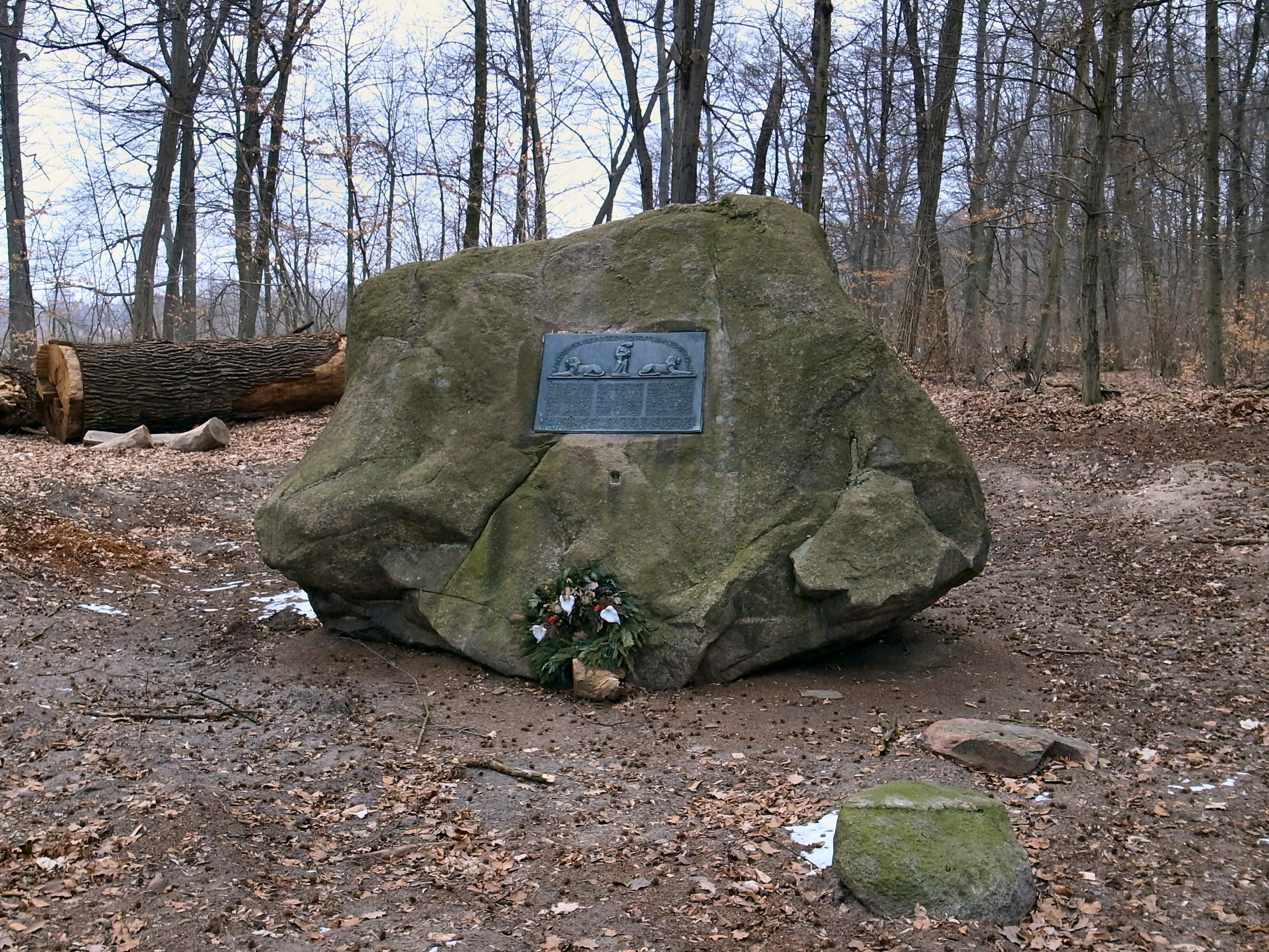
erratic boulder, with a memorial for WW1 deaths

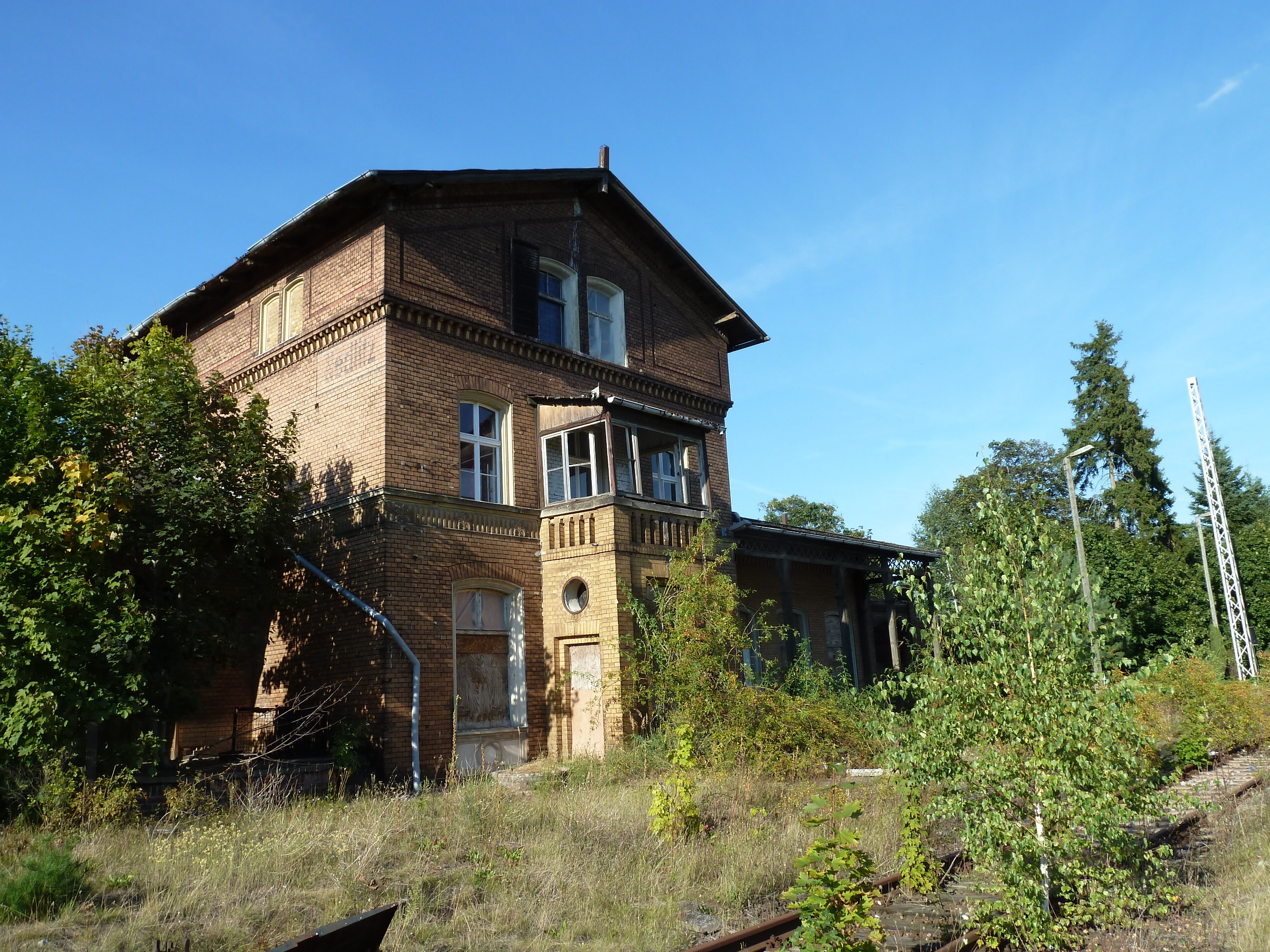
old train station of Nedlitz
