= Walternienburg =

- Stadtteil of Zerbst
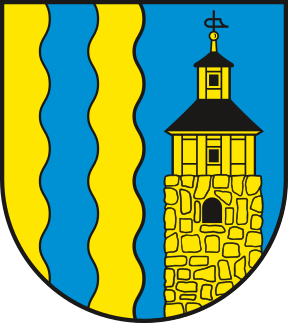
- Coat of arms
- Interactive map of Walternienburg
- Location within Germany Location within Saxony-Anhalt
- Coordinates: 51°58′N 11°55′E
- Country: Germany
- State: Saxony-Anhalt
- District: Anhalt-Bitterfeld
- Town: Zerbst

Area
  - Total: 18.77 km^{2} (7.25 sq mi)
- Elevation: 53 m (174 ft)

Population (2008-12-31)
  - Total: 519
  - Density: 27.7/km^{2} (71.6/sq mi)
- Time zone: UTC+01:00 (CET)
  - Summer (DST): UTC+02:00 (CEST)
- Postal codes: 39264
- Dialling codes: 039247
- Vehicle registration: ABI

Walternienburg is a village and a former municipality in the district of Anhalt-Bitterfeld, in Saxony-Anhalt, Germany. Since 1 January 2010, it is part of the town Zerbst.

The Barby Ferry, a cable ferry across the Elbe, links Walternienburg with Barby.
