= Steutz =

- Stadtteil of Zerbst
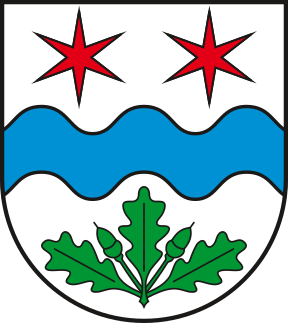
- Coat of arms
- Interactive map of Steutz
- Location within Germany Location within Saxony-Anhalt
- Coordinates: 51°52′N 12°4′E
- Country: Germany
- State: Saxony-Anhalt
- District: Anhalt-Bitterfeld
- Town: Zerbst

Area
  - Total: 32.29 km^{2} (12.47 sq mi)
- Elevation: 70 m (230 ft)

Population (2006-12-31)
  - Total: 947
  - Density: 29.3/km^{2} (76.0/sq mi)
- Time zone: UTC+01:00 (CET)
  - Summer (DST): UTC+02:00 (CEST)
- Postal codes: 39264
- Dialling codes: 039244
- Vehicle registration: ABI

Steutz (German pronunciation: [ˈʃtɔʏts]) is a village and a former municipality in the district of Anhalt-Bitterfeld, in Saxony-Anhalt, Germany.

Since January 1, 2010, it is part of the town Zerbst.
