= Reuden =

- Stadtteil of Zerbst
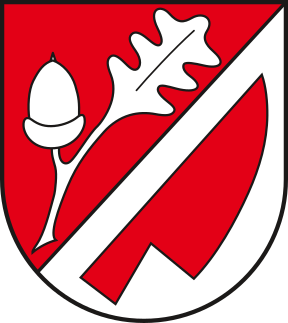
- Coat of arms
- Interactive map of Reuden
- Location within Germany Location within Saxony-Anhalt
- Coordinates: 52°4′N 12°18′E
- Country: Germany
- State: Saxony-Anhalt
- District: Anhalt-Bitterfeld
- Town: Zerbst

Area
  - Total: 12.71 km^{2} (4.91 sq mi)
- Elevation: 108 m (354 ft)

Population (2006-12-31)
  - Total: 312
  - Density: 24.5/km^{2} (63.6/sq mi)
- Time zone: UTC+01:00 (CET)
  - Summer (DST): UTC+02:00 (CEST)
- Postal codes: 39264
- Dialling codes: 039243
- Vehicle registration: ABI

Reuden (German pronunciation: [ˈʁɔʏdn̩]; official name: Reuden/Anhalt) is a village and a former municipality in the district of Anhalt-Bitterfeld, in Saxony-Anhalt, Germany. It is around 50 km east of Magdeburg, and around 100 km south-west of Berlin.

Since 1 January 2010, it is part of the town Zerbst.
