= Bornum, Saxony-Anhalt =

Bornum
- Stadtteil of Zerbst
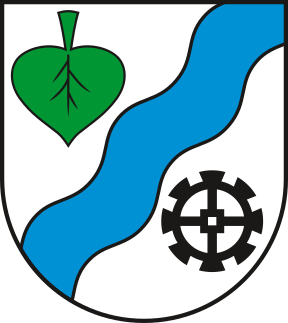
- Coat of arms
- Interactive map of Bornum
- Location within Germany Location within Saxony-Anhalt
- Coordinates: 51°58′N 12°11′E
- Country: Germany
- State: Saxony-Anhalt
- District: Anhalt-Bitterfeld
- Town: Zerbst

Area
  - Total: 20.37 km^{2} (7.86 sq mi)
- Elevation: 80 m (260 ft)

Population (2006-12-31)
  - Total: 546
  - Density: 26.8/km^{2} (69.4/sq mi)
- Time zone: UTC+01:00 (CET)
  - Summer (DST): UTC+02:00 (CEST)
- Postal codes: 39264
- Dialling codes: 039248
- Vehicle registration: ABI

Bornum (German pronunciation: [ˈbɔʁnʊm]) is a village and a former municipality in the district of Anhalt-Bitterfeld, in Saxony-Anhalt, Germany. Since 1 January 2010, it is part of the town Zerbst.
