= Anhalt-Zerbst =

Coordinates: 52°00′N 12°05′E

- District
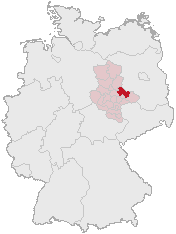
- Country: Germany
- State: Saxony-Anhalt
- Disbanded: 2007-07-01
- Capital: Zerbst

Area
  - Total: 1,225 km^{2} (473 sq mi)

Population (1999)
  - Total: 79,500
  - Density: 65/km^{2} (170/sq mi)
- Time zone: UTC+01:00 (CET)
  - Summer (DST): UTC+02:00 (CEST)
- Vehicle registration: AZE
- Website: http://www.anhalt-zerbst.de

Anhalt-Zerbst was a district in Saxony-Anhalt, Germany. It is bounded by (from the north and clockwise) the districts Potsdam-Mittelmark (Brandenburg) and Wittenberg, the city of Dessau and the districts of Köthen, Schönebeck and Jerichower Land.

== History ==
While Zerbst is a small town today, together with Dessau it was one of the two central cities of Anhalt. When the state of Anhalt was dissolved in 1603, one of the successor states was the principality of Anhalt-Zerbst. It was a small state with almost no political power. In 1793 the line of the princes became extinct, and Anhalt-Zerbst was annexed by the neighbouring principality of Anhalt-Dessau.

The present district was established in 1994 by merging the former districts of Zerbst and Roßlau with parts of the former district of Gräfenhainichen. Its borders are roughly identical with the ancient principality.

The district of Anhalt-Zerbst was dissolved in 2007 and divided into the new districts of Anhalt-Bitterfeld, Jerichower Land and Wittenberg.

Russian empress, Catherine the Great, was, by birth, a princess of Anhalt-Zerbst.

== Geography ==
Anhalt-Zerbst comprises plain countryside north of the Elbe River. The Elbe enters the district in the east, runs through the southeastern part and then forms the southern and western border of Anhalt-Zerbst. The Elbe banks within the district are part of the Biosphere Reserve Middle Elbe. The north is occupied by the southern portions of the Fläming plateau.

== Coat of arms ==
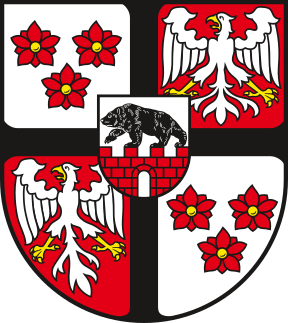
The coat of arms displays:
- top left and bottom right: three red roses, the arms of the former principality of Anhalt-Zerbst
- centre: a black bear on a red wall, symbolising Albert I of Brandenburg (called "Albert the Bear"), who ruled the region in the 12th century
- top right and bottom left: the heraldic eagle of the county of Lindau, which existed in the region in the 14th century

== Towns and municipalities ==
Towns
1. Roßlau
2. Zerbst
Verwaltungsgemeinschaften
1. Coswig (incl. town Coswig)
2. Elbe-Ehle-Nuthe (incl. towns Lindau and Loburg)
3. Wörlitzer Winkel (incl. towns Oranienbaum and Wörlitz)

== See also ==
- Principality of Anhalt-Zerbst
