= Nuthe (Elbe) =

River in Germany

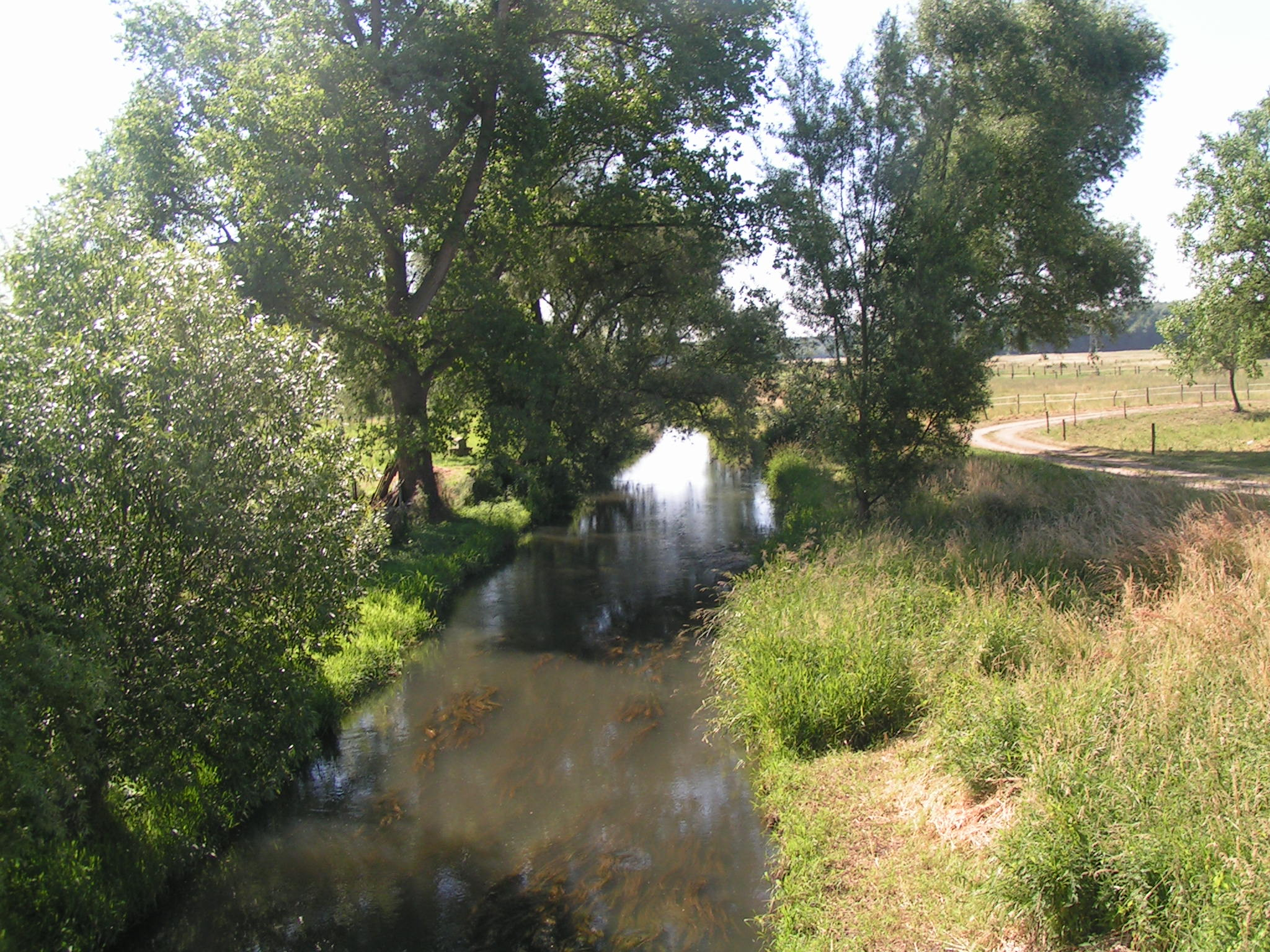

Location
- Country: Germany
- States: Saxony-Anhalt

Physical characteristics
- Mouth
  - location: Elbe
  - coordinates: 51°59′51″N 11°53′26″E

Basin features
- Progression: Elbe→ North Sea

The Nuthe is a small river in Saxony-Anhalt, Germany. It flows into the Elbe north of Barby.

== See also ==
- List of rivers of Saxony-Anhalt
