= Wolfen, Germany =

Town in Bitterfeld-Wolfen, Saxony-Anhalt, Germany

Wolfen
- Stadtteil of Bitterfeld-Wolfen
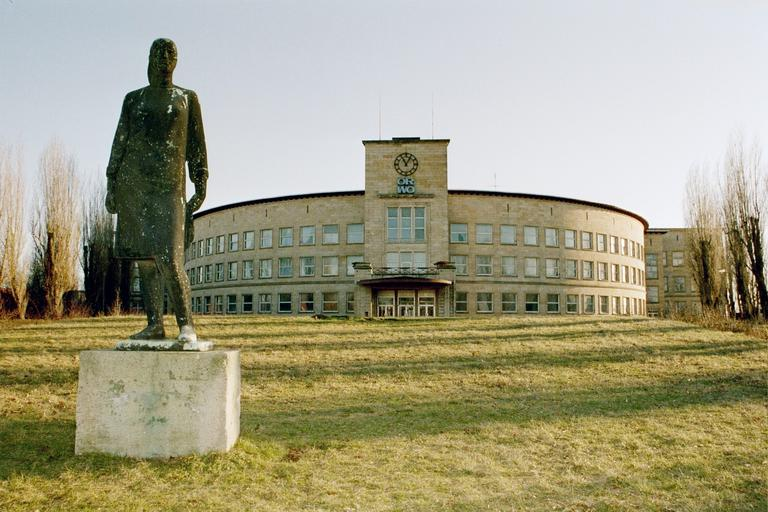
- Gebäude 041, since 2010 town hall of Bitterfeld-Wolfen

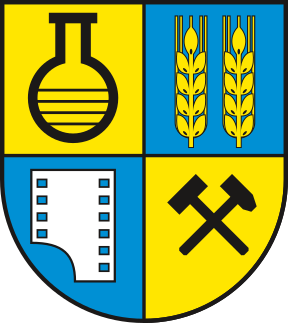
- Coat of arms
- Interactive map of Wolfen
- Location within Germany Location within Saxony-Anhalt
- Coordinates: 51°39′41″N 12°16′20″E
- Country: Germany
- State: Saxony-Anhalt
- District: Anhalt-Bitterfeld
- Town: Bitterfeld-Wolfen

Area
  - Total: 23.13 km^{2} (8.93 sq mi)
- Elevation: 78 m (256 ft)

Population (2024-12-31)
  - Total: 15,214
  - Density: 657.8/km^{2} (1,704/sq mi)
- Time zone: UTC+01:00 (CET)
  - Summer (DST): UTC+02:00 (CEST)
- Postal codes: 06766
- Dialling codes: 03494
- Vehicle registration: ABI
- Website: Website

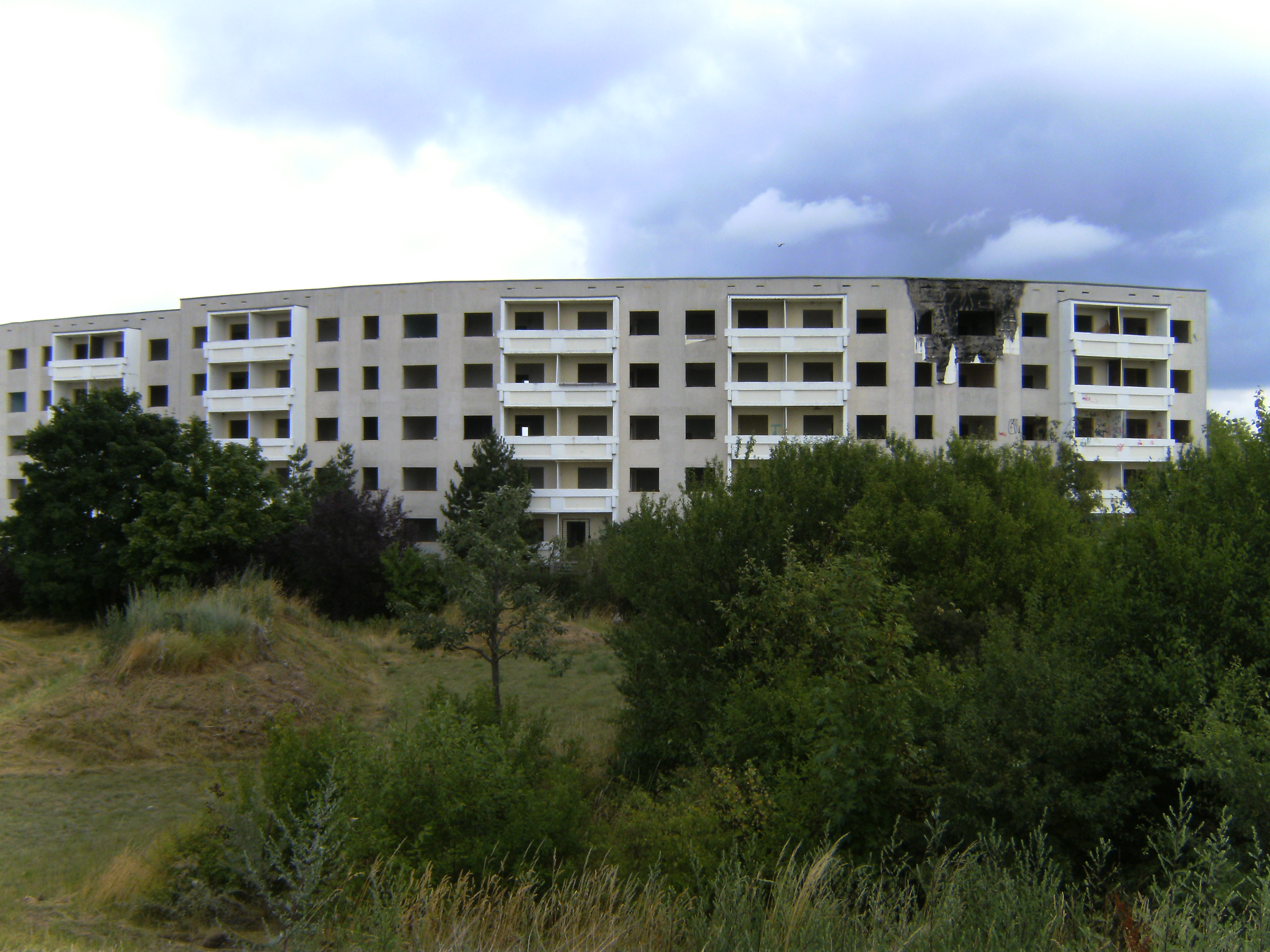
Abandoned Plattenbau, Wolfen-Nord.

Wolfen (German pronunciation: [ˈvɔlfn̩]) is a town in the district Anhalt-Bitterfeld, Saxony-Anhalt, Germany. Since 1 July 2007 it is part of the town Bitterfeld-Wolfen. It is situated approximately 6 kilometres northwest of Bitterfeld, and 20 kilometres south of Dessau.

== History ==
The first documentary mention of Wolfen was as Wulffen in 1400 in a fee (feudal tenure). The place name was named after a founder whose name began with Wolf. In 1846 lignite was found in the region which was mined and the current Silver Lake was developed from this mine. Later the area became a center of the German chemical industry.

In the early 1930s, an early photographic plate was produced by Agfa in Wolfen, and by 1936 the same company commercialized the more technically advanced Agfacolor Neu color transparency film, which had been developed in Wolfen.

During World War II hundreds of women, children, and men from countries under Nazi domination were forced to work in the IG-Farben factories. After the war, the rights to the Agfa brandname were lost to the West German company, and the Wolfen company's products were rebranded ORWO (ORiginal WOlfen). ORWO was one of the worldwide trademarks of East Germany (the GDR). During the GDR years, Wolfen became a dormitory community for people working at the Bitterfeld and Wolfen industrial plants (Filmfabrik Wolfen, Chemiekombinat Bitterfeld (including the former IG Farben factory, Farbenfabrik, Wolfen)), and the lignite mining company, BKK Bitterfeld (today: MIBRAG).

After German reunification, the whole area suffered from disinvestment, deindustrialization, and depopulation. Unemployment became a serious problem. As a result, the population decreased by approximately 50%. Since the 1990s industrial employment has rebounded, with investments by Bayer (the headquarters of Viverso is in the town), Hereaus, Q-Cells and Guardian Industries. Significant local concerns include Organica Feinchemie GmbH Wolfen.

=== Historical Population ===
As of 31 December, unless otherwise noted

- 1910 - 2,548
- 1933 - 6,520
- 1939 - 7,934
- 1946 - 11,458 (29. Oktober)
- 1950 - 11,750 (31. August)
- 1960 - 12,687
- 1981 - 39,131
- 1984 - 41,977
- 1990 - 43,900
- 1995 - 40,889
- 2000 - 31,025
- 2001 - 29,188
- 2002 - 27,844
- 2003 - 26,728
- 2004 - 25,661
- 2005 - 24,908
- 2008 - 22,764 (30.June)
- 2015 - 17,497 (31. March)
- 2017 - 16,449 (30. June)
- 2021 - 15,073
- 2024 - 15,214

Data since 1995: Statistisches Landesamt Sachsen-Anhalt

== Notable people ==
- Wolfgang Haubold (born 1937), chemist and university's president
- Heinz Zander (born 1939), painter, draughtsman, graphic artist, illustrator and writer
- Lioba Winterhalder (1945–2012), set and costume designer
- Wolfgang Böhme (born 1949), handball player and coach
- Paul Werner Wagner (born 1948), literary scholar
- Petra Wust (born 1952), graduate engineer economist, Mayor of Wolfen and Bitterfeld-Wolfen
- Frank Lienert-Mondanelli (born 1955), actor and director
- Michael Stein (born 1956), pop singer
- Roger Pyttel (born 1957), swimmer
- Bernhard Hoff (born 1959), athlete and olympian
- Ulf Langheinrich (born 1960), visual artist and composer
- Manfred Wilde (born 1962), historian and Mayor of the City of Delitzsch
- Thomas Konietzko (born 1963), president, German Canoe Federation, Vice President, ICF
- Axel Andrae (born 1965), bassoonist
- Ralph Bock (born 1967), molecular biologist
- Iris Junik (1968–2009), actress
- René Tretschok (born 1968), professional football player and coach (Hallescher FC, Borussia Dortmund, Hertha BSC, FC Grün-Weiß Wolfen)
- Katrin Huß (born 1969), journalist and TV presenter
- Karen Forkel (born 1970), track and field athlete and an Olympic medal winner
- Doreen Nixdorf (born 1972), actress
- Hendrik Otto (born 1974), cook (two-Star Michelin)
- Denise Zich (born 1975), actress and singer
- Raik Dalgas (born 1976), artist and aphorist
- Julia Schmidt (born 1976), painter
- Christian Gille (born 1976), canoeist
- Ondrej Drescher (born 1977), painter
- Nadine Koppehel (born 1977), politician
- Gabriel Machemer (born 1977), writer and artist
- Yvonne Schuring (born 1978), canoeist
- André Rößler (born 1978), actor and director
- Hannes Loth (born 1981), politician
- Denny Jankowski (born 1983), politician
- Gregor Kiedorf (born 1985), engineer and lifeguard
- Marinus Schöberl (1985–2002), victim of extreme right violence
- Karolin Braunsberger-Reinhold (born 1986), politician, Member of the German Bundestag since 2021
- Daniel Roi (born 1987), politician, member of the State Parliament of Saxony-Anhalt since 2016
- Oliver Hampel (born 1985), football player
- Franziska Hentke (born 1989), swimmer
- Robin Sowa (born 1999), volleyball and beach volleyball player
