= NPX =

NPX or npx could refer to:

- The Numeric Processor Extension in x87
- npx, a command in npm
- Santa Cruz language, an Austronesian language spoken in the Solomon Islands
- Northeast Airlines, U.S. airline; see List of airline codes
- Nuplex Industries, by New Zealand Stock Exchange stock ticker
