= Viverso =

- Company type: GmbH
- Genre: Chemistry
- Founded: 1 January 2008 (1994)
- Defunct: 14.09.2016
- Fate: Merged with Allnex
- Headquarters: Bitterfeld-Wolfen, Germany
- Key people: Rüdiger Held
- Products: coating resins
- Revenue: € 110 million (2008)
- Number of employees: 150 (2008)
- Parent: Bayer
- Website: www.nuplex.com

Viverso is a subsidiary of the Bayer MaterialScience AG and produces the coatings raw material ranges Alkydal (Alkyd Resins), Roskydal (Unsaturated Polyester Resins) and Desmophen A (Hydroxyacrylates) as well as Levblend PC+ABS Recyclate. The headquarters of the company is in Bitterfeld-Wolfen/Saxony-Anhalt. Viverso started operations on 1 January 2008. Viverso sells its products exclusively online.

== Production site ==
Viverso is the successor of the resin factory of the Bayer Bitterfeld GmbH. Production started here in 1994. Besides the 3 Viverso product lines, the Bayer MaterialScience brands Bayhydrol and Desmodur are produced here. The facility is equipped with a pilot plant and a laboratory as well as raw material and final product storages. Viverso employs approximately 150 people. The plant is capable of producing up to 60.000 tons of resins per year. In October 2011, Bayer MaterialScience AG announced the sale of Viverso to Nuplex Industries. The purchase price is 75 million euros; all 165 employees will be taken over by Nuplex. In mid 2016, Viverso, now under the name of Nuplex, merged with Allnex. New combined headquarters are in Frankfurt am Main.

== Product range ==
=== Alkydal ===
Alkydal is a range of alkyd resins, which are used in the formulation of wood- and furniture coatings, parquet- and floor coatings, exterior wood coatings, DIY- and painter coatings as well as industrial coatings. Bayer started producing alkyd resins as early as in 1929.

=== Roskydal ===
Roskydal are unsaturated polyesters which are contained in wood- and furniture coatings, conventionally curing or UV curing, coatings for musical instruments and interior fittings as well as putties for wood, commercial vehicle, automotive, stone- and marble applications. The first Roskydal types have been introduced by Bayer in the 1950s.

=== Desmophen ===
Desmophen A is produced since the 1980s, and is the basis of 2-Component-Coating-Systems. In combination with several Bayer Desmodur N types Desmophen A is used in corrosion protection, wood- and furniture coatings, industrial- and plastics coatings as well as automotive primers, top coats and clear coats. Viverso also offers several high solid grades of Desmophen A. These contain less solvent, less volatile organic contents (VOC) and are therefore better for the environment.
