= Julia Schmidt =

German painter (born 1976)

- Born: 1976 (age 49–50); Wolfen, East Germany
- Education: Glasgow School of Art; Hochschule für Grafik und Buchkunst Leipzig
- Occupation: Painter
- Awards: Villa Romana Prize (2008)

Julia Schmidt (born 1976 in Wolfen) is a German painter.

She graduated from Glasgow School of Art and from Hochschule für Grafik und Buchkunst Leipzig. Schmidt exhibited at Union Gallery, and Casey Kaplan.

== Awards ==
- 2011 Villa Massimo
- 2009 Villa Romana Prize
- 2006 Kunstpreis der Sachsen LB, Leipzig
