= ORWO =

German film and magnetic tape company

- Type: Public
- Industry: Imaging
- Founded: 1909 (Wolfen plant), 1964 (ORWO)
- Headquarters: Wolfen, Germany
- Products: Photography film, motion picture film, archiving film

ORWO (for ORiginal WOlfen) is a brand of photographic film products, based in Wolfen, Germany.

ORWO was established in East Germany in 1964 as a brand for film and magnetic tape, mainly produced at the former VEB Filmfabrik Wolfen (now Chemical Park Bitterfeld-Wolfen). The Wolfen factory was established by AGFA (Aktien-Gesellschaft für Anilin-Fabrikation) in 1910. In 1936 Agfacolor Neu, the first modern colour film which incorporated dye couplers, was developed at the factory.

The division of Germany after World War II saw AGFA divided, into Agfa AG, Leverkusen in West Germany, and VEB Film- und Chemiefaserwerk Agfa Wolfen in East Germany, which eventually rebranded as ORWO. The company was privatised in 1990 as ORWO AG, but film production ceased at Wolfen in 1994 following the liquidation of the company, with its constituent parts closed or sold off. The Industry and Film Museum Wolfen now occupies part of the original factory.

One of the successor companies, FilmoTec GmbH, based in Wolfen, was founded in 1998 to produce high quality black and white cinema and technical films under the ORWO brand (trademark rights are held by ORWO Net GmbH). Currently, the ORWO film range incorporates negative film for motion picture production (UN 54 and N 75), duplicating film, print film, sound recording film, and film leaders for the processing and distribution business.

In 2020 FilmoTec was brought under common ownership with part of the film coating company InovisCoat GmbH, also based in Germany and with shared Agfa heritage, to offer films for the film industry under the ORWO brand. Subsequently these were branded "Original Wolfen".

== History ==
=== AGFA ===
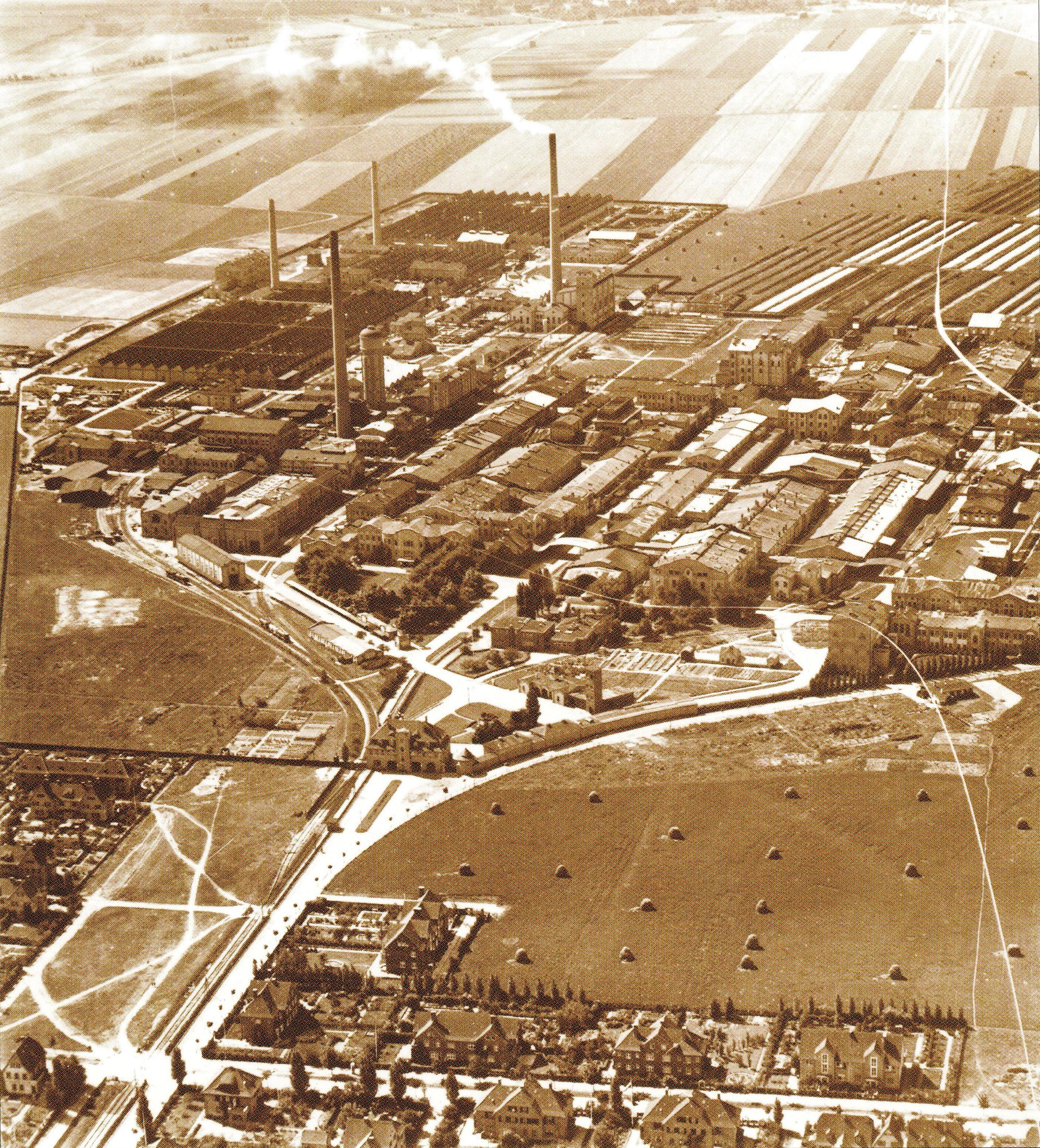
Agfa-Filmfabrik Wolfen 1929

A dye factory was established at the Rummelsburger See near Berlin in 1867. Its name was changed to AGFA (Actien-Gesellschaft für Anilin-Fabrikation) in 1873. The Wolfen factory was established by AGFA in 1910 and its original Leverkusen works (near Cologne) around the same time. In 1911, the first casting plant at Wolfen for polymer films (nitrocellulose) was built by AGFA. By 1925, with AGFA now part of the industrial conglomerate I.G. Farben, Wolfen was specialising in film production and Leverkusen photographic paper. In 1932, the process of making Triacetate Cellulose (TAC) film was patented at the Wolfen facility

The Agfa Wolfen plant developed Agfacolor Neu, the first modern colour film incorporating dye couplers, in 1936. It was simpler to process than its contemporary, Kodak Kodachrome from 1935.

==== After World War II ====
On 20 April 1945, following the defeat of Nazi Germany in World War II, the Wolfen plant was taken over by US forces, and important patents and other documents regarding the Agfacolor process were confiscated and handed over to Western competitors, such as Kodak and Ilford. As the plant was located in what was to become the Soviet zone of occupied Germany, the US forces then handed it over to the Soviet military administration, which dismantled large parts of the plant and moved it, with key German staff, to Svema in Shostka, Ukraine, where it formed the basis for the Soviet colour film industry.

AGFA was split into two companies each with one of the two plants: Agfa AG, Leverkusen in West Germany, and VEB Film- und Chemiefaserwerk Agfa Wolfen in East Germany. Agfa AG (Leverkusen), by then a subsidiary of Bayer, subsequently merged with Gevaert (based in Mortsel, Belgium) in 1964 to form Agfa-Gevaert.

=== ORWO (VEB Film- und Chemiefaserwerk Wolfen) ===
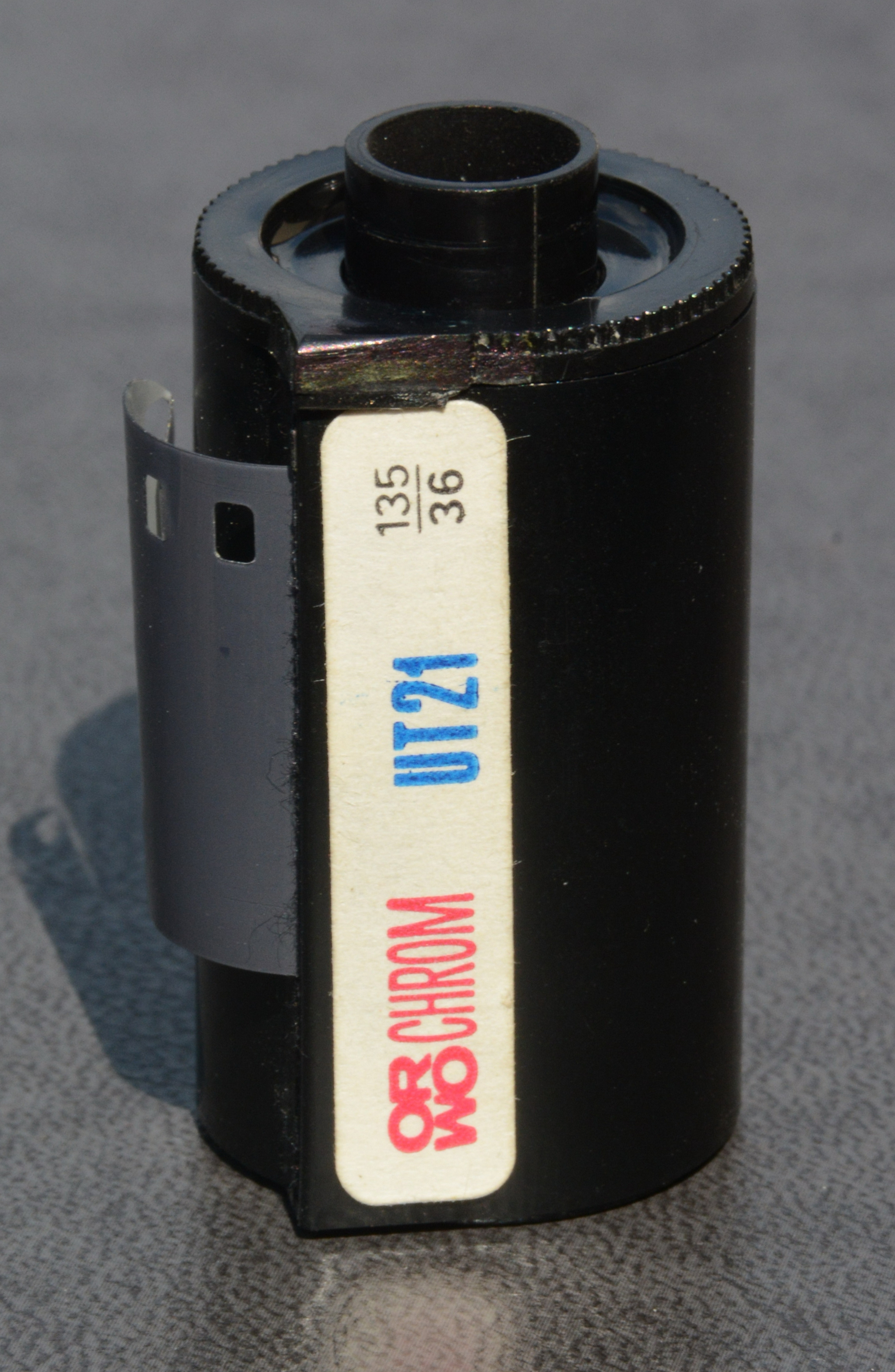
ORWOCHROM UT 21 - 135 film for colour slides (before 1990)

On the last day of 1953, Agfa Wolfen was returned to the GDR by the USSR as one of the last reparations companies. At this time the company still shared the AGFA trademark with Agfa Leverkusen and both companies produced films under the AGFA brand with the same names, such as Isopan F. To distinguish them, the film edge markings were L IF for Agfa Leverkusen, and W IF for Agfa Wolfen. Trading of materials however continued between plants.

In 1953 in a trade agreement it was agreed that VEB Film- und Chemiefaserwerk Agfa Wolfen would have the sole rights to the AGFA brand in Eastern Europe, and Agfa AG would retain sole rights to the AGFA brand in the rest of the world. This hampered Wolfen's exports and therefore after 1964 films from Wolfen were rebranded ORWO (ORiginal WOlfen) and the factory was renamed to VEB Filmfabrik Wolfen.

After the formation of the combine VEB Fotochemisches Kombinat Wolfen in 1970, the VEB Filmfabrik Wolfen became its leading factory. Factories integrated into the new Fotochemisches Kombinat were VEB Fotopapierwerk Dresden, VEB Fotopapierwerk Wernigerode, VEB Gelatinewerk Calbe, VEB Fotochemische Werke Berlin and the VEB Foto- und Lichtpauspapierwerk Berlin. The now Kombinat also began developing and producing other information recording materials, such as magnetic, video, and computer tapes. Later VEB Magnetbandfabrik Dessau and VEB Galfütex Schmölln (in 1982 renamed to VEB ORWO-Plast Schmölln) were joined to the Fotochemisches Kombinat Wolfen.

ORWO-branded 35mm colour slide film became available in the United Kingdom in the 1970s through magazine advertisements for mail order suppliers. It was a cheaper alternative to the mainstream brands available at the time.

ORWO prepared the changeover from Agfacolor to C-41, similar to considerations in the USSR, but had not completed it by the end of the GDR, which led to decreasing sales figures in western countries, where the Kodak C-41 process dominated the market.

In 1989, at its peak, a total of 14,500 employees were employed at the Wolfen site, encompassing an area of 165 hectares. They produced 40 million square meters of base material, of which 50 percent was processed to raw film. 200 different film stocks were made, converted to over 2500 products. The production height of magnetic recording materials was 2 million square meters, and in the chemical fibre sector, around 100,000 tons of various pulp, viscose products and special products were delivered.

==== Privatisation and Breakup ====
Following German reunification in 1990 the holding company was privatised as ORWO AG with Folienwerk Wolfen GmbH an early spin off. The Treuhand liquidated the company in 1994 and film production ceased. Attempts were made to revive the company and in 1995, Berlin-based photo merchant Heinrich Mandermann joined ORWO, and on 1 April 1996 ORWO films were put back on the market. However, they were no longer produced locally, merely assembled from products from other manufacturers such as Forte and Ilford. Due to the owner's illness the company was again insolvent in 1997.

A number of separate successor companies emerged from the remnants of the former industrial behemoth, all suppliers to the optical, electrical and film industries:

- Folienwerk Wolfen GmbH founded 1991, PET films for packaging, printing, medical and industrial uses.
- Organica Feinchemie GmbH Wolfen, founded in 1995, organic fine chemistry.
- FEW Chemicals GmbH, founded 1997, speciality and fine chemistry.
- Island Polymer Industries GmbH, founded 1998, Triacetate Cellulose (TAC) film production using former ORWO Wolfen facility, for photographic (film base) and optical markets, largest cast film manufacturer in Europe.
- ORWO FilmoTec GmbH, founded 1998, Cine films and related technical films.
- ORWO Net AG, founded 1999, Digital photo supplies, photofinishing.

ORWO Net GmbH retained the rights to the ORWO trademark for a variety of photographic products.

=== FilmoTec GmbH ===
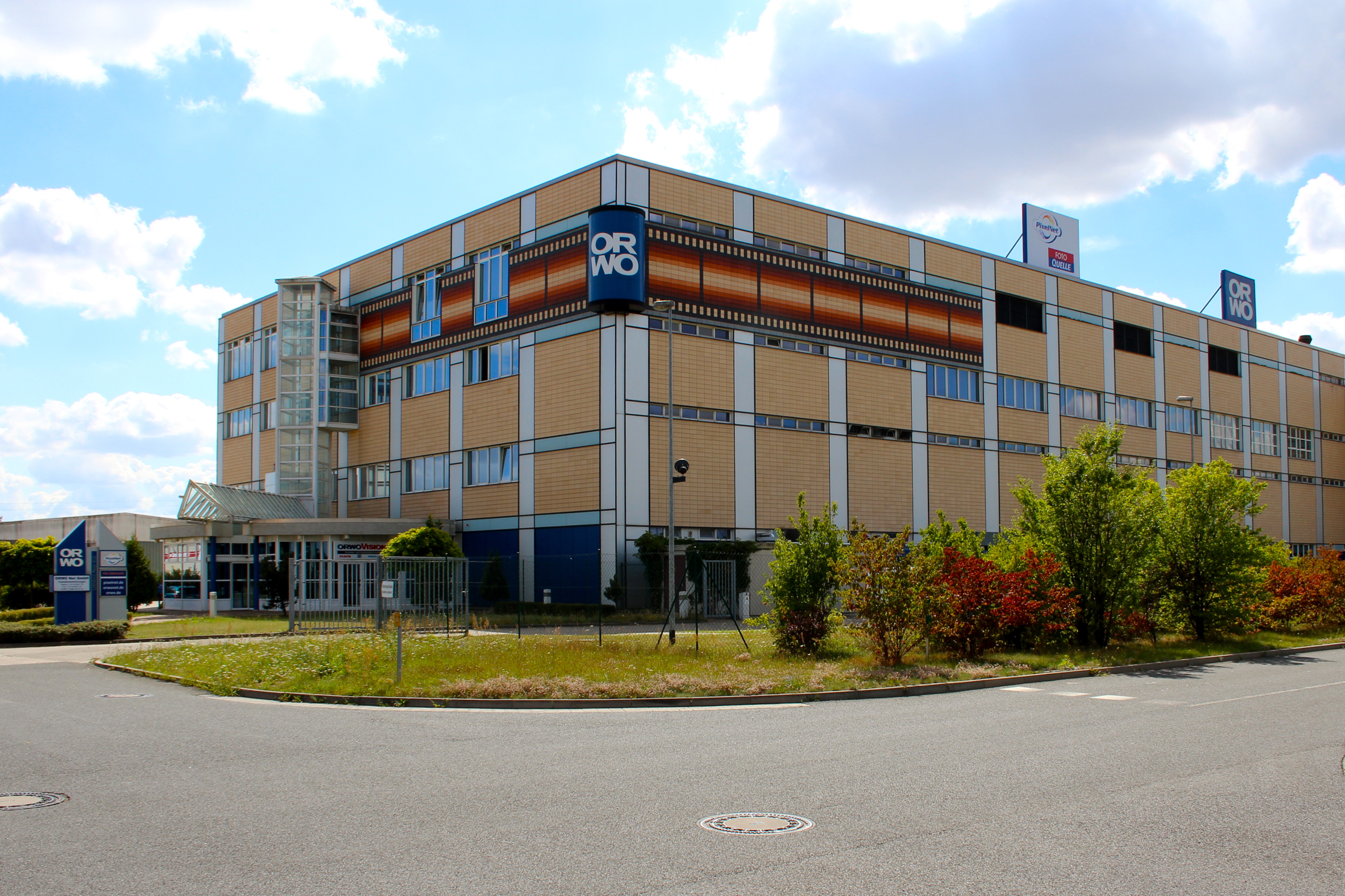
ORWO FilmoTec in 2012

The FilmoTec GmbH was formed in 1998 to continue to manufacture a range of black and white camera and technical films for motion picture use under the ORWO brand. Film coating was contracted out, to Ilford and later InovisCoat. In 2020, twenty employees work in the areas of research, development, production, configuration, and distribution of ORWO black and white films.

Products are particularly aimed towards the technical needs of the world's archiving, motion picture, and holographic industries. FilmoTec is, with Kodak, now one of only two companies still producing black and white films for motion picture use.

In partnership with ORWO North America, ORWO film currently supplies all US Library of Congress black and white industrial films, in addition to high-profile archival clients like the Smithsonian and MOMA. For example, black and white movies that have been selected by the US Library of Congress for archival copy preservation in the last five years have been most likely reprocessed onto ORWO film.

=== Seal 1818 GmbH Ownership ===
In 2020 FilmoTec was brought under common ownership with film coating company InovisCoat, based in Monheim am Rhein, Germany to offer products for the film industry under the traditional ORWO brand, both companies sharing AGFA heritage. In particular, for the first time since the liquidation of ORWO AG in 1994, the new ownership structure with Filmotec and InovisCoat (together with a number of other companies) reunites the ORWO films, their intellectual property, formulas, and research and development, with access to film manufacturing capability.

InovisCoat was founded by former employees of the consumer film division of Agfa-Gevaert, with its film coating plant based at Leverkusen, Germany which was spun off into a new company Agfa-Photo in 2004. The company (Agfa-Photo GmbH) folded a year later in 2005, although a separate holding company still retains the licence rights to the Agfa-Photo brand. InovisCoat brought together technical expertise in film emulsions and coating with acquisition of one of the former Leverkusen wide coating machines for film production, and a smaller narrow coating machine for testing, relocated to new premises in Monnheim on Rhein, the new smaller scale facility capable of multilayer film coating for both photographic and other applications. It manufactures coated films for a number of companies including Polaroid B.V., ADOX, Bergger, Lomography and ORWO Filmotec. The company was subsequently split into two parts in 2012: InovisProject owning the assets which was acquired by its major customer Polaroid B.V; and InovisCoat Photo, later renamed back to InovisCoat, having access to the equipment, but owning no assets.

The companies being brought together under the ORWO name (the holding company Seal 1818 GmbH, FilmoTec GmbH and InovisCoat GmbH) underwent an organised restructure in 2022, to enable the introduction of new working practices and products. It was originally proposed to launch new products under the ORWO name and Logo, this was replaced by "Original Wolfen", as ORWO Net GmbH still holds all brand rights.

Filmotec announced the introduction of two new films to the market in 2022, a new black & white film for still camera use 'NP 100' and a new colour cine film stock 'NC 500' using ECN-2 development process, which would provide cinematographers with an alternative to the Kodak Vision3 colour camera stocks.

=== Optik Oldschool Ownership ===
In July 2026 Chris Vandebroek co-founder of lab and film brand Optik Oldschool, based in Dusseldorf acquired Filomotec GmbH and InovisCoat GmbH from Jake Seal. The brand had previously released Opticolor 200, produced by InovisCoat, alongside the planned Original Wolfen 200 colour film, that never commercially launched. They launched a new film OptiMono 100 produced by Filmotec later the same month.

== Current products ==
=== Black & white camera film ===
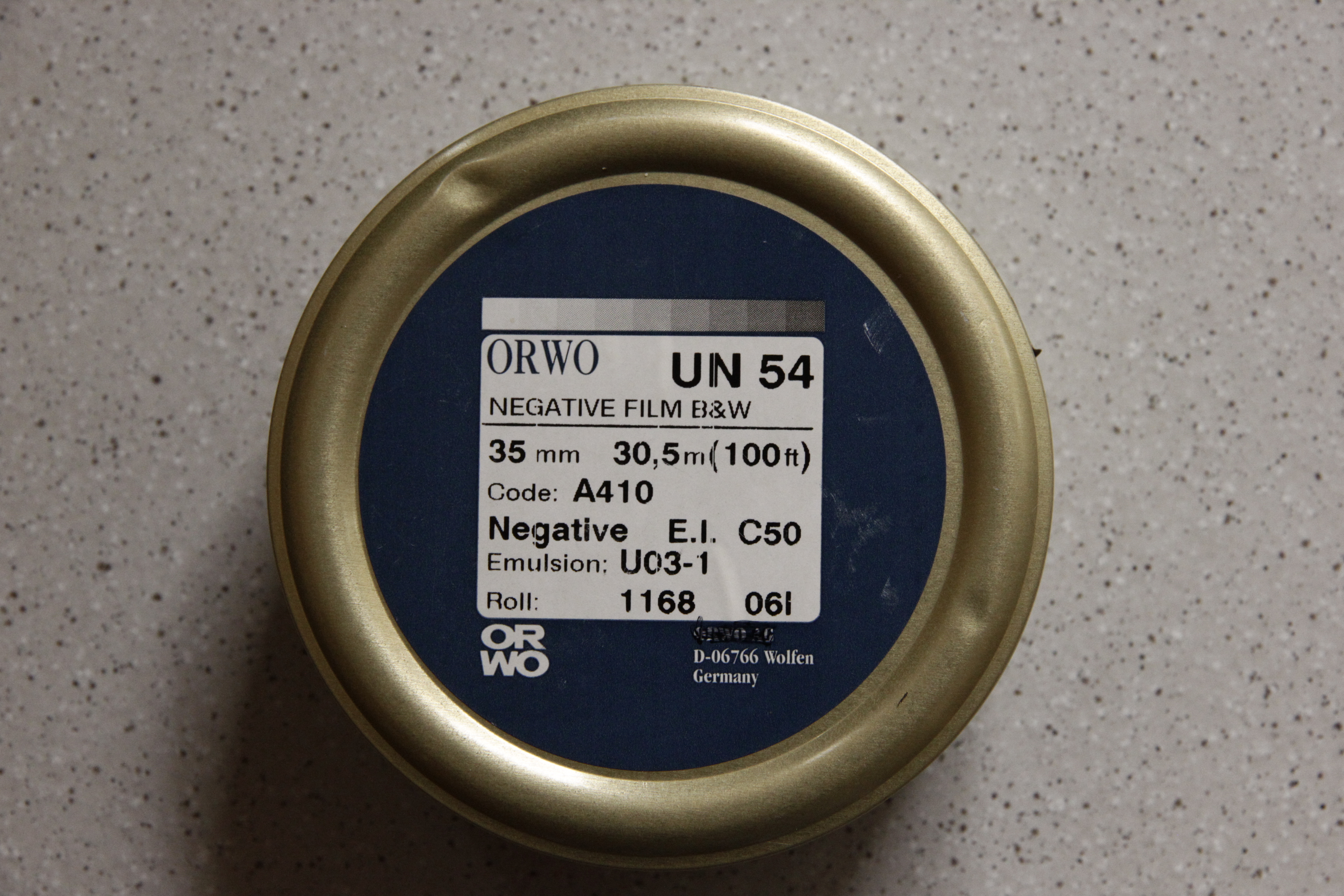
ORWO UN 54 in 30,5 m / 100 ft can (ORWO FilmoTec GmbH, 2016)

- U N54, Universal Negative film ISO 100/21°, panchromatic medium-speed black and white negative camera film for both outdoor and indoor usage. Formats: 16 mm/35 mm, 122 m/400 ft (16 mm/35 mm) on core and 305 m/1000 ft on core (35 mm).
- N 75, Negative film ISO 400/27°, fast black and white panchromatic camera film for both outdoor and indoor usage. Formats: 16 mm/35 mm, 30.5 m/100 ft, 122 m/400 ft (16 mm/35 mm) on core and 305 m/1000 ft on core (35 mm).

The UN 54 and N 75 motion picture camera films are also widely repackaged by third parties as still camera film.

=== Colour camera film ===
- NC 500, ISO 400/27°, colour film. Formats: 16 mm (100 ft & 400 ft) & 35 mm (400 ft, 1000 ft, 2000 ft)
- NC 400, ISO 400/27°, colour film. Format 16 mm (100 ft & 400 ft)

=== Still camera films ===
Black and white films

- Original Wolfen NP 100
- Original Wolfen P 400
- Original Wolfen Cine UN 54
- Original Wolfen Cine DP 31 (discontinued, stock only)
- Original Wolfen Cine DN 21 (discontinued, stock only)
- Original Wolfen Cine PF 2 (discontinued, stock only)

Colour films

- Original Wolfen Color NC 500
- Original Wolfen Color NC 400

=== Other products ===
- Laboratory films
- Duplicating films
- Sound recording films
- Holographic films
- Leader films
- Special films

== Discontinued products ==
=== ORWO (VEB Filmfabrik Wolfen) ===
- Still camera film
- Magnetic tape
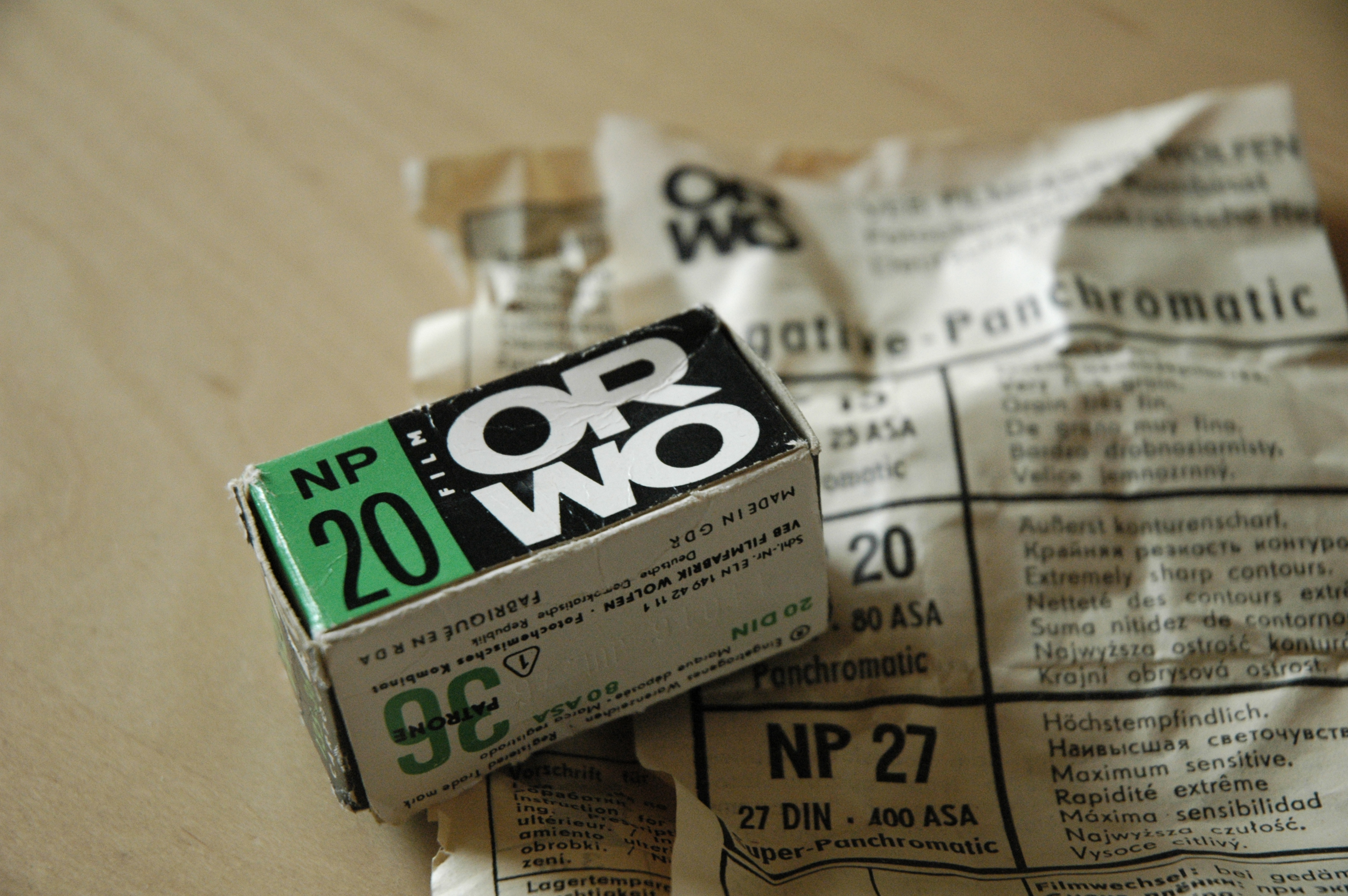
ORWO NP 20 (before 1980s)

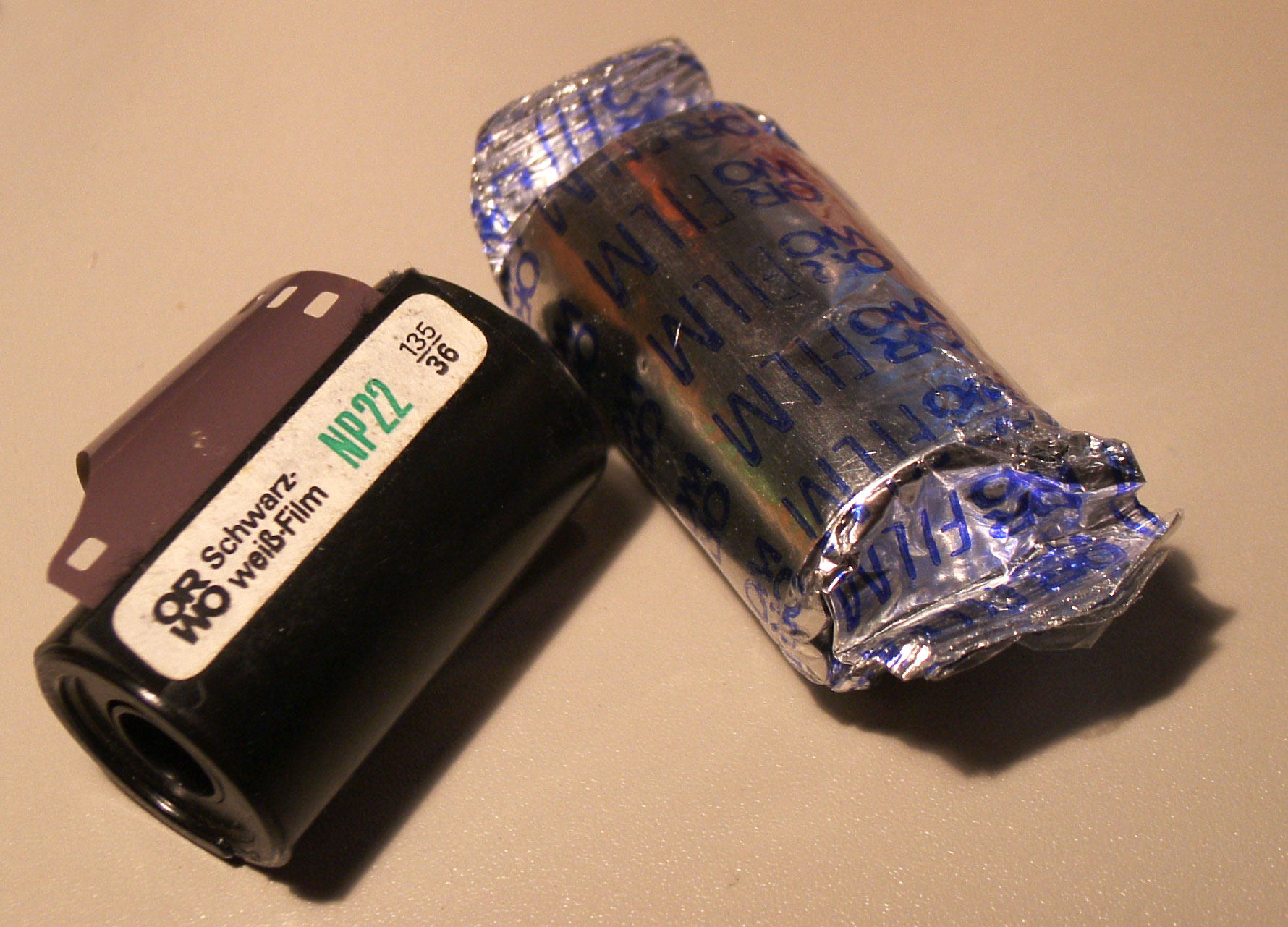
ORWO NP 22 (before 1990)

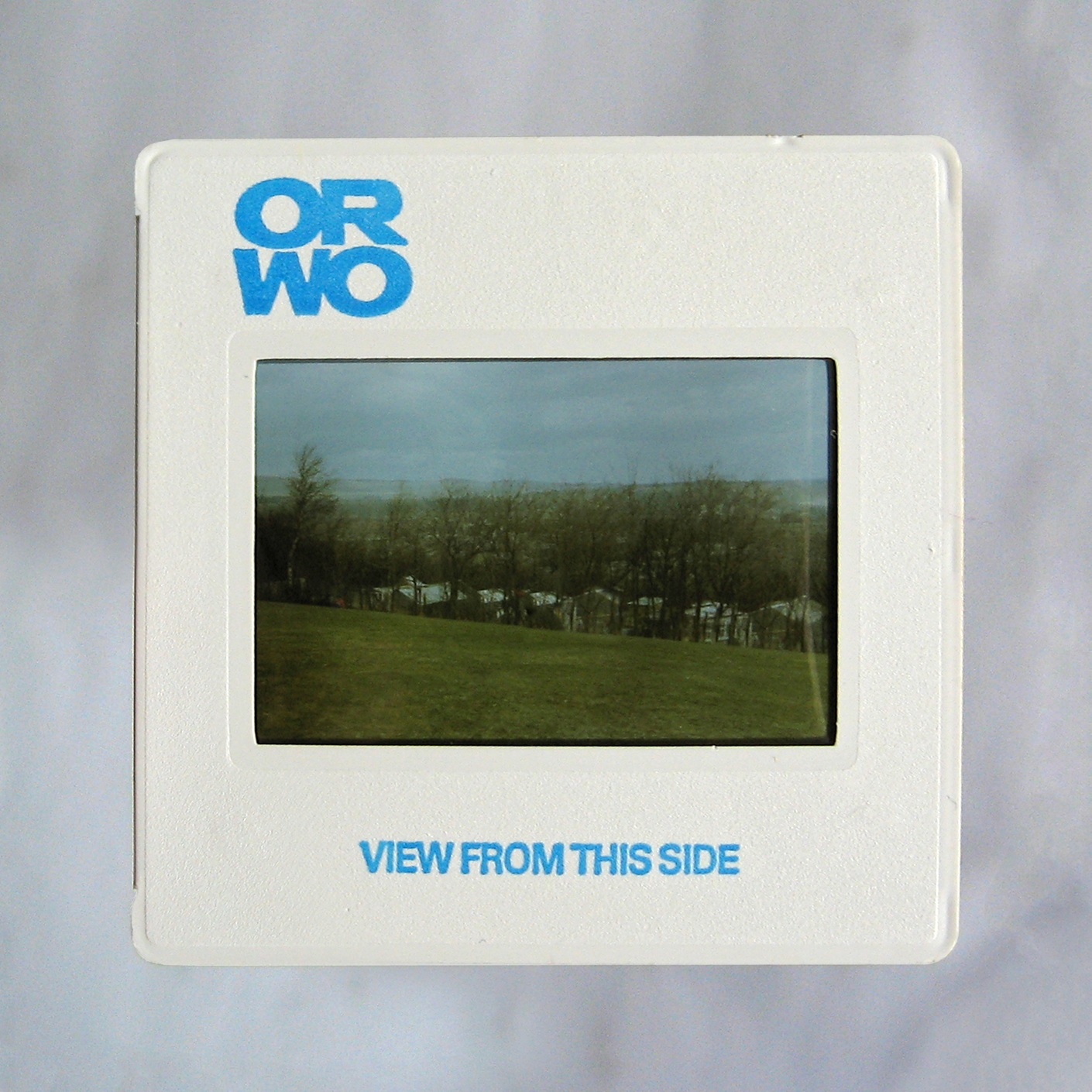
1980s ORWOCHROM Reversal film slide taken in UK (before 1990)

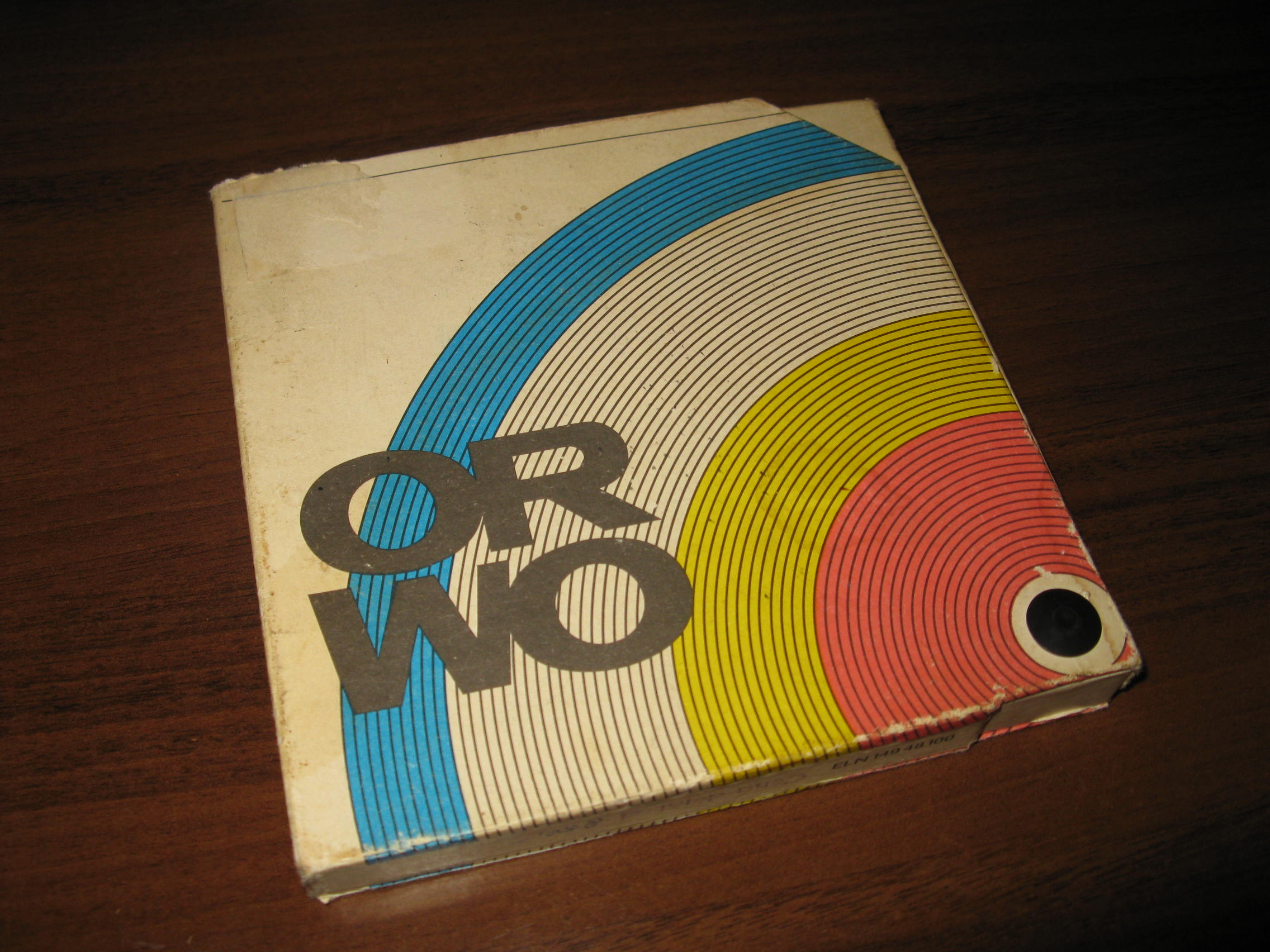
Magnetic tape packaging (before 1990)

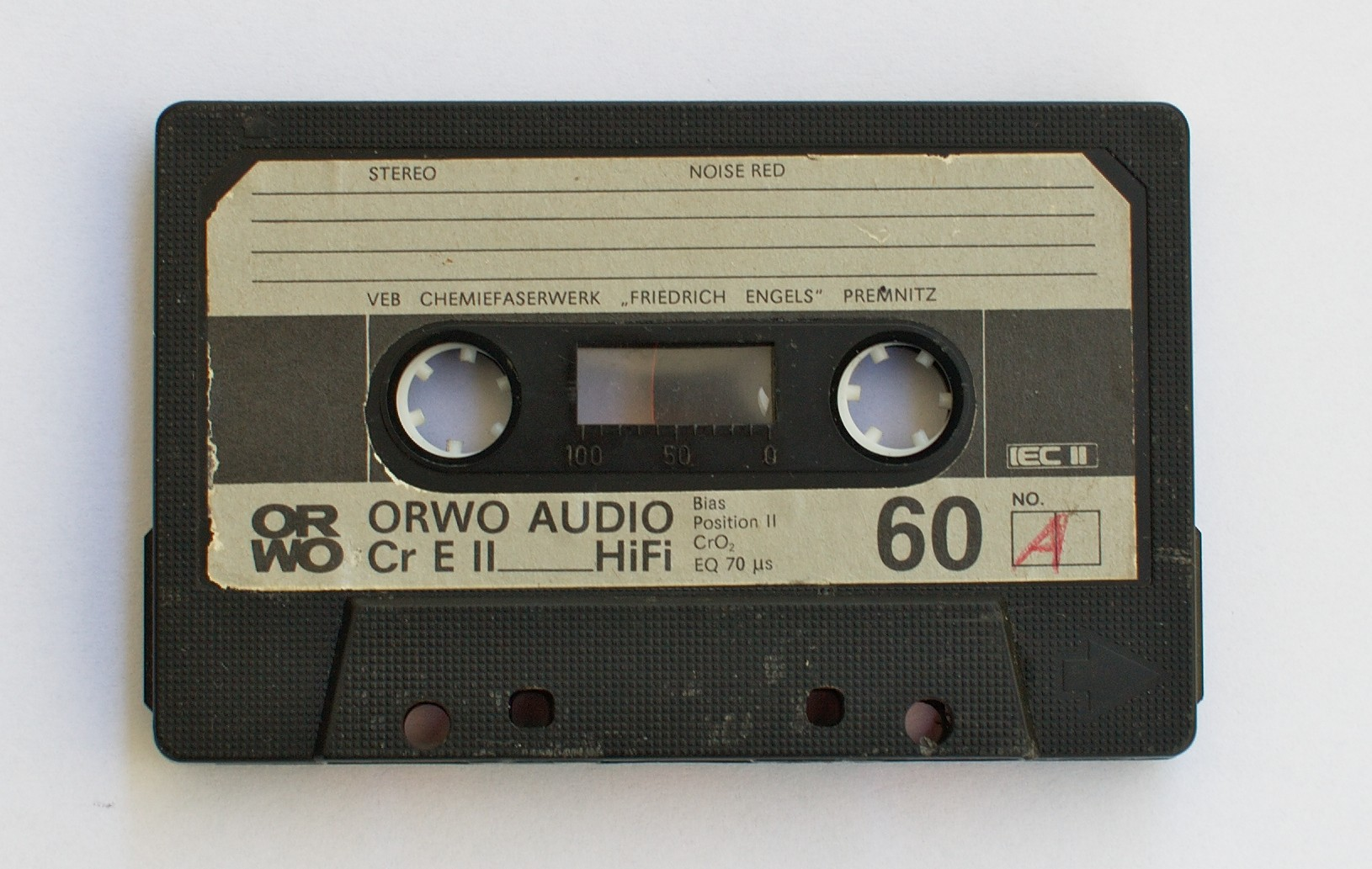
ORWO Chrome Audio cassette tape (before 1990)

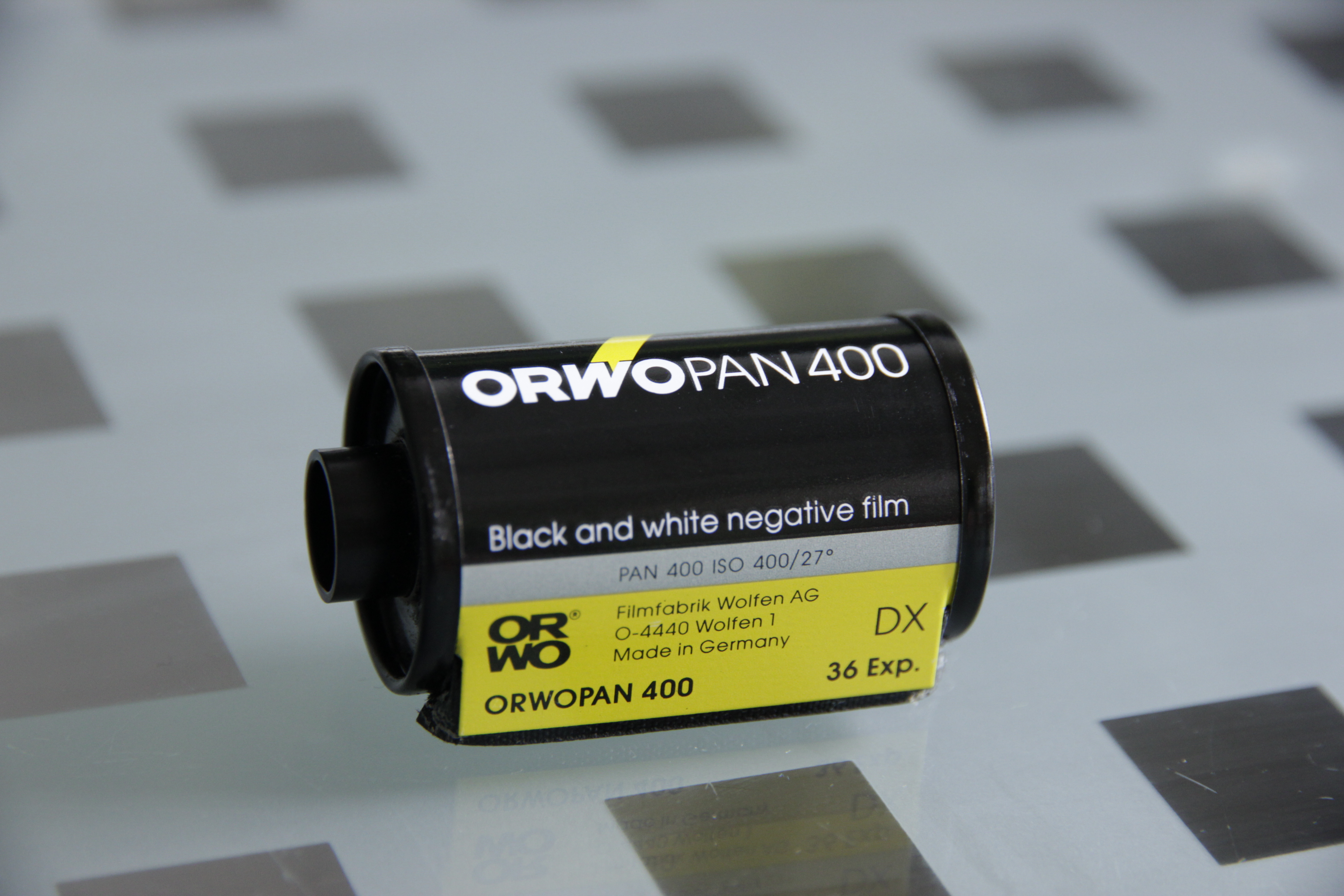
ORWO PAN 400 cartridge (before 1994)

== Wolfen Industrial and Film Museum ==
The Industrie- und Filmmuseum Wolfen provides a permanent exhibition about the history of the Filmfabrik Wolfen and the ORWO products.

== See also ==
- Photographic film
- List of motion picture film stocks
- List of discontinued photographic films
- List of photographic films
