= Daniel Roi =

German politician (born 1987)

Member of the Landtag of Saxony-Anhalt
- Incumbent
- Assumed office 12 April 2016

Personal details
- Born: 23 December 1987 (age 38) Wolfen
- Party: Alternative for Germany (since 2013)

Daniel Roi (born 23 December 1987 in Wolfen) is a German politician serving as a member of the Landtag of Saxony-Anhalt since 2016. He has served as chairman of the Alternative for Germany in Anhalt-Bitterfeld since 2013.
