= Covestro =

German chemical company

Covestro AG
- Type: Aktiengesellschaft
- Traded as: FWB: 1COV
- Industry: Chemicals; Materials
- Predecessor: Bayer MaterialScience
- Founded: 1 September 2015; 10 years ago
- Headquarters: Leverkusen, North Rhine-Westphalia, Germany
- Key people: Markus Steilemann (CEO)
- Revenue: ▲€18.0 billion (2022)
- Operating income: ▼€0.3 billion (2022)
- Net income: ▼€−0.3 billion (2022)
- Total assets: ▼€14.6 billion (2022)
- Total equity: ▼€7.1 billion (2022)
- Owner: XRG
- Number of employees: 17,985 (2022)
- Parent: ADNOC
- Website: www.covestro.com

Covestro AG is a German company producing polyurethane and polycarbonate raw materials. Products include isocyanates and polyols for cellular foams, thermoplastic polyurethane and polycarbonate pellets, as well as polyurethane based additives used in the formulation of coatings and adhesives. It is a Bayer spin-off formed in the fall of 2015 and was formerly called Bayer MaterialScience.

The main industries served are automotive manufacturing and supply, electrical engineering and electronics, construction and home products, and sports and leisure. Their products include coatings and adhesives, polyurethanes that are used in thermal insulation, electrical housings, and as a component of footwear and mattresses, and polycarbonates such as Covestro's Makrolon, which are highly impact-resistant plastics. Covestro polyurethane was used in the 2014 official FIFA World Cup football. Before 2019, Covestro enjoyed rapid earnings growth following supply shortages of chemicals used in foams.

Covestro shares were first offered on the Frankfurt Stock Exchange in October 2015. Bayer sold its entire remaining stake in May 2018, Bayer's pension fund had a 6.8% stake managed separately. In November 2019, H.I.G. Capital acquired Covestro's European systems houses business.

In October 2024, Abu Dhabi National Oil Company (ADNOC) announced a deal to buy Covestro for €14.7 billion. In December 2025, it was announced that the transaction had been completed through XRG, a subsidiary of the Abu Dhabi state-owned company formerly known as ADNOC International.

== Acquisition by ADNOC ==
In September 2023, Covestro reported that it was in talks with ADNOC for the latter to acquire it.

Since the German firm announced it would support its takeover bid of €62 per share in October 2024, this meant that the Abu Dhabi-based company would buy Covestro for up to €16 billion. Furthermore, it was stated that the acquisition was expected to be completed in the second half of 2025.

In November 2025, the EU competition regulator conditionally approved the acquisition after ADNOC offered to ensure the firm aligned with UAE insolvency law and to share Covestro's sustainability patents with some competitors. A month later, the purchase was completed by ADNOC through XRG.

== See also ==
- Linde Group
- BASF
- Lanxess
- Viverso
