= Denny Jankowski =

German politician (born 1983)

- Jankowski in 2026

Member of the Landtag of Thuringia
- Incumbent
- Assumed office 26 November 2019

Personal details
- Born: 27 April 1983 (age 43) Wolfen, East Germany
- Party: Alternative for Germany (since 2013)

Denny Jankowski (born 27 April 1983 in Wolfen) is a German politician serving as a member of the Landtag of Thuringia since 2019. He has been a member of the Alternative for Germany since 2013.
