= Allnex =

German industrial company

Allnex GmbH
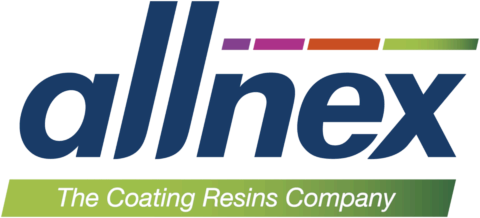
- Trade name: allnex
- Type: GmbH
- Industry: Chemical
- Founded: 2013; 13 years ago
- Headquarters: Frankfurt am Main, Germany
- Area served: Worldwide
- Key people: Miguel Mantas (CEO), Duncan Taylor (CFO)
- Products: Coating resins, additives and crosslinkers
- Revenue: €2.1 billion
- Owner: PTT Global Chemical
- Number of employees: 4,000
- Parent: Allnex Holdings S.à r.l.
- Website: allnex.com

Allnex (branded as allnex) is a German multinational company that produces industrial coating resins and additives for architectural, industrial, protective, automotive and special purpose coatings and inks.

Allnex was established in 2013 after Advent International acquired the Coating Resins Division as a divestiture from Cytec Industries. In September 2016, Allnex and Nuplex Industries, a manufacturer of resins, were merged to form one company, which has its headquarters in Frankfurt am Main, Germany.

Allnex has 33 manufacturing facilities, 23 research and technology support centers and 5 joint ventures spread across five continents: Asia, Europe, North and South America, and Oceania. The company has around 4,000 employees and is present in around 100 countries. The operating Allnex group is owned by Allnex Holdings S.à r.l., a company based in Luxembourg.

== History ==
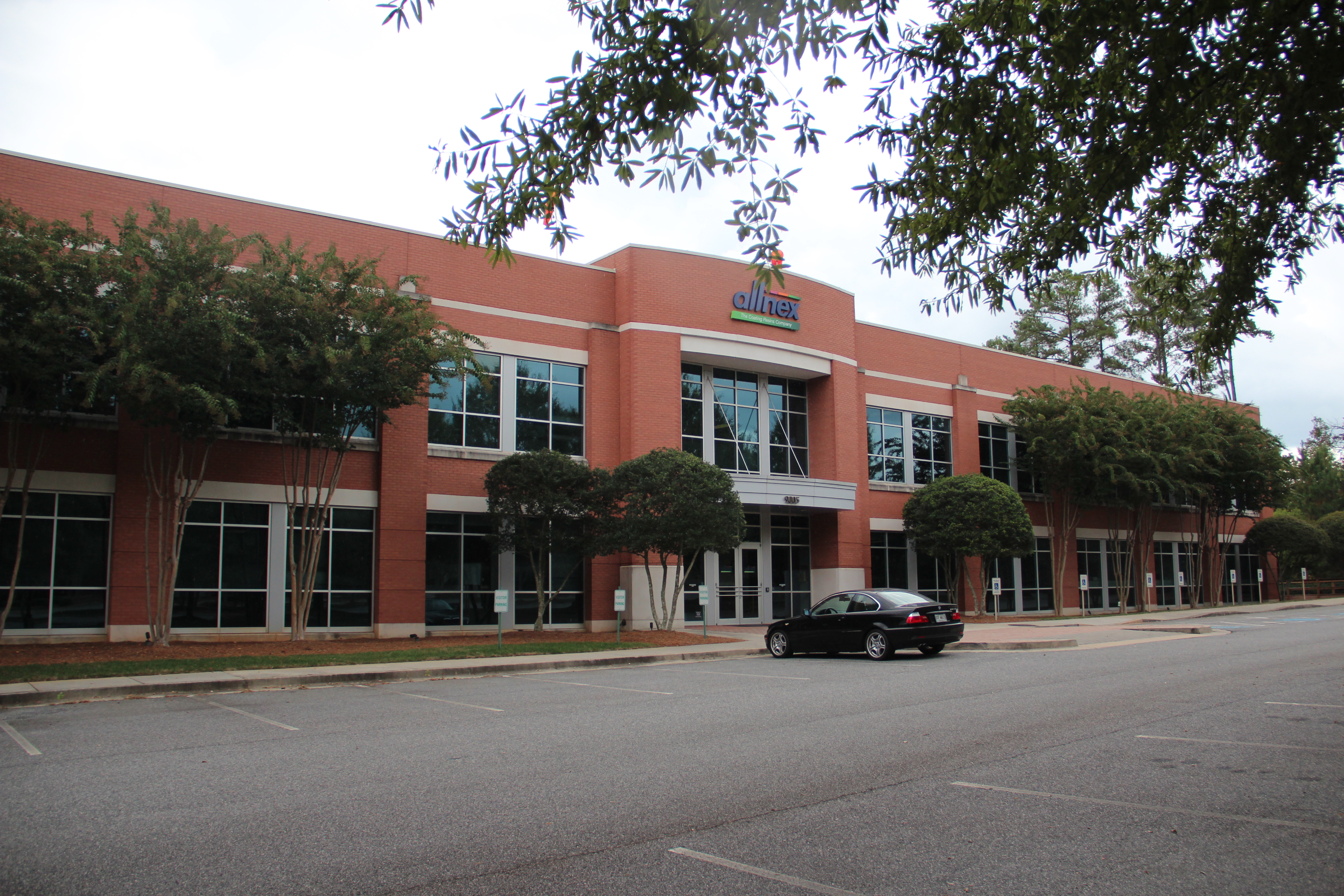
Allnex Americas headquarters in Alpharetta, Georgia

April 2013: Advent International acquired the Coating Resins division as a divestiture from Cytec Industries.

October 2013: Allnex acquired Desmolux® non-waterborne radiation curing resins from Bayer MaterialScience.

February 2014: Allnex opened a technology center and Americas headquarters in Alpharetta, Georgia, USA.

December 2014: Allnex acquired Águia Química, one of the largest manufacturers of alkyd and acrylic resins in Brazil, founded in 1989, and is located in Ponta Grossa, Brazil.

September 2016: Allnex merged with Nuplex Industries, now operating under the name allnex with its headquarters in Frankfurt am Main.

July 2021: Allnex was acquired by PTT Global Chemical, a multinational chemical company based in Thailand.

August 2022: Allnex launch their range of premium sustainability products under the brand ECOWISE™ CHOICE.
