= Nuplex Industries =

Defunct resin manufacturer

Nuplex Industries Ltd
- Type: Subsidiary
- Industry: Manufacturing, chemicals
- Founded: 1952
- Defunct: 14 June 2016
- Fate: Merger with Allnex
- Headquarters: Sydney, Australia
- Areas served: Global
- Key people: CEO - Emery Severin, Chairman - Peter Springford
- Number of employees: 1700+
- Website: www.nuplex.com

Nuplex Industries Limited was a global manufacturer and distributor of resins used in decorative paints and industrial and performance coatings with operations in Europe, Asia, the Americas, Australia and New Zealand. They were a publicly listed company on the NZX50 index in New Zealand.

== History ==
The business was founded in 1952, and was initially a distribution company for flooring products. As of 2015, they employed over 1700 staff across 25 countries. They have a number of manufacturing divisions, including:

- Automotive related resins and plastics
- Vehicle paints
- aerospace resins and paints
- marine products,
- flooring & construction for the commercial and industrial sectors
- adhesives
- paper and textiles

Nuplex Industries was headquartered in Sydney, Australia with the Allnex merger its headquarters moved to Frankfurt am Main. As at 31 December 2015, Nuplex Industries had a NZ$895 million market capitalisation. Its chairman of the board of directors is Peter Springford, and its chief executive officer has been Emery Severin since 2010.

== Expansion ==
Since the 2008 financial crisis, Nuplex has expanded profitably into Europe and Asia with their industrial coatings and paints. They have been described by Research and markets, an independent financial analyst firm as one of the major global players in global resins coating. They opened a new factory in Russia in 2014 to cater to expected long-term growth from that country. Nuplex signalled at its AGM in November 2015 that it expected strong sales for a new fast drying paint that had been in research and development for the previous seven years.

In mid-September 2016 Nuplex was brought together with Allnex, from then on operating under the name Allnex. After the Allnex takeover, Nuplex was delisted from the NZX. New corporate headquarters of the combined company are in Frankfurt am Main in Germany.
