= Credé's method =

Credé's method and Credé's procedure most commonly refers to one of two medical procedures:

- Credé's prophylaxis for preventing blindness in newborns.
- Credé's maneuver for expelling the placenta or voiding the bladder.
