= Christian Gerhard Leopold =

German gynecologist (1846–1911)

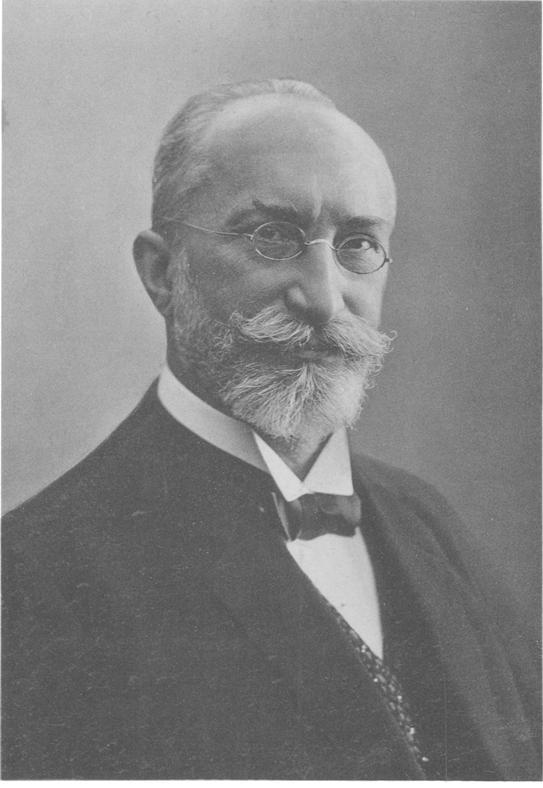
- Christian Gerhard Leopold
- Born: 24 February 1846
- Died: 12 September 1911 (aged 65)
- Occupation: gynecologist
- Known for: Leopold maneuvers

Christian Gerhard Leopold (24 February 1846 – 12 September 1911) was a German gynecologist born in Meerane, Saxony.

In 1870 he earned his medical doctorate from the University of Leipzig, where he studied under Carl Siegmund Franz Credé (1819-1892), who would later become his father-in-law. From 1877 until 1883 he taught midwifery at the Frauenklinik in Leipzig, and afterwards succeeded Franz von Winckel (1837-1911) as director of the Dresden Royal Gynecological Infirmary.

Leopold is remembered for the eponymous "Leopold maneuvers" (Leopold-Handgriffe), which are four classic maneuvers used to determine the position of the fetus within the uterus. Beginning in 1894 he was co-editor of the Archiv für Gynäkologie with Adolf Gusserow (1836-1906). Also, with Dr. Credé and Paul Zweifel (1848-1927), he published textbooks on midwifery.

N.B. - Leopold Landau, who was also a German gynecologist born around this time, may be confused with Christian Gerhard Leopold.
