= Johann Friedrich Ahlfeld =

Johann Friedrich Ahlfeld may refer to:

- Johann Friedrich Ahlfeld (obstetrician)
- Johann Friedrich Ahlfeld (theologian)
