= Heider =

Heider may refer to:

- Heider (surname)
- Heider FC, German football club
- Heider SV, German football club
- Heider Sati

== See also ==
- Heider Umland, Ämter in Schleswig-Holstein, Germany
- Heider Sati
