= Kaiser Wilhelm Memorial Cemetery =

Coordinates: 52°31′33″N 13°16′40″E

Kaiser-Wilhelm-Gedächtnis-Friedhof
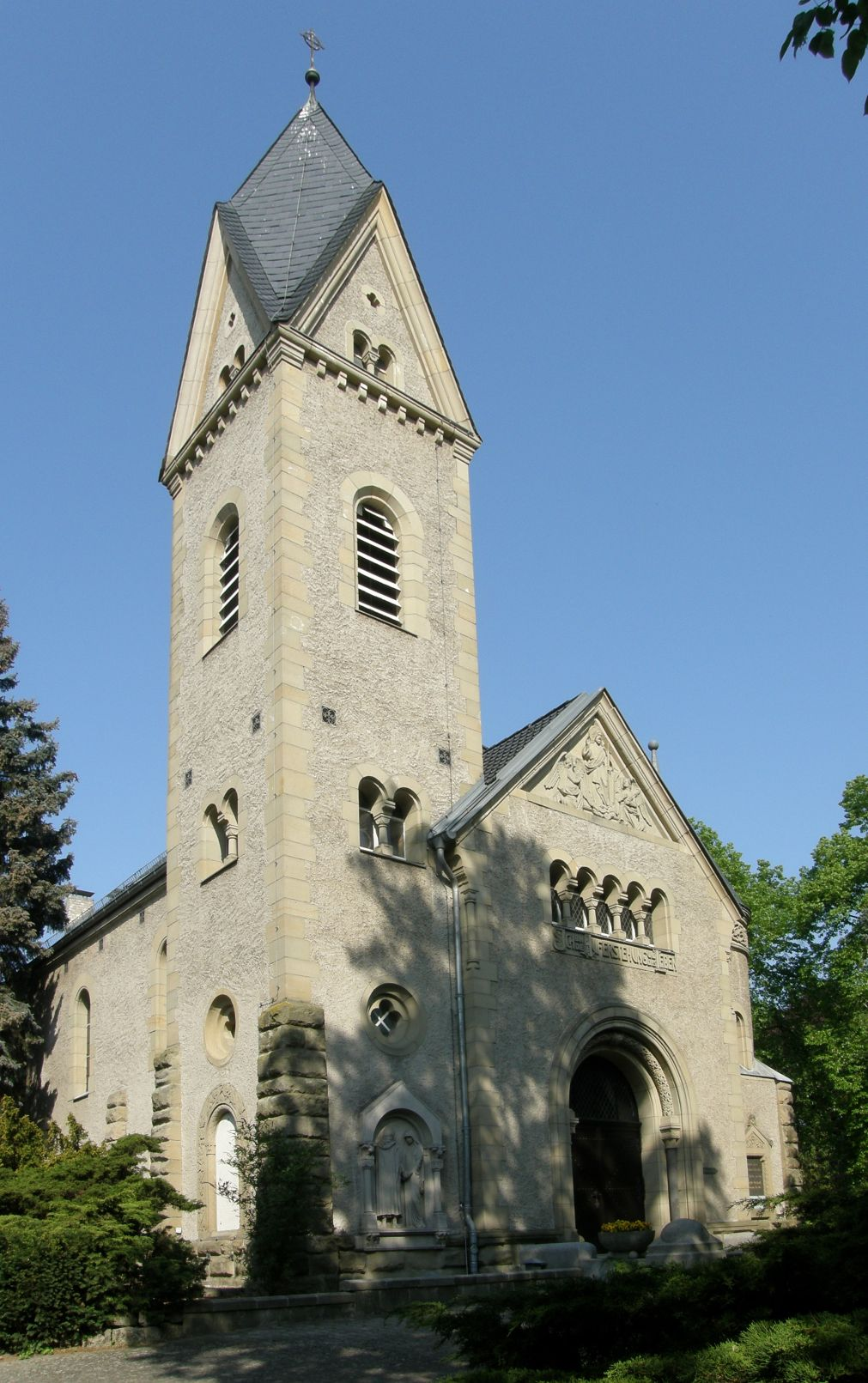
- Cemetery chapel

Details
- Established: 1896
- Location: Berlin
- Country: Germany
- Type: Protestant cemetery

The Protestant Kaiser Wilhelm Memorial Cemetery (German: Der evangelische Kaiser-Wilhelm-Gedächtnis-Friedhof) is a burial ground in the Westend district of Berlin with a size of 3.7 hectares. The cemetery is under monument and cultural heritage protection.

The cemetery is located on Fürstenbrunner way, adjacent to the cemetery Luisenfriedhof III and is connected by two paths.

== History ==
The Protestant Kaiser Wilhelm Memorial Church was established in 1896 due to the growing Lutheran population in West Berlin. Luisen parish gave the congregation of the Kaiser Wilhelm Memorial Church a 4.7-hectare (12-acre) site for the founding of its own cemetery.

The inauguration of the cemetery with the first burial took place on 25 July 1896.

In 1903 a cemetery chapel was built. Until then they used the facilities at the adjacent cemetery, Luisenfriedhof III. The chapel was designed in Romanesque style and the dedication of the chapel took place on 27 September 1903.

Unique among the chapels in Berlin cemeteries, was a burial vault system. In World War II the chapel was badly damaged. The chapel was rebuilt in 1952/1953 and 1978 with extensive renovations.

== Notable burials ==
Notables buried include:

- Franz Betz (1835–1900), Bass-baritone opera singer, who sang at the Berlin State Opera from 1859 to 1897
- Max Chop (1862-1929) Composer, musicologist and author
- Alfred Dührssen (1862–1933), Gynecologist and obstetrician
- Woldemar Friedrich (1846–1910), Historical painter and illustrator
- Richard von Kaufmann (1849–1908), Minister of finance and art collector
- Otto von Gierke (1841–1921), Historian
- Alfred Goldscheider (1858–1935), Neurologist
- Otto Hirschfeld (1843–1922), Epigraphist and professor of ancient history
- Joseph Joachim (1831–1907), Hungarian violinist, conductor, composer and teacher
- Fedor Krause (1857–1937), Neurosurgeon
- Oskar Liebreich (1839–1908), Pharmacologist
- John Henry Mackay (1864–1933)
- Alexander Merensky (1837–1918), Protestant missionary
- Henny Porten (1890–1960), Actress and film producer of the silent era
- John Rabe (1882–1950), Businessmen, helped to establish the Nanking Safety Zone
- Heinrich Reimann (1850–1906), Musicologist, organist, and composer
- Friedrich Spielhagen (1829–1911), Novelist
- Gerda von Zobeltitz (1891–1963) one of the first recognized transgender people in the late German Empire and early Weimar Republic

== Gallery ==
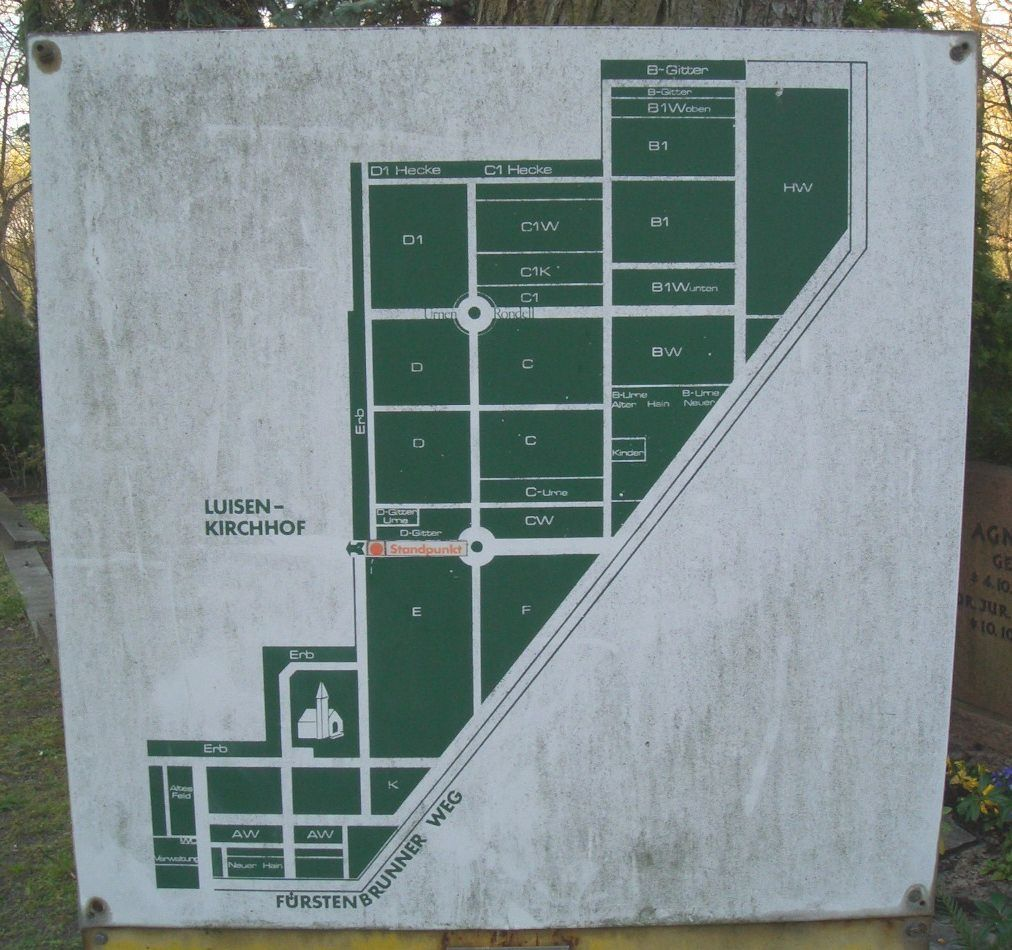

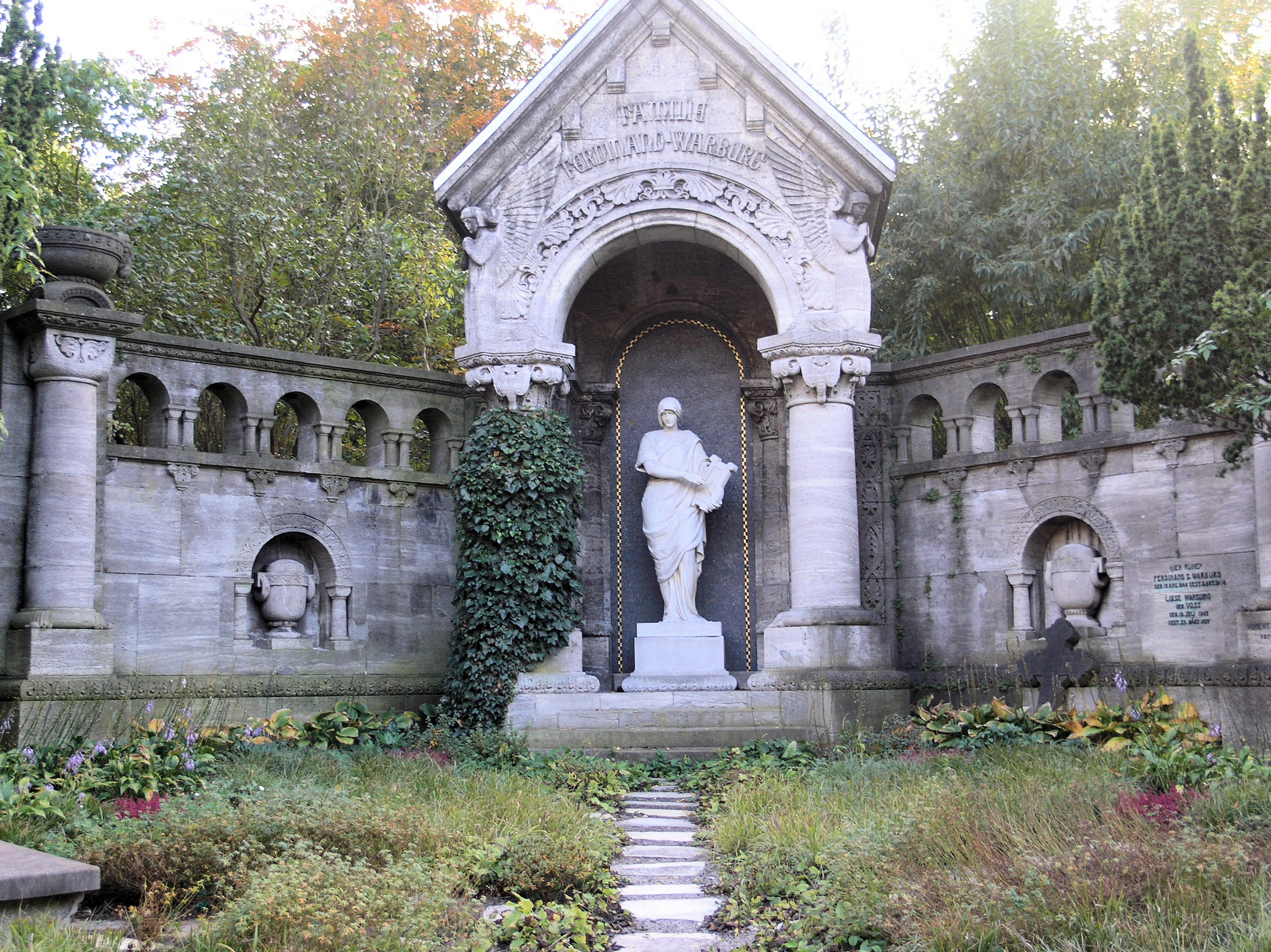

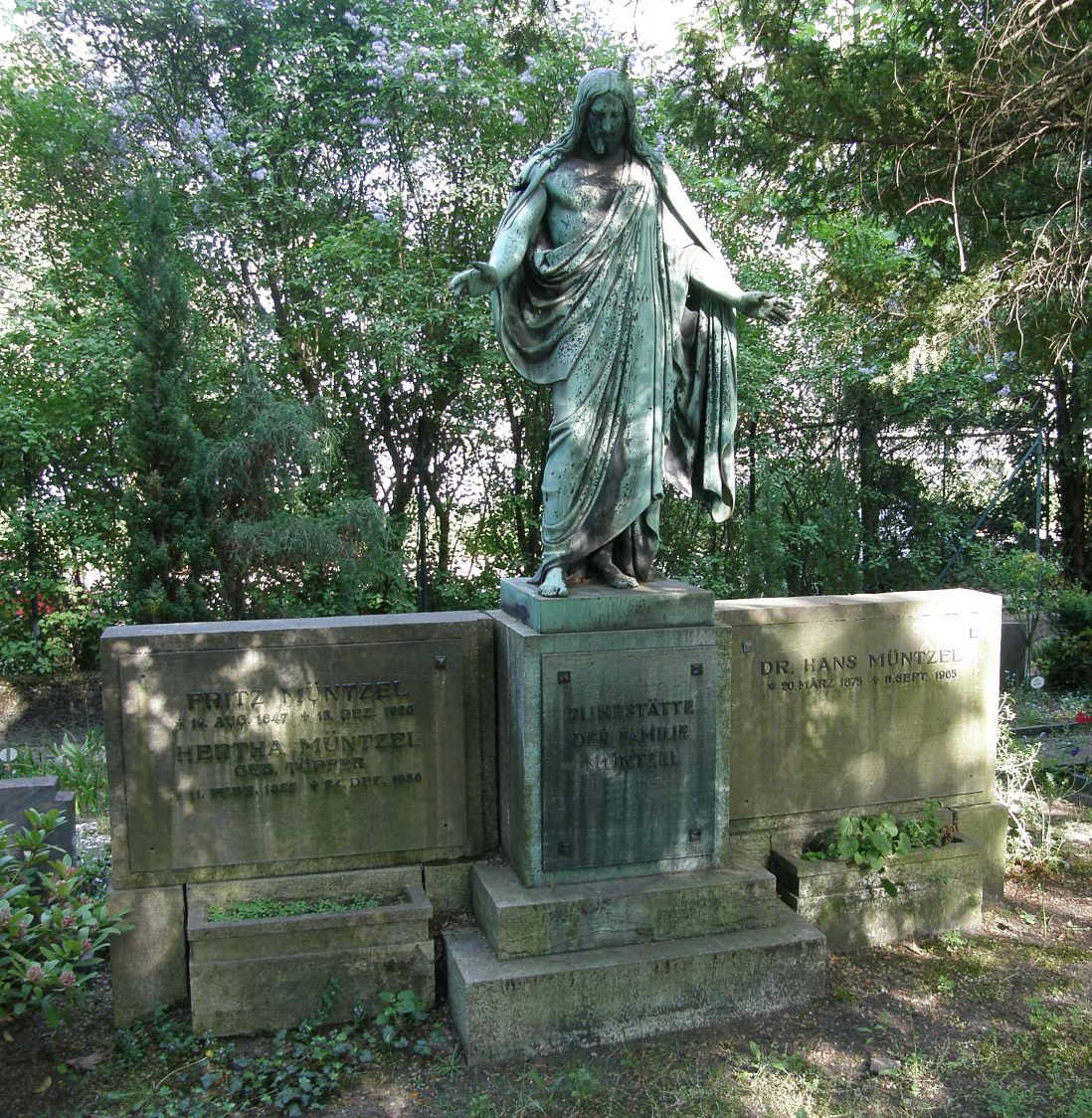

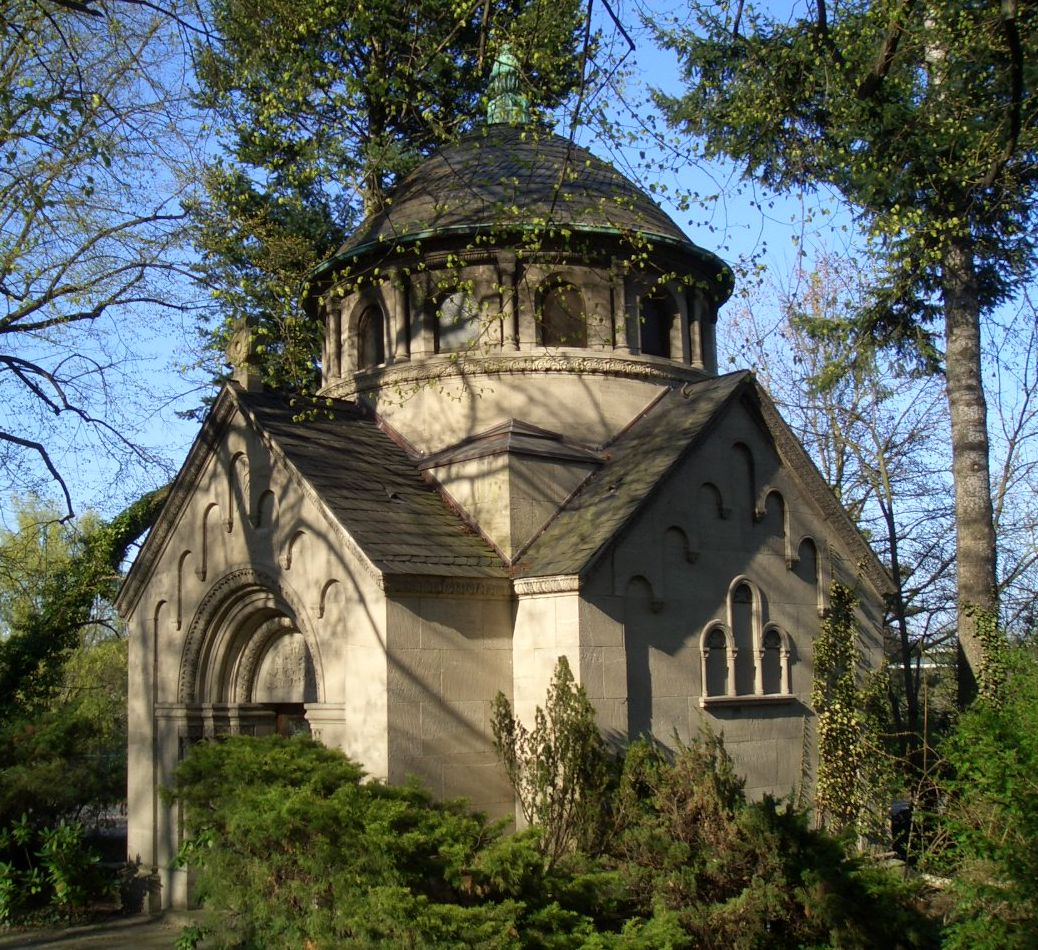

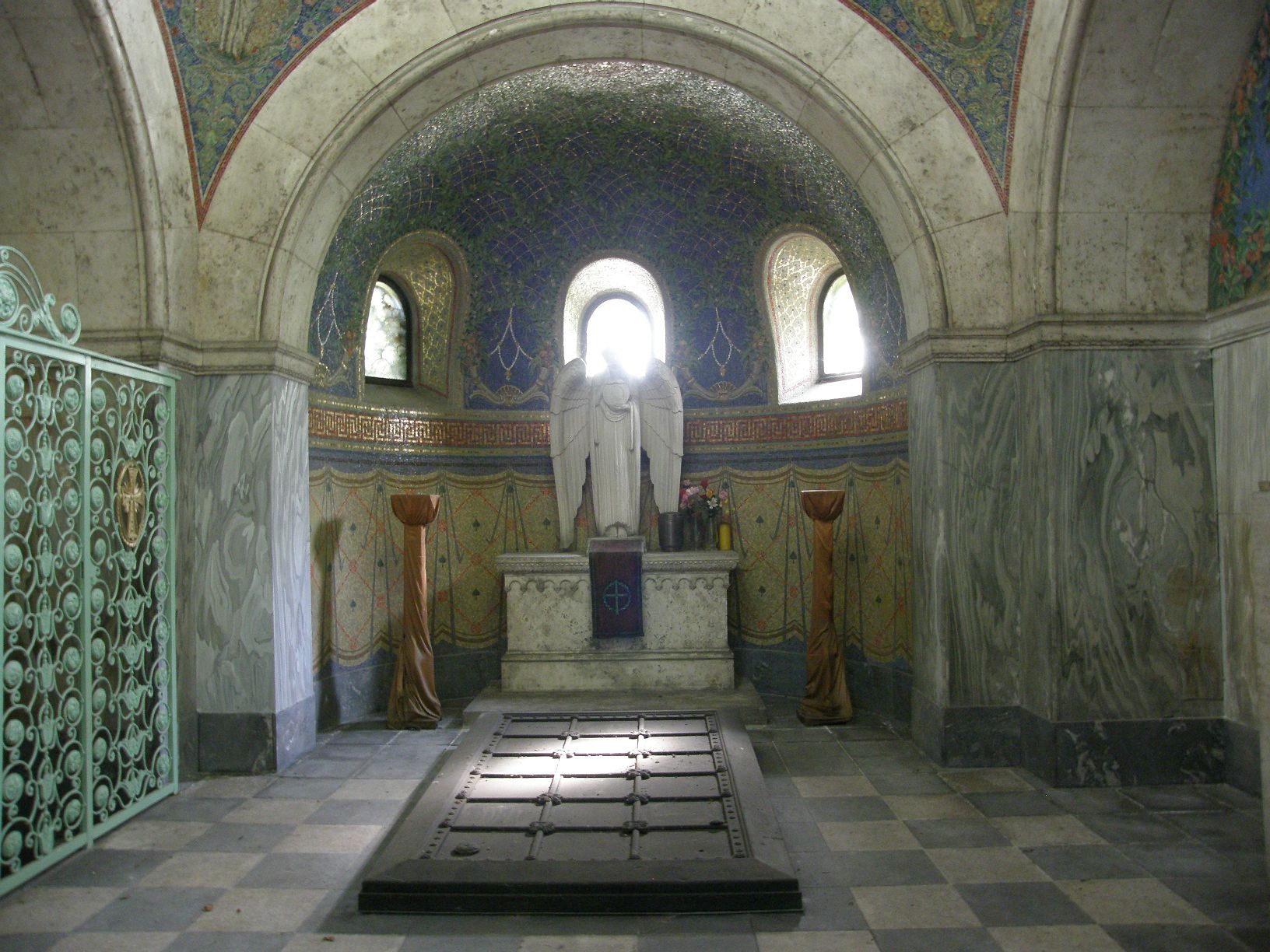
