= Wolfgang Herrmann =

Wolfgang Herrmann may refer to:

- Wolfgang Herrmann (librarian) (1904–1945), German librarian and member of the Nazi Party
- Wolfgang A. Herrmann (born 1948), German chemist and former president of the Technical University of Munich
