= Benno Credé =

German surgeon (1847–1929)

Carl Benno Credé (1 September 1847 in Berlin – 14 March 1929 in Dresden) was a German surgeon. He was the son of gynecologist Carl Siegmund Franz Credé (1819–1892).

He studied medicine at the universities of Zürich and Leipzig, receiving his doctorate in 1870. After participation in the Franco-Prussian War and an extended study tour, he served as an assistant in the surgical clinic at the University of Leipzig. In 1877 he opened a private surgical clinic in Dresden. In 1892 he became a senior physician at the Carolahaus in Dresden, where five years later he was named chief physician. From 1901 onward, he was chief senior physician of the surgical department at the new municipal hospital in Dresden-Johannstadt.

In the 1890s he introduced colloidal silver (collargol) as a treatment for infectious conditions. "Unguentum Credé" was a salve that contained 15% of soluble metallic silver.

== Published works ==
- Einiges über das Wunderysipel im St. Jakobshospitale zu Leipzig; dissertation, (1870).
- Silber und Silbersalze als Antiseptika, with J. L. Beyer (1896).
- Geschichte und Stammtafel der Familie Credé seit ihrer Einwanderung in das Deutsche Reich nach Aufhebung des Edictes von Nantes am 22. Oct. 1685, (1909).
