= Johann Friedrich Ahlfeld (obstetrician) =

German gynecologist and obstetrician

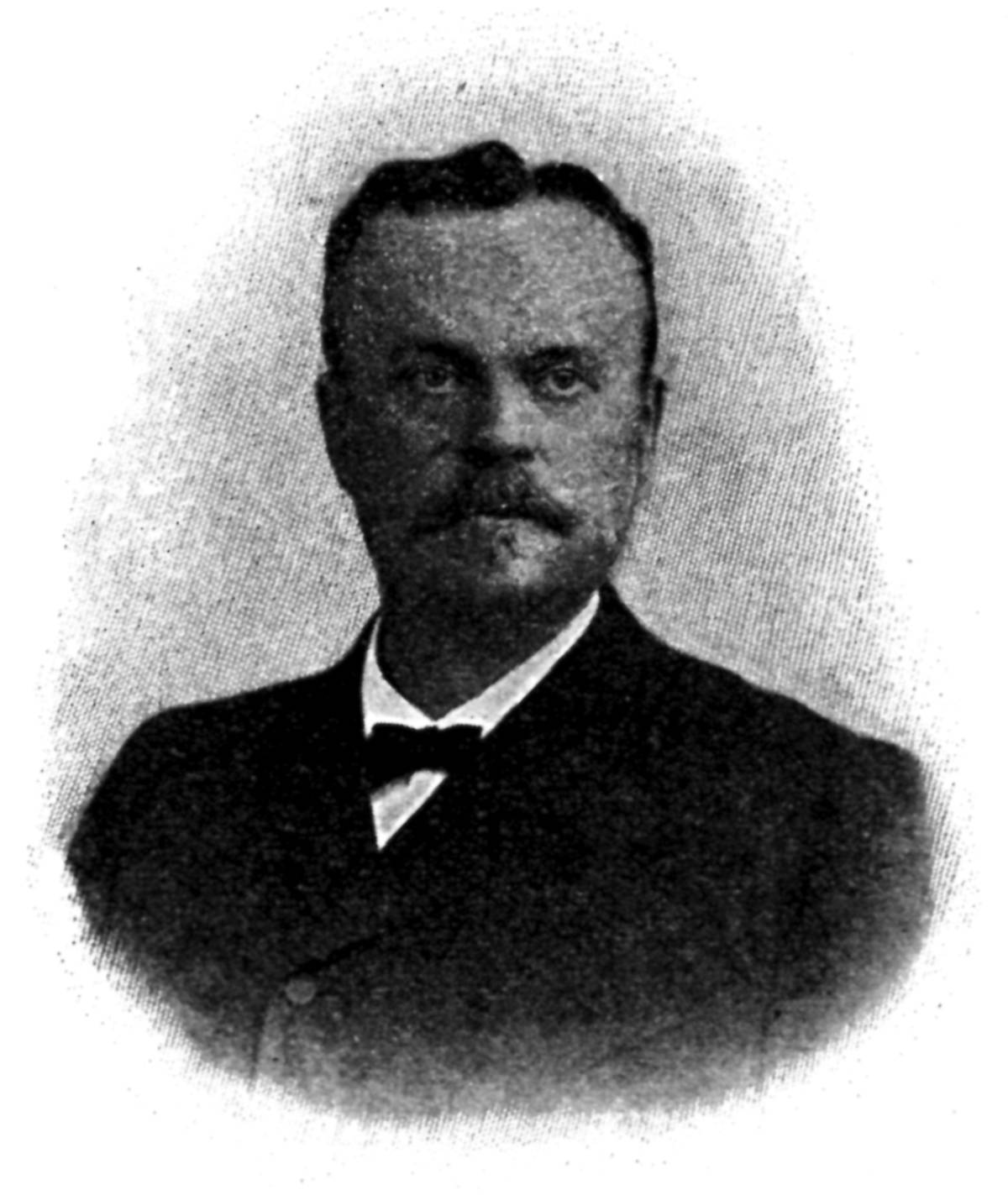
- Born: 16 October 1843; Alsleben/Saale
- Died: 29 May 1929 (aged 85); Marburg, Hesse, Germany
- Education: University of Greifswald, University of Leipzig
- Medical career
- Profession: Gynecologist, Obstetrician

Johann Friedrich Ahlfeld (16 October 1843 in Alsleben – 25 May 1929 in Marburg) was a German obstetrician and gynecologist.

From 1863 to 1867 he studied medicine at the universities of Greifswald and Leipzig, where he was a pupil of Carl Siegmund Franz Credé. In 1868 he received his doctorate with the dissertation-thesis Über Zerreissung der Schamfuge während der Geburt. In 1873 he obtained his habilitation for obstetrics and gynecology at the University of Leipzig, and in 1877 attained the title of associate professor. In 1881 he became a full professor at the University of Giessen, then two years later relocated to Marburg as director of the university Frauenklinik and school for midwives.

== Associated terms ==
- "Ahlfeld's method": A term formerly used for disinfection of the hands using hot water and alcohol.
- "Alfeld's sign": Irregular uterine contraction after the third month of pregnancy.

== Selected works ==
- Die Technik der Schwangerenuntersuchung, 1873 – The technique of pregnancy investigation.
- Lehrbuch der Geburtshilfe zur wissenschaftlichen und praktischen Ausbildung, (1874, 2nd edition 1898) – Textbook of obstetrics for scientific and practical training.
- Die Missbildungen des Menschen; eine systematische Darstellung der beim Menschen angeboren vorkommenden Missbildungen und Erklärung ihrer Entstehungsweise (2 parts, 1880–82) – Malformations of humans; a systematic presentation of congenital malformations occurring in humans and explanations of their mode of origin.
- Abwartende Methode oder Credéscher Handgriff, 1888 – Wait-and-see approach or Crede's maneuver.
- Die Desinfection der Hand des Geburtshelfers und Chirurgen, 1901 – Disinfection of the hands for the obstetrician and surgeon.
