= Julian Grundt =

German footballer

Personal information
- Date of birth: 21 June 1988 (age 38)
- Place of birth: Heide, West Germany
- Height: 1.84 m (6 ft 0 in)
- Position: Midfielder

Youth career
- 1993–2004: Heider SV
- 2004–2007: Werder Bremen

Senior career*
Years	Team	Apps	(Gls)
2007–2010	Werder Bremen II	21	(2)
- * Club domestic league appearances and goals

Julian Grundt (born 21 June 1988) is a German former footballer who played as a midfielder for Werder Bremen II.
