= Woldemar Friedrich =

German painter and illustrator (1846–1910)

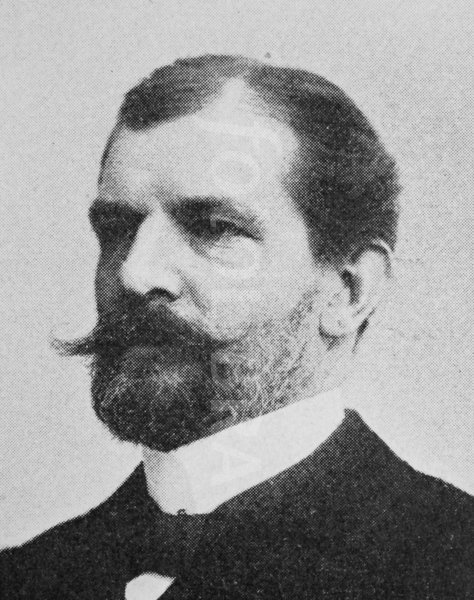
Woldemar Friedrich (1890s)

Woldemar Friedrich (20 August 1846 – 16 September 1910) was a German historical painter and illustrator.

== Biography ==
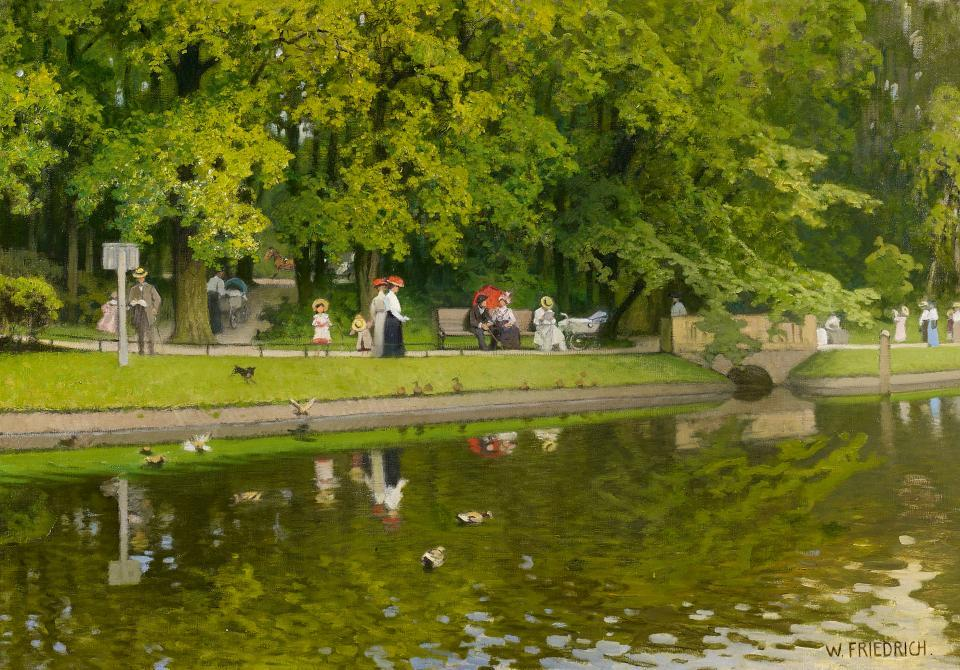
Summer in the Tiergarten

He was born in Gnadau, Saxony. In 1863, he began his studies at the Prussian Academy of Arts in Berlin, with Carl Steffeck. Two years later, he went to Weimar, where he continued his studies with Arthur von Ramberg, Charles Verlat and Bernhard Plockhorst. During the Franco-Prussian War, he created illustrations for the weekly family magazine, Daheim then, after the war, illustrated Der französische Krieg von 1870/71, by Georg Hiltl. After a study trip to Italy, he returned to Weimar in 1873, where he divided his time between illustrating and decorative painting; notably at the New Castle, Hummelshain. In 1881, he accepted an appointment as Professor at the Grand-Ducal Saxon Art School.

In 1885, he went to Berlin, to teach "drawing from life" at the Academy of Arts. There he continued to do decorative work, in the dome at the State Exhibition Building. In 1886, he was awarded a small gold medal at the Große Berliner Kunstausstellung. This was followed by a trip to India, after which he produced a series of watercolors and paintings, as well as an illustrated book, Sechs Monate in Indien, with text by "E. von Leipziger".

Later decorative paintings of note include "The Diet of Worms", in the auditorium of the grammar school in Wittenberg, the allegorical paintings at the Deutsches Buchhändlerhaus in Leipzig, and a mural for the community center in Niederbarnim, which depicts the citizens of Bernau returning home, after defeating the Hussites in 1432.

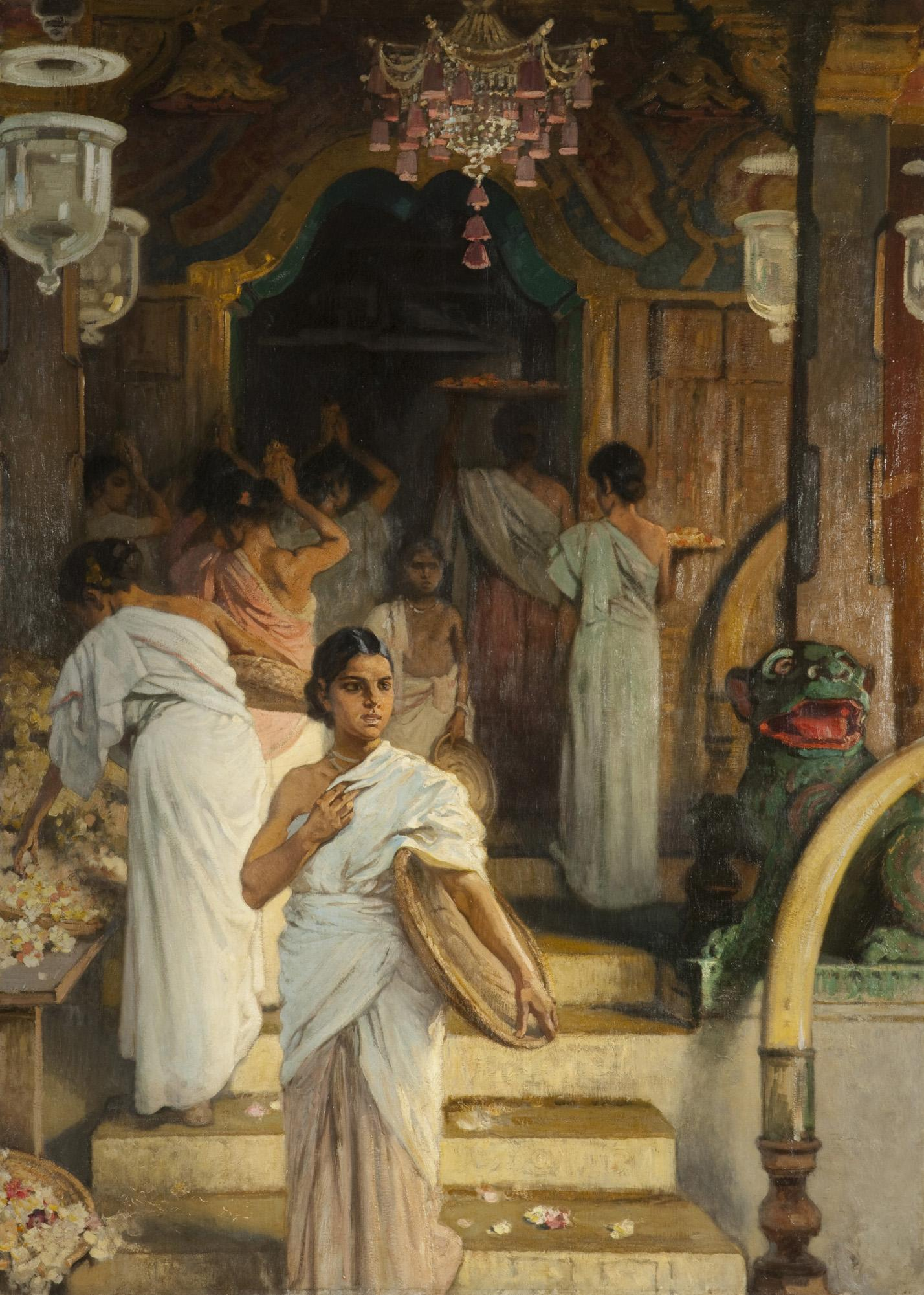
At an Indian Temple, 1890

From 1898, he was a member of the jury delegated to choose designs for the trading cards issued by the Stollwerck chocolate company. His fellow judges included Franz Skarbina, Emil Doepler and Bruno Schmitz, who was a partner in the company.

He died in Berlin at the age of sixty-four and was interred at the Kaiser-Wilhelm-Gedächtnis-Friedhof in Charlottenburg-Westend. His grave has not been preserved.
