= Gerda von Zobeltitz =

German dressmaker

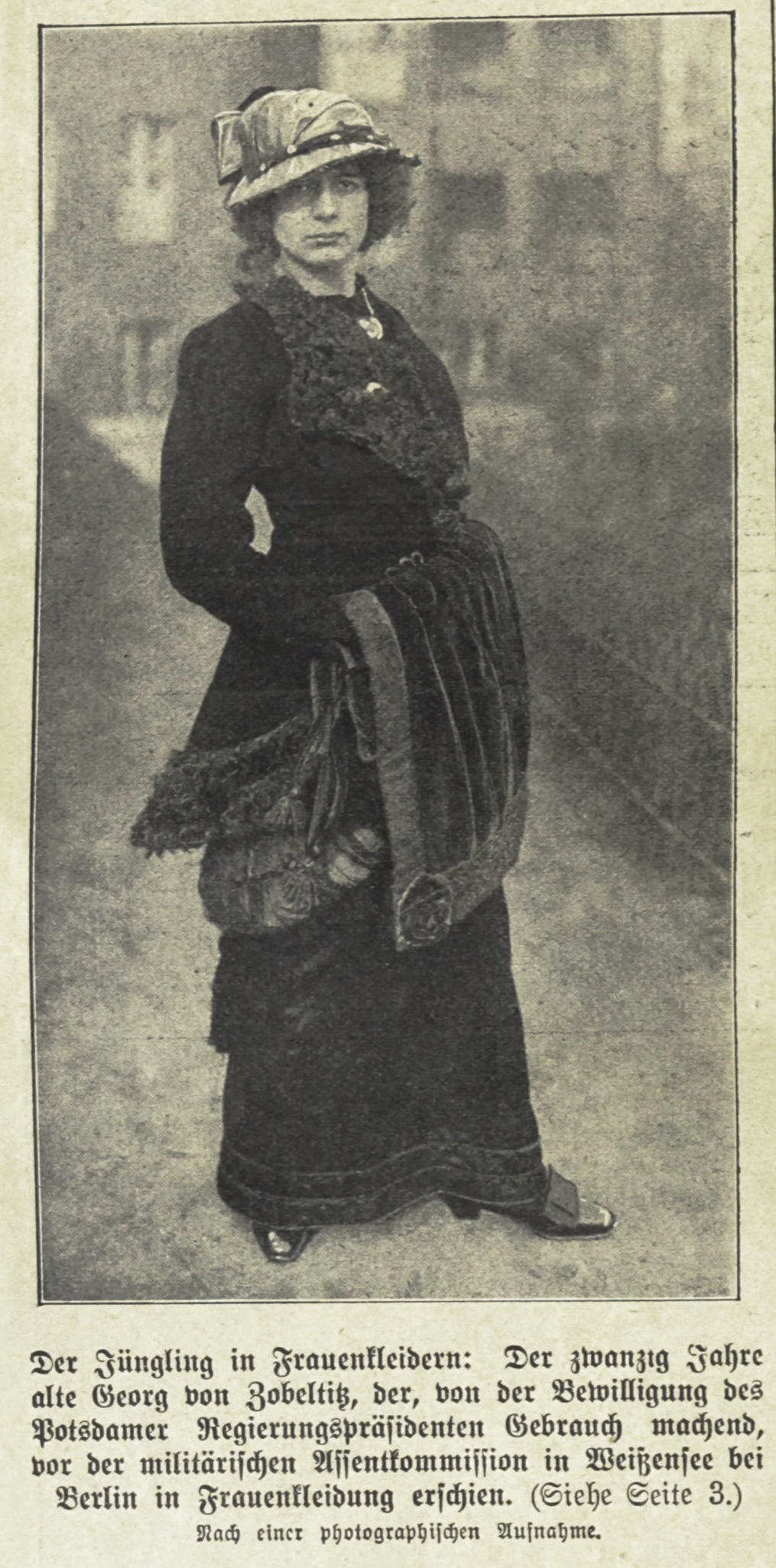
- Von Zobeltitz in 1913
- Born: June 9, 1891; Rixdorf, German Empire
- Died: March 29, 1963 (aged 71); Berlin, West Germany
- Resting place: Kaiser Wilhelm Memorial Cemetery
- Occupation: dressmaker
- Spouse: Charlotte Paulig (1916-1917; divorced)

Gerda von Zobeltitz (9 June 1891 – 29 March 1963) was a German dressmaker, noblewoman, and one of the first recognized transgender people in the late German Empire and early Weimar Republic.

== Life ==
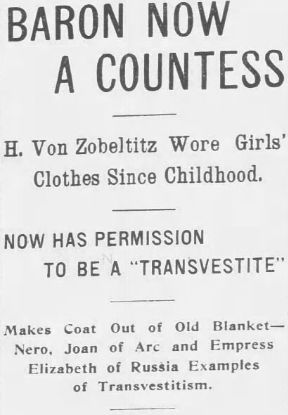
An article about Zobeltitz in the Chattanooga Daily Times, August 12, 1912.

Zobeltitz came from the noble family of the same name, albeit from a line that had "gone down somewhat in social terms in recent generations". She grew up in Weissensee, Berlin and lived there with her family for most of her life. Her father was a saddler, like her grandfather. Her mother is sometimes listed in address books as a market foreman, and other times as a widow. Zobeltitz had an older brother who died in infancy, and a sister who was two years younger than her who stayed close to the family.

Zobeltitz is first recorded under the name Gerda in 1912. She was arrested for the first time in February 1912, and was taken to the Weissensee police station. She was soon released, and a report was filed by the Berlin police regarding her status. The report corresponded to Hirschfeld's view of transvestite behavior at the time. It attested Gerda's "unsuppressable tendency" from an early age to "live in the manner of the opposite sex, in particular to dress as a girl and to engage in play and work".

Following arrest, Gerda wrote to Magnus Hirschfeld, asking for his assistance. Hirschfeld and his colleague, Ernst Burchard, ran a practice in which they pioneered sexual medicine and from which the Institute for Sexual Science emerged in 1919. They examined Zobeltitz and gave her a report that was supposed to help her get one of the first so-called transvestite passes. This document was intended to protect people whose clothing did not correspond to their official sex from police persecution.

In 1912, von Zobeltitz applied for a transvestite pass with the help of the report from the Berlin police chief, Traugott von Jagow, and received the pass on August 6, 1912 or March 5, 1913. It was the third proven certificate of this kind. At least six Berlin newspapers reported on the pass, some with a photo and other details. The incident also attracted attention in German-speaking countries; a Viennese weekly newspaper reported:

The district president in Potsdam recently gave permission to 20-year-old Georg von Zobeltitz in Weissensee near Berlin to wear women's clothes all the time. The young man had been repeatedly arrested by the police in women's clothing and had to be released again and again because of his feminine disposition. It caused quite a stir when he appeared before the selection committee in women's clothing and could not be persuaded to wear men's clothing in this case. Now that he has gained official permission to wear women's clothing, he will also take up a female profession and learn sewing in order to open a fashion salon.

— Article in Das interessante Blatt, 3 April 1913

Gerda also wore women's clothing for the Imperial Army's examination in 1913. They also certified that she had no tendency towards criminally prosecuted homosexuality.

In June 1914, von Zobeltitz was arrested again at short notice because she was wearing extraordinarily conspicuous clothing and had attracted large crowds on several occasions. She worked as a dressmaker and wore her own designs in extravagant fashion according to the latest fashion. In August 1916 two newspapers again reported on Gerda von Zobeltitz, saying she had married an actress; the two appeared in a photo in their wedding dresses. In fact, on August 29, 1916, von Zobeltitz married 37 year-old privatier Charlotte Valeska Theophila Paulig, who was born in Berlin-Schoeneberg.

In October 1916, her distant relative Hanns von Zobeltitz applied to have Gerda's permission to wear women's clothing revoked. He accused her of being a public nuisance and referred to the public uproar of the marriage and an incident in an unspecified bar near Nollendorfplatz. In particular, the requirements for issuing the ID card with the wedding were no longer applicable. Hanns von Zobeltitz was an off-duty captain who belonged to the influential line of the family, and his writing made an impression. After some internal letters from the authorities, an order was issued in mid-December 1916, according to which the head of office in Weissensee should issue a decree against the transvestite pass. Whether or how this was actually implemented is uncertain; in the 1930s and the 1940s, official confirmations of permission to wear women's clothing are documented.

Von Zobeltitz's divorced Paulig after just a few months, on May 29, 1917, by the Royal District Court III in Berlin. Two other short-term marriages followed, to Helene Elisabeth Emma Abel on February 14, 1919, and to Ida Marie Mörbitz, on December 30, 1919, neither lasting longer than 11 months.

In the 1920s, Gerda von Zobeltitz was a visible part of the Berlin subculture. She appears in December 1920 in an advertisement for the Pan-Diele pub, in which a performance by “Baroness Gerd von Zobeltitz – the Berlin phenomenon” is announced for the tea dance. At a costume ball, "The Festival of Fantasy", in the City Hotel, she performed Das lila Lied, the first German anthem of the homosexual movement.

In some accounts von Zobeltitz was present at a fight in Rauchfangwerder on Lake Zeuthen on July 5, 1930. This marks the first known stand against police violence by homosexuals and other sexual minorities, nearly 40 years before the Stonewall riots in New York City. A local Berlin group, the Bund für Menschenrecht (Federal Human Rights Association), had organized a steamer trip to a popular tourist spot and rented a hall there for several hundred BfM members with an official policy against gender-nonconforming participation. The Berlin police sports group Mitte (led by Erwin Sander) celebrated in the same bar. Tensions rose (according to the police due to presence of Gerda and other trans people), from insults to open violence as the alcohol consumption progressed. Some of the gays and lesbians fought back and ultimately caused the police officers to flee.

During the Nazi Regime, von Zobeltitz continued to work as a seamstress in her apartment in Weissensee and is described as always elegantly dressed in contemporary oral accounts. Contemporary witnesses speak of fears of persecution by the regime, but there is no indication that she ever had difficulties, likely thanks to her nobility status. It is known that she often and loudly listened to the banned BBC broadcasts; she had also called her three St. Bernard dogs "Voralarm“ (pre-alert), "Alarm“, and "Entwarnung“ (all clear), and enjoyed loudly calling them from the balcony. She is described as cursing frequently and harshly, and would not put up with anything when her feminine demeanor was questioned. Some contemporary witnesses hinted at relationships with men, but there is no documentation to support this. In 1944, Gerda remarried and moved from Weissensee to Charlottenburg. Her wife ran a flower shop there.

After World War II, her sister and her daughter moved into her apartment, probably because of the housing shortage resulting from the destruction of the war. Von Zobeltitz continued to make women's clothing, which her sister sold at the market. In the official address book for 1957 she is listed as a dancer, a profession that is otherwise only listed in the marriage certificate of December 30, 1919 as "actor and dancer".

Gerda von Zobeltitz died in a traffic accident on March 29, 1963. She had lost part of her sight and was hit on Kurfürstendamm and fatally injured. She was buried in Kaiser Wilhelm Memorial Cemetery. Her wife lived in the old apartment until January 1985.

== Legacy ==
Gerda von Zobeltitz received attention in 2009 when she became one of the featured people in a presentation of the history of Berlin's lesbians and gays in Prenzlauer Berg, Pankow and Weissensee. The historian Katja Koblitz, from the Spinnboden association, wrote a biographical study of von Zobeltitz based on archive material and eyewitness interviews.

In 2015 the Berlin State Office for Equality – Against Discrimination undertook research to examine whether historic LGBT individuals could be honored via the naming of streets and other locations. The state office concluded that von Zobeltitz had taken on a pioneering role in the fight for recognition and self-determination and that her self-confidence, courage and perseverance should be honored. The reports concludes: "Gerda von Zobeltitz is also an example of the discrimination she has suffered and the non-recognition of her own way of life, also by parts of her family of origin".

Since then, Gerda von Zobeltitz has repeatedly been mentioned in depictions of the role of early trans people in the Weimar Republic, such as in the exhibition "TO BE SEEN. queer lives 1900–1950" at the NS-Document Center Munich 2022/23.

== Sources ==
- Jens Dobler: Von anderen Ufern. Geschichte der Berliner Lesben und Schwulen in Kreuzberg und Friedrichshain. Bruno Gmünder Verlag, Berlin 2003, ISBN 978-3-86187-298-6, p. 75.
- Katja Koblitz: „In ihm hat die Natur das berühmte dritte Geschlecht geschaffen“. Gerda von Zobeltitz, ein Transvestit aus Weißensee. In: Sonntags-Club (Hrsg.): Verzaubert in Nord-Ost. Die Geschichte der Berliner Lesben und Schwulen in Prenzlauer Berg, Pankow und Weißensee. Bruno Gmünder Verlag, Berlin 2009, ISBN 978-3-86787-135-8, pp. 58–80.
- Landesstelle für Gleichstellung – gegen Diskriminierung: Gerda von Zobeltitz. In: Persönlichkeiten in Berlin 1825–2006, pp. 82 ff.
