= Alsleben =

- Town
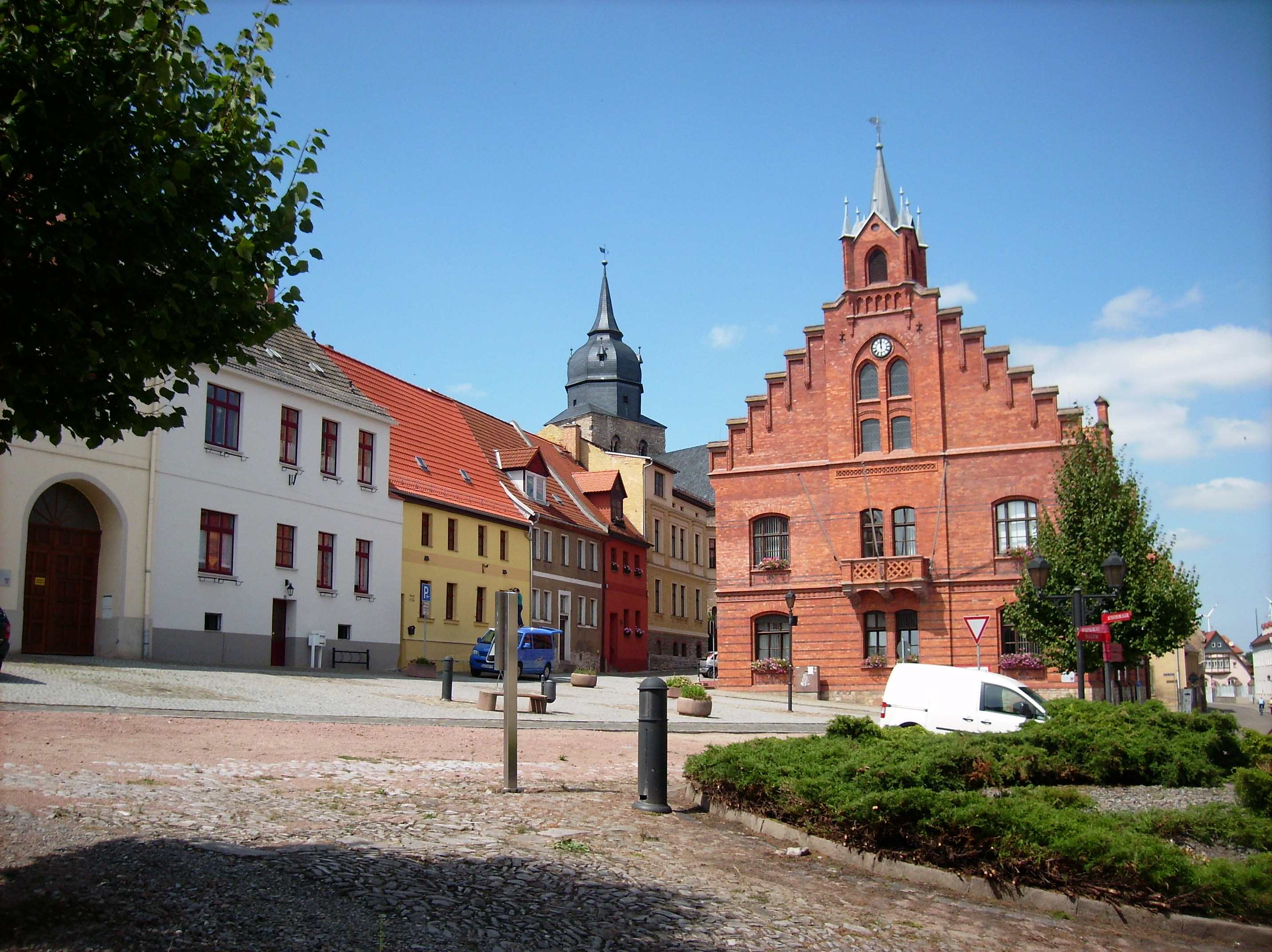
- Town hall

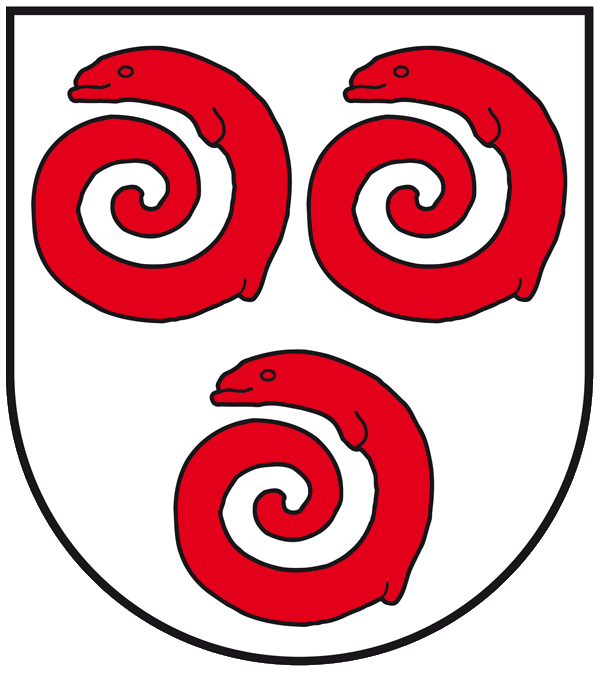
- Coat of arms

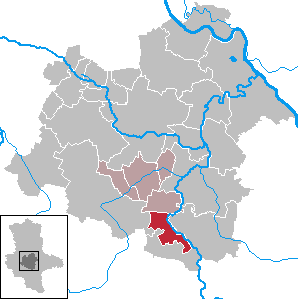
- Location of Alsleben within Salzlandkreis district
- Interactive map of Alsleben
- Location within Germany Location within Saxony-Anhalt
- Coordinates: 51°42′N 11°40′E
- Country: Germany
- State: Saxony-Anhalt
- District: Salzlandkreis
- Municipal assoc.: Saale-Wipper

Government
  - Mayor (2021–28): Alexander Siersleben

Area
  - Total: 23.64 km^{2} (9.13 sq mi)
- Elevation: 85 m (279 ft)

Population (2025-12-31)
  - Total: 2,518
  - Density: 106.5/km^{2} (275.9/sq mi)
- Time zone: UTC+01:00 (CET)
  - Summer (DST): UTC+02:00 (CEST)
- Postal codes: 06425
- Dialling codes: 034692
- Vehicle registration: SLK
- Website: www.alsleben-saale-online.de

Alsleben (pronounced [ˈalsleːbm̩]) is a town in the district of Salzlandkreis, in Saxony-Anhalt, Germany. It is situated on the river Saale, south of Bernburg. It is part of the Verbandsgemeinde ("collective municipality") Saale-Wipper.

== People ==
=== Notable persons born in Alsleben ===
- Johann Friedrich Ahlfeld (1843–1929), gynecologist
- Wolfgang Herrmann (1904–1945), Nazi librarian
- Fritz Schaper (1841–1919), sculptor and professor, creator of the relief in the gable of the Reichstags
- Bruno Tzschuck (1826-1912), German-American politician, soldier, diplomat, and newspaper editor

=== Notable persons who resided in Alsleben ===
- Johann Friedrich Ahlfeld (theologian)
