= Heider SV =

German football club

- Full name: Heider Sportverein von 1925 e. V.
- Nickname: kleiner HSV
- Founded: 1925
- Ground: Stadion an der Meldorfer Straße
- Capacity: 11,000
- Manager: Sönke Beiroth
- League: Oberliga Schleswig-Holstein (V)
- 2025–26: Oberliga Schleswig-Holstein, 6th of 18
- Website: https://www.heidersv.de/de/startseite/
Home colours	Away colours

Heider SV is a German association football club from the city of Heide, Schleswig-Holstein. The club was founded 14 October 1925 by what was the reserve side of VfL 05 Heide. The reservists thought they were the better side and challenged the first team to a match, which they won. Despite this, no changes were made to the first team roster, so the reservists left to form SV.

== History ==
=== Small town on the big stage ===
The team is known popularly as kleiner HSV (en: Little HSV), a play on the name of better known Hamburger SV. They represented the smallest town competing in top-flight German competition in the regional Oberliga Nord (I) in 1956–57 and 1960–61 against the likes of larger clubs including Hamburger SV, Hannover 96, Werder Bremen, and FC St. Pauli. The club's appearances in the top flight were brief, but they were enthusiastically supported, regularly drawing large crowds. The highlight of Heider SV's 1956–57 season was a 2–0 victory over Hamburger SV before a crowd of 12,000, an attendance record that still stands to this day.

In 1951, 1953, and 1955, Heider SV took part in the country's amateur championship with their best result coming as an advance to the semi-finals in 1955 where they were lost 3–1 to Sportfreunde Siegen. The club also made failed attempts to return to Oberliga play in 1954, 1958, 1959, and 1962.

=== Post-Bundesliga ===
After the formation of the Bundesliga, Germany's first fully profession league, in 1963, Heider SV became part of the Amateurliga Schleswig-Holstein (III) after failing to qualify for the new Regionalliga Nord (II). The team did eventually win its way to the Regionalliga for a single season in 1968–69, and again for a four-season stint between 1970 and 1974. After slipping down through the Amateurliga, Heider SV became a fixture in fourth-tier play in the Landesliga Schleswig-Holstein (1975–78), the Verbandsliga Schleswig-Holstein (1978–94), and the Oberliga Hamburg/Schleswig-Holstein (1994–2004), before finally falling to fifth-tier play in the Verbandsliga Schleswig-Holstein in 2004. Although generally a mid-table finisher, Heider SV continued to field competitive sides through the years, earning four second-place results, as well as a Verbandsliga Schleswig-Holstein (IV) title in 1982–83.

The club has made occasional appearances in competition for the DFB-Pokal (German Cup), but has never advanced out of the opening round.

After losing a promotion round playoff to Arminia Hannover in 1997, the club struggled, delivering poor performances, losing the support of its fans and sponsors, and facing financial problems. Their situation has since stabilized and they currently play in the Schleswig-Holstein-Liga (V).

== Honours ==
The club's honours:

- Amateurliga Schleswig-Holstein (II)
  - Champions: 1956, 1958, 1959, 1960, 1962, 1963
- Verbandsliga Schleswig-Holstein (IV)
  - Champions: 1983
- Schleswig-Holstein Cup (Tiers III-V)
  - Winners: 1979, 1982, 1995

== Stadium ==
SV plays its home matches in the Stadion an der Meldorfer Straße, which has a capacity of 11,000 (1,500 seats).

== Notable players ==
- Willi Gerdau, capped in 1957, the only national team player to come out of Schleswig-Holstein since 1931.
