= Willi Gerdau =

German footballer

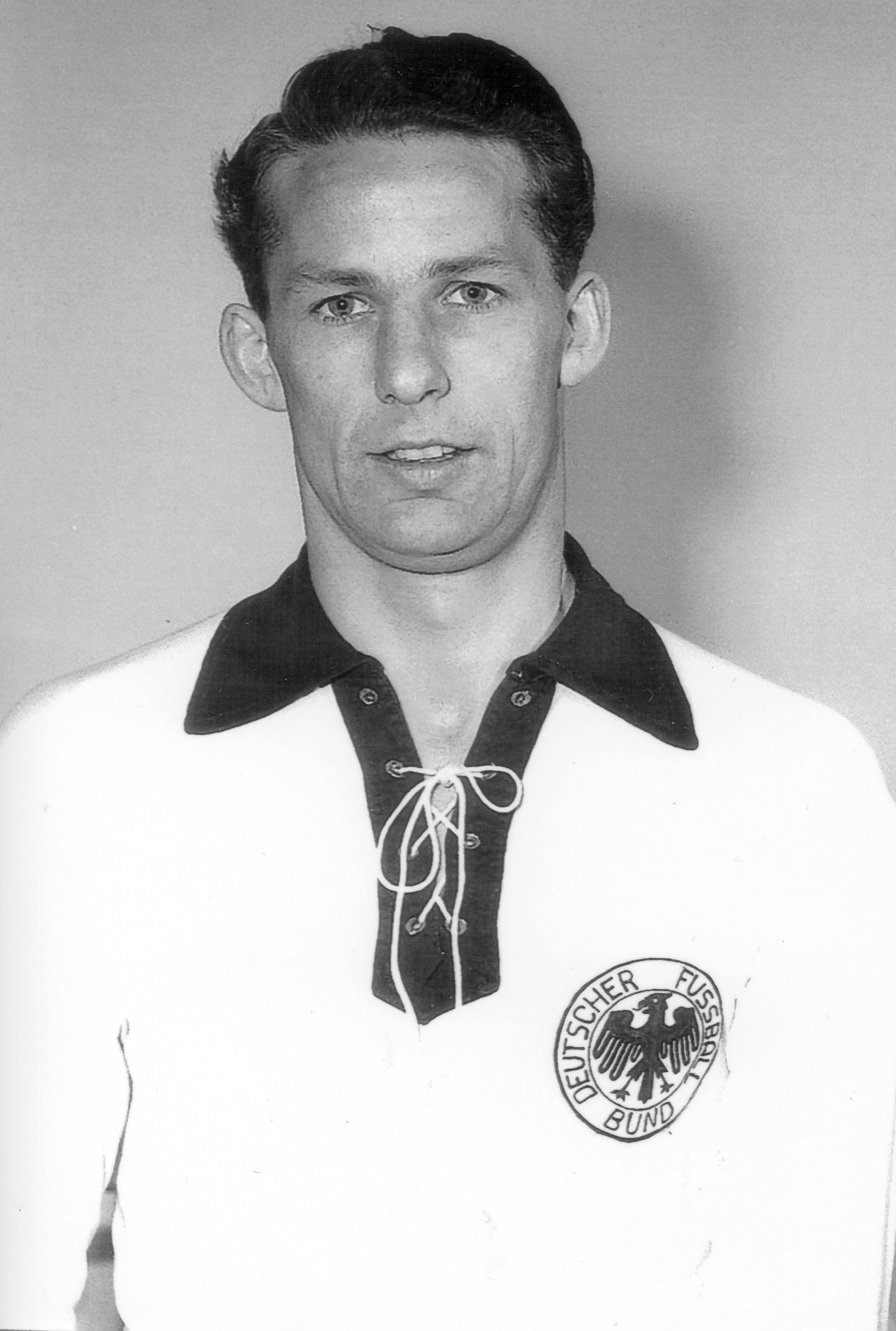

Personal information
- Full name: Willi Gerdau
- Date of birth: 12 February 1929
- Place of birth: Heide, Germany
- Date of death: 11 February 2011 (aged 81)
- Place of death: Uetersen, Germany
- Position: Midfielder

Senior career*
Years	Team	Apps	(Gls)
1945–1963	Heider SV		

International career
1957	West Germany	1	(0)
- * Club domestic league appearances and goals

Willi Gerdau (12 February 1929 – 11 February 2021) was a German international footballer. Born in Heide, Gerdau played as a defender for Heider SV, and won one cap for West Germany in 1957 in a match against Scotland. He also competed in the 1956 Summer Olympics.
