= Bruno Tzschuck =

American diplomat (1826–1912)

Member of the Nebraska Senate
- In office elected 1886

Member of the Nebraska House of Representatives
- In office elected 1873

Personal details
- Born: Bruno von Tzschuck; February 17, 1826 Alsleben, Province of Saxony, Kingdom of Prussia
- Died: February 6, 1912 (aged 85) Omaha, Nebraska, United States
- Resting place: Forest Lawn Memorial Park
- Party: Republican
- Occupation: Farmer, soldier, politician, diplomat, newspaper editor

Bruno Tzschuck (17 February 1826 – 6 February 1912) was a German-American farmer, soldier, politician, diplomat, and newspaper editor. He served as the 4th Secretary of State of Nebraska from 1875 to 1879.

== Early life ==
Tzschuck was born Bruno von Tzschuck on 17 February 1826 as the son of Ferdinand von Tzschuck, chief of the internal revenue department of Prussia, and his wife Wilhelmina. He was educated by private tutors and at the Luther College in Eisleben. Tzschuck was a lieutenant in the Prussian army from 1846 to 1851, being wounded several times while serving in the First Schleswig War with Denmark. Tzschuck emigrated to America in 1851 with two friends and settled for a time near Davenport, Iowa, where he married Mary Schmidt (1828-1912) in 1852. After their marriage he went to work for trader Peter A. Sarpy and in 1853 moved to just south of Bellevue in what was soon to become Nebraska Territory. In 1855 he began to farm there and made that his home until moving to Omaha in 1880. He served in the Union Army as a captain of engineers from 1861 to 1862.

== Career ==
A Republican, Tzschuck served in the Nebraska House of Representatives in 1873. From 1875 to 1879 he was the elected secretary of state and also adjutant general of the state militia. In 1880 he was one of the Census supervisors for Nebraska. Tzschuck was appointed US consul at Veracruz, Mexico in 1882 and served there until at least 1884. He was elected to a term in the Nebraska Senate in 1886. Tzschuck also founded and edited a weekly German language newspaper named Die Westliche Courier.

== Family ==
Tzschuck and his wife had six children: Clara Tzschuck Hoffmayr (1854-1883), George B. Tzschuck (1856-1910), Bruno Tzschuck Jr. (1857-1892), Alice Tzschuck Meyer (1860-1929), Agnes Tzschuck (1862-1944), and Marie Antoinette Tzschuck Gerber (1873-1950). He is buried in Forest Lawn Memorial Park in Omaha.
