= Carl Siegmund Franz Credé =

German gynecologist and obstetrician

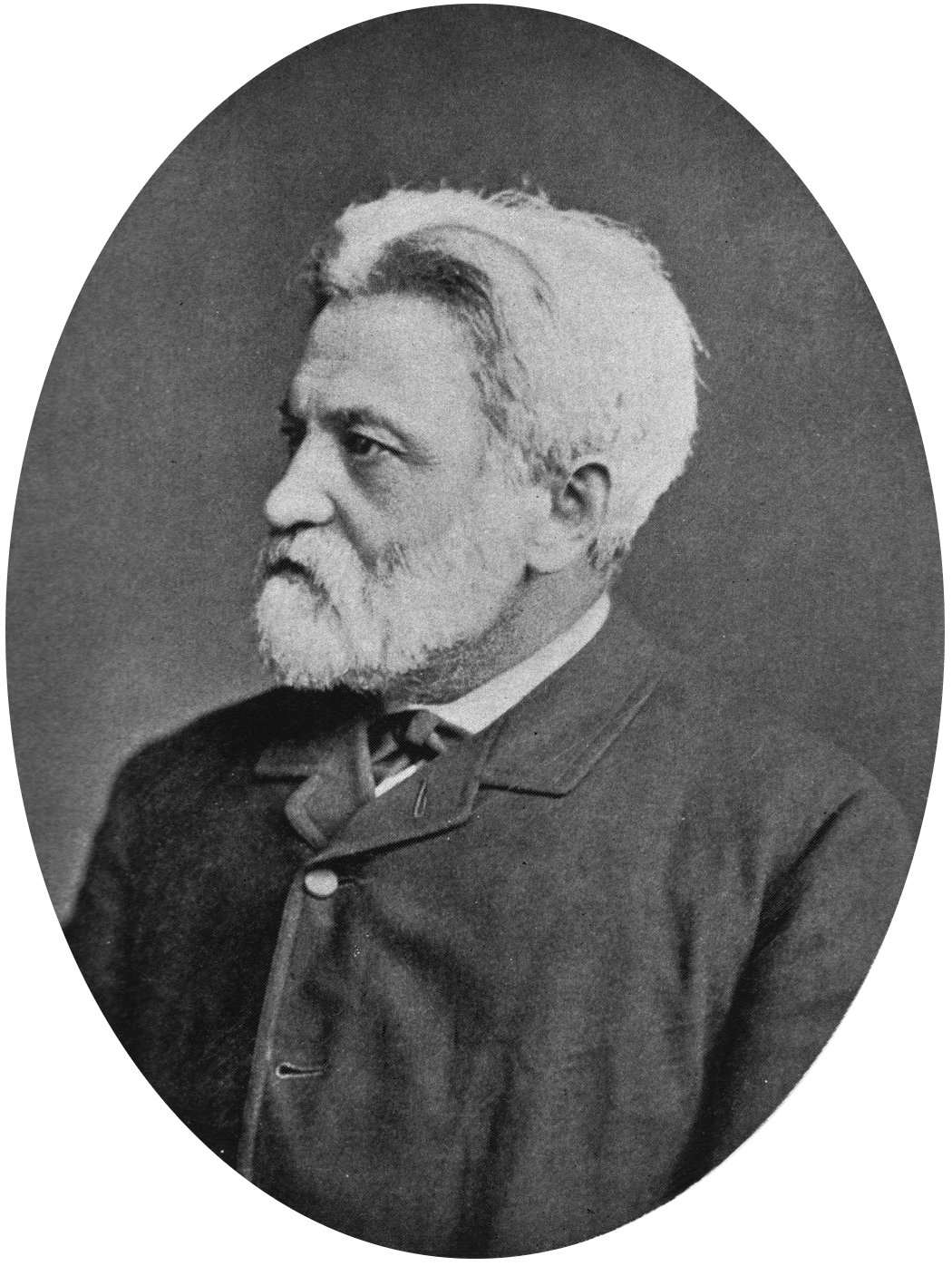
- Born: Carl Siegmund Franz Credé; 23 December 1819
- Died: 14 March 1892 (aged 72)

Carl Siegmund Franz Credé (23 December 1819 – 14 March 1892) was a German gynecologist and obstetrician born in Berlin, most famous for preventing neonatal conjunctivitis via Credé's prophylaxis, a dilute silver nitrate solution dropped into the eye immediately after birth, thus saving the eyesight of millions.

In 1842 he received his doctorate from the University of Berlin. In 1852 he became director of the "Berlin School of Midwives" and chief physician of the maternity division at the Berlin Charité. Later he was appointed professor of obstetrics and director of the maternity hospital in Leipzig. In Berlin and Leipzig, Credé established out-patient gynecology clinics. He was the father of surgeon Benno Credé (1847–1929) and a father-in-law to gynecologist Christian Gerhard Leopold (1846–1912). Among his better known students at Leipzig was gynecologist Johann Friedrich Ahlfeld (1843–1929).

Carl Credé is famous for introducing the use of silver nitrate eyedrops as an antiseptic for the prevention of neonatal conjunctivitis. He used a 2% silver nitrate solution, and first demonstrated its effectiveness in the early 1880s. During a three-year period, Credé treated 1160 newborns with silver nitrate, with only 0.15% of the infants developing ophthalmia. The silver nitrate solution is sometimes referred to as "Credé's prophylaxis" in medical literature, and other eyedrop prophylactics (for example, antibiotics) are still called by the same name. Later, the solution was diluted to 1% silver nitrate, and became a standard practice in obstetrics. As neonatal conjunctivitis used to occur in around 10% of newborns and cause about half of all cases of blindness in Europe, Credé is credited with saving the eyesight of millions. The original procedure called for a 2% silver nitrate solution administered immediately after birth, as Credé erroneously believed that a 1% solution was ineffective due to a previous study by Hecker; however, this was eventually corrected and reduced back down to a 1% solution to reduce chemical irritation to the newborn's eyes.

Credé is also credited for implementing a procedure to hasten delivery of the placenta; it being named Credé's manoeuvre. From 1853 to 1869, he edited the "Monatsschrift für Geburtskunde", and from 1870 onward, was an editor of the "Archiv für Gynäkologie".

== Selected works ==
- Klinische Vorträge über Geburtshilfe, two volumes, Berlin, 1853-1854 – Clinical lectures on midwifery.
- Ueber Erwärmungsgeräthe für frühgeborene und schwächliche kleine Kinder, (a treatise on warming devices for prematures and feeble tiny children) Mittheilungen aus der geburtshüflichen Klinik in Leipzig. "Archiv für Gynäkologie", 1884, 24: 128–147.
- Die Verhütung der Augenentzündung der Neugeborenen. 1884 – The prevention of ophthalmia of the newborn.
