= Johann Friedrich Ahlfeld (theologian) =

German Lutheran theologian and preacher

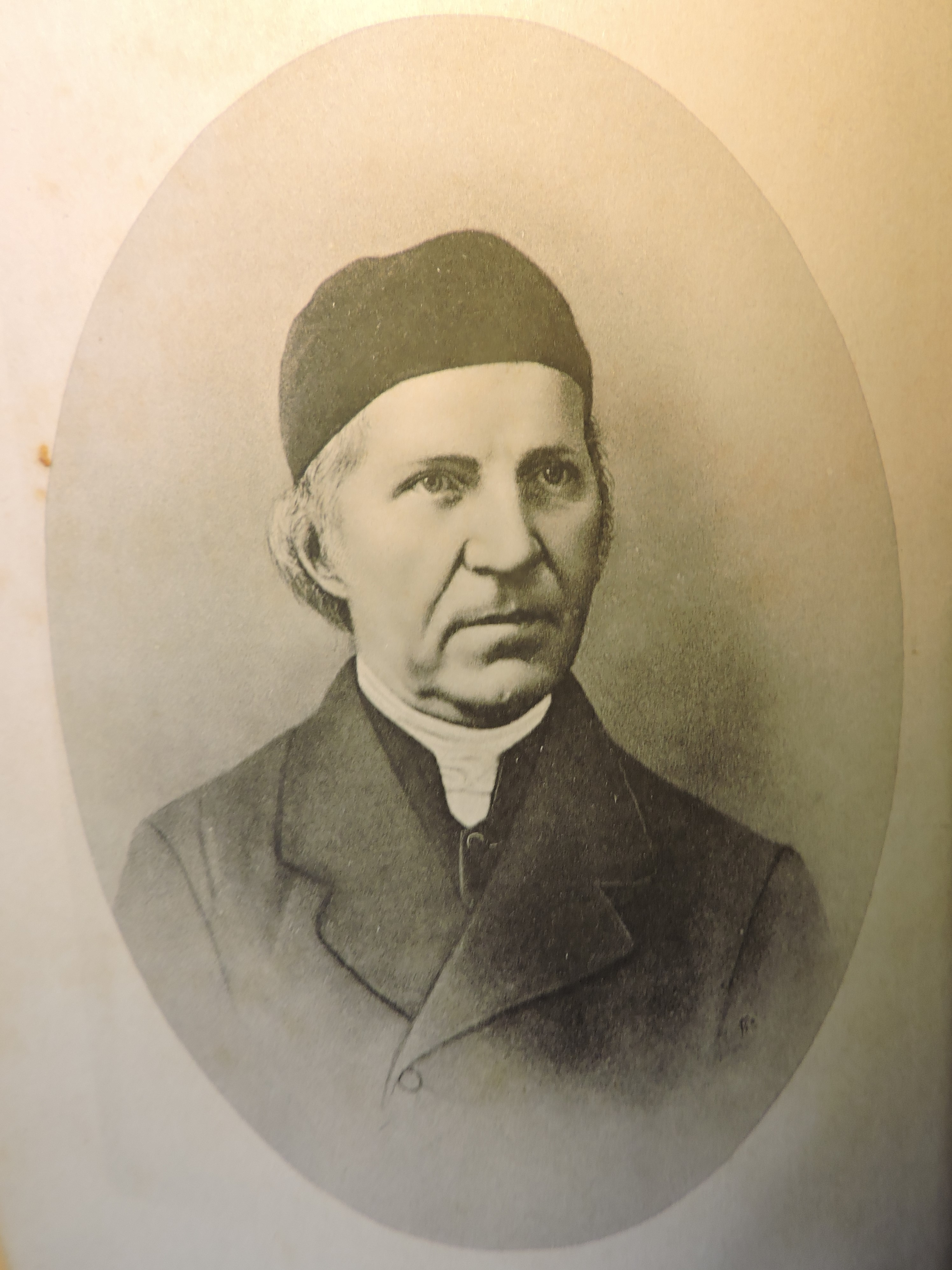
Johann Friedrich Ahlfeld

Johann Friedrich Ahlfeld (born 1 November 1810 in Mehringen, administrative subdivision of Aschersleben in the Kingdom of Westphalia and died 4 March 1884 in Leipzig) was a German Lutheran theologian and preacher.

== Life ==
The son of a carpenter, he attended secondary school in Aschersleben and Dessau and studied theology in Halle with Carl Ullmann and the historian Heinrich Leo.

He was pastor of Alsleben from 1838 to 1847, of Halle and Leipzig from 1851 to 1881.

He was an important Lutheran preacher.

== Works ==
- Predigten über die evangelischen Perikopen, Leipzig 1848–1849.
- Sonntagsgnade und Sonntagssünde. Vier Predigten 1850
- Staat, Haus und Herz in und außer der Kirche Christi. Vortrag. 1851.
- Katechismuspredigten. Drei Bände, 1852.
- Das Leben im Lichte des Wortes Gottes. Ein Lebensbuch insbesondere für Confirmanden und Brautpaare. 1858.
- Predigten an Sonn- und Festtagen. I. „Die Ruhe der Kinder Gottes in dem Herrn. Drei Bände, 1850–1861; II. Bausteine zum Aufbau der Gemeinde. Sechs Bände, 1852–1856 (1. Bd. 4. Aufl. 1862; 2. und 3. Bd. 3. Aufl. 1857 und 1859). III. Zeugnisse aus dem inneren Leben. Drei Bände, 1860 bis 1864.
- Weckstimmen aus dem Jahre 1866. Acht Predigten. 1867.
- Das rothe Buch. Aus Kreuz und Freude einer Kaufmannsfamilie. Erzählung. 1867.
- Predigten über die epistolischen Perikopen, 1867.
- Bruder Berthold von Regensburg, der große deutsche Prediger des Mittelalters. Vortrag. 1874.
- Ein Kirchenjahr in Predigten. 1875.
- Zehn Predigten nach der Feier seiner 25jährigen Amtsführung als Prediger zu St. Nicolai in Leipzig. 1876.
- Confirmationsreden aus den Jahren 1868–1879, 1880.
- Erzählungen für das Volk, 5. Aufl., Halle 1881
- Morgenandachten. Aus den Predigten von D. Friedr. Ahlfeld. 1882.
- Abendandachten. Aus den Predigten von D. Friedr. Ahlfeld. 1884.
- Predigten über freie Texte.
