= Wolfgang Herrmann (librarian) =

German librarian and Nazi

Wolfgang Herrmann (March 14, 1904 – April 1945 near Brno) was a German librarian and member of the Nazi Party, whose blacklist provided the template for the Nazi book burnings in May 1933.

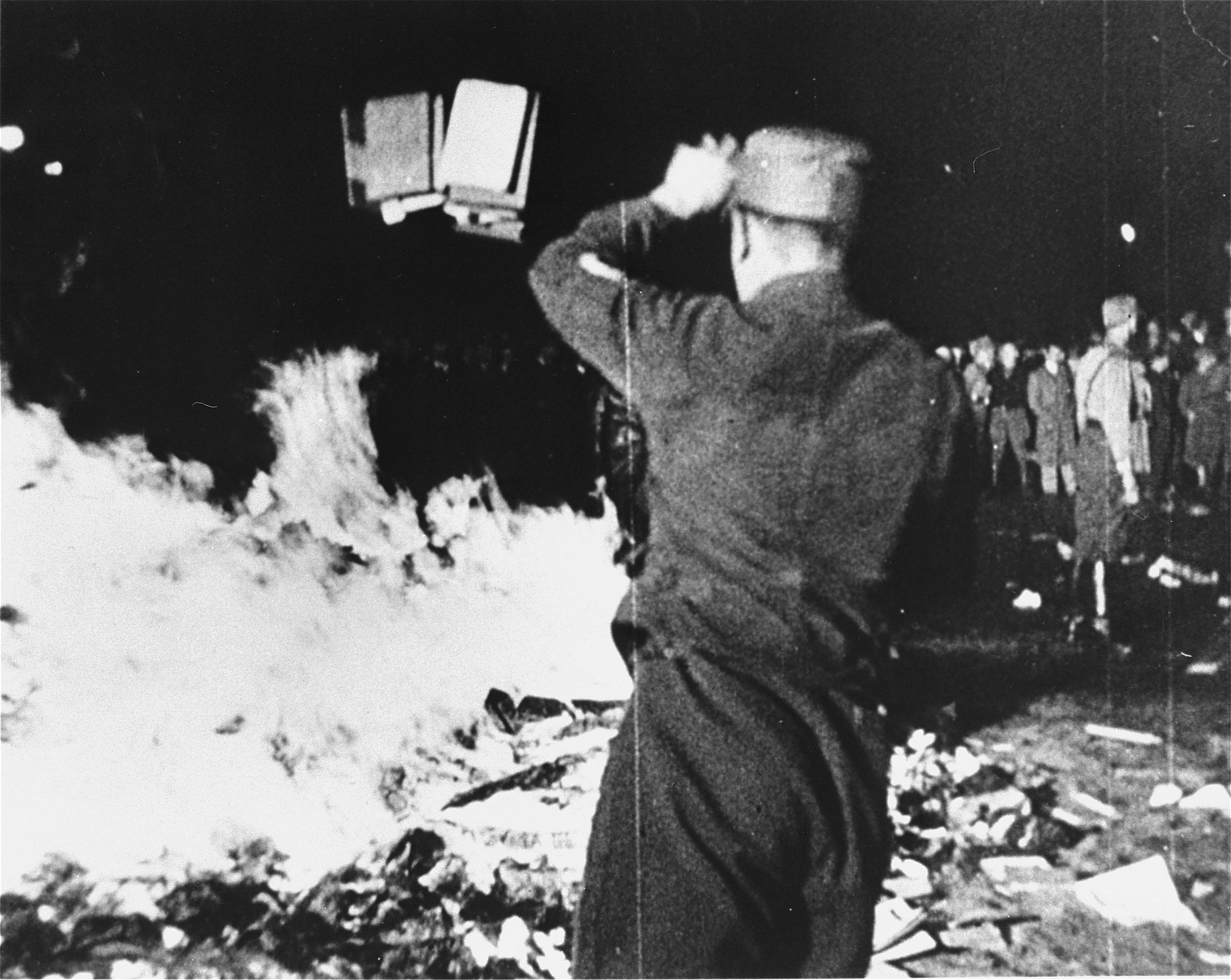
Book burning in Berlin, May 1933.

== Biographical details ==
Herrmann was born in Alsleben. While still in school, he joined the Deutschvölkischer Jugendbund. He studied modern history at the Ludwig-Maximilians-Universität München, receiving his doctorate in 1928. In 1929, he worked at the Volksbibliothek in Breslau and became involved in library policy in line with a Nazi outlook.

In 1931, he went to work at the Stettin municipal library, lasting only months in the position before he was let go in October. Also in 1931, he applied for admission into the Nazi Party, where he was aligned with the party's left wing under brothers Gregor and Otto Strasser. In 1933, at the age of 29, he headed the Zentralstelle für das deutsche Bibliothekswesen in Berlin. In April 1934, he became the library director in Königsberg, Prussia. In 1936, he became the political leader.

Herrmann served in the Wehrmacht during the entirety of World War II. He died under unclear circumstances, but was likely killed near Brno in April 1945.

== Book lists ==
In April 1933, after the Nazis seized power, a committee met in Berlin to establish a "new order" for Berlin public libraries. Herrmann was a member of the committee. For several years, he had already been preparing lists of literature to weed out, which he brought to the new committee. Herrmann's first lists served to indicate works that libraries should refrain from lending. However, he also had lists of books to recommend, such as Hitler – ein deutsches Verhängnis by Ernst Niekisch and Adolf Hitler, Wilhelm der Dritte by Weigand von Miltenberg (pen name of Herbert Blank), but set little store with Hitler's Mein Kampf. As a result, shortly after the book burnings, the Nazi Party press treated him negatively. (Note: Herrmann initiated court proceedings within the Nazi Party on December 12, 1936, which were dropped on an order from Hitler from April 27, 1938.)

At the beginning of 1933, the German student organization, the Deutsche Studentenschaft (DSt) asked Herrmann to make his blacklist of "harmful and undesirable literature" available to them; it then became the foundation for the book burnings. Decades of research into the Nazi era has found neither the book burnings of May 10, 1933 nor the blacklist created by Herrmann to have been commissioned or directed by the Ministry of Public Enlightenment and Propaganda.

The book burnings were by and large organized by the DSt, albeit with support from the Reichsministerium. Likewise, Herrmann's blacklist, created on his own initiative, arose from his Nazi convictions. Not until later did Goebbels and his Ministry – after a long power struggle with Alfred Rosenberg – assume sole guidance of literature policy.

== Blacklist and book burnings ==
The first "List of Books Worth Burning" appeared in the publication, Berliner Nachtausgabe on March 26, 1933. Preliminary and incomplete, it was soon replaced by a more thorough index. A month later, Herrmann began creating further lists of authors based on his blacklist, which he sent to the DSt for their "Action against the Un-German Spirit". Using these lists, student shock troops searched the libraries of universities and institutions and, beginning May 6, 1933, bookshops and lending libraries, removing the "harmful and undesirable literature". Public libraries were then pressured to "clean up" their own stocks; the books culled were to be handed over to the DSt for public book burnings on May 10, 1933.

Herrmann's blacklist was republished on May 16, 1933, in Börsenblatt, a weekly trade publication for German bookstores, as Prussia's first official list of banned books.

== See also ==
- List of authors banned during the Third Reich

== Sources ==
- Ernst Klee, Das Kulturlexikon zum Dritten Reich. Wer war was vor und nach 1945. S. Fischer, Frankfurt am Main (2007), p. 237 (in German)
- Gerhard Sauder (Ed.), Die Bücherverbrennung. Zum 10. Mai 1933. Carl Hanser, Munich and Vienna (1983), p. 103 ff. (in German)
- Siegfried Schliebs, "Verboten, verbrannt verfolgt … Wolfgang Hermann und seine „Schwarze Liste. Schöne Literatur“ vom Mai 1933 - Der Fall des Volksbibliothekars Dr. Wolfgang Hermann" in: Hermann Haarmann, Walter Huder, Klaus Siebenhaar (Eds.): „Das war ein Vorspiel nur …“ - Bücherverbrennung Deutschland 1933: Voraussetzungen und Folgen. Catalog of exhibit of the same name, Akademie der Künste, Berlin (1983), pp. 442-444. Medusa Verlagsgesellschaft, Berlin/Vienna (1983). ISBN 3-88602-076-2 (in German)
- Ulrich Walberer (Ed.), 10. Mai 1933. Bücherverbrennung in Deutschland und die Folgen. S. Fischer, Frankfurt am Main (1983) (in German)
- Volker Weidermann, Das Buch der verbrannten Bücher. Kiepenheuer & Witsch, Cologne (2008), pp. 17-20. ISBN 978-3-462-03962-7 (in German)
- In jenen Tagen... Schriftsteller zwischen Reichstagsbrand und Bücherverbrennung. Eine Dokumentation. Gustav Kiepenheuer Verlag, Leipzig und Weimar (1983) (in German)
