= Alfred Dührssen =

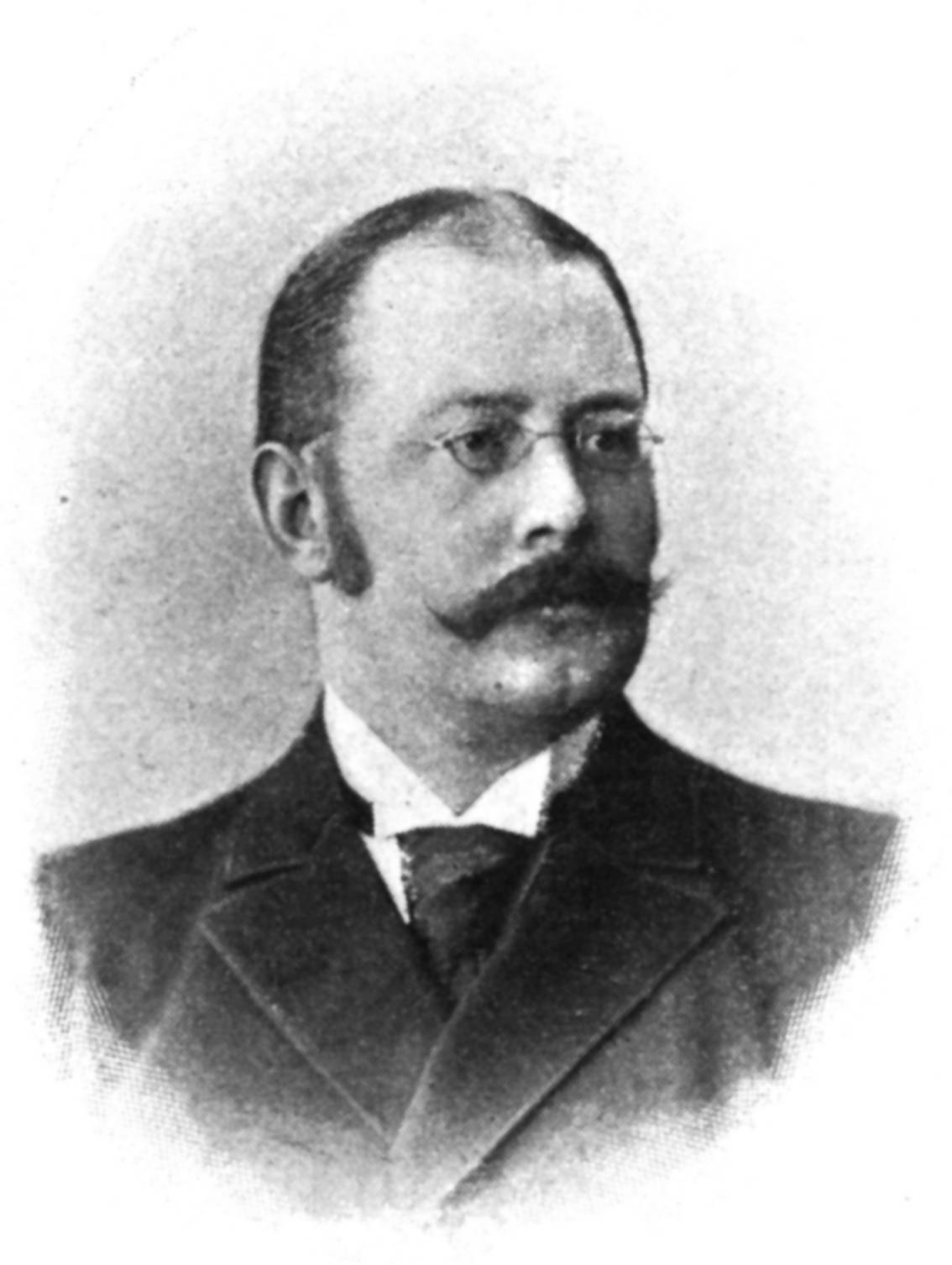
Alfred Dührssen (1862-1933)

Alfred Dührssen (23 March 1862 – 11 October 1933) was a German gynecologist and obstetrician born in Heide, Schleswig-Holstein, at the time part of Denmark.

He studied medicine at the University of Marburg, as well as the Kaiser-Wilhelm-Akademie für das militärärztliche Bildungswesen (Kaiser-Wilhelm-Academy for Military Physicians). In 1886, he became an obstetrical assistant to Adolf Gusserow (1836-1906) in Berlin, and in 1888 he began work as a lecturer at the University of Berlin. In 1892 he opened a private clinic for obstetrics and gynecological diseases.

Dührssen was a prominent figure in modern German gynecology, being remembered for his pioneer work in surgical practices such as vaginal Caesarean section (vaginalen Kaiserschnitt). He was an advocate of institutional births for all pregnancies, and proposed that pregnant women undergo screening processes to uncover possible difficulties prior to giving birth.

== Associated eponym ==
- Dührssen incisions: Incisions made in the cervix as a means of effecting immediate delivery of the fetus.

== Selected writings ==
- Geburtshülfliches Vedemecum für Studierende und Ärzte (Gynecological handbook for students and doctors); (1890).
- Über Heilung und Verhütung von Frauenkrankheiten (Treatment and prevention of diseases relating to women); (1900).
- Die neue Geburtshilfe (Modern obstetrics); (1923).
