= Heide =

- Town
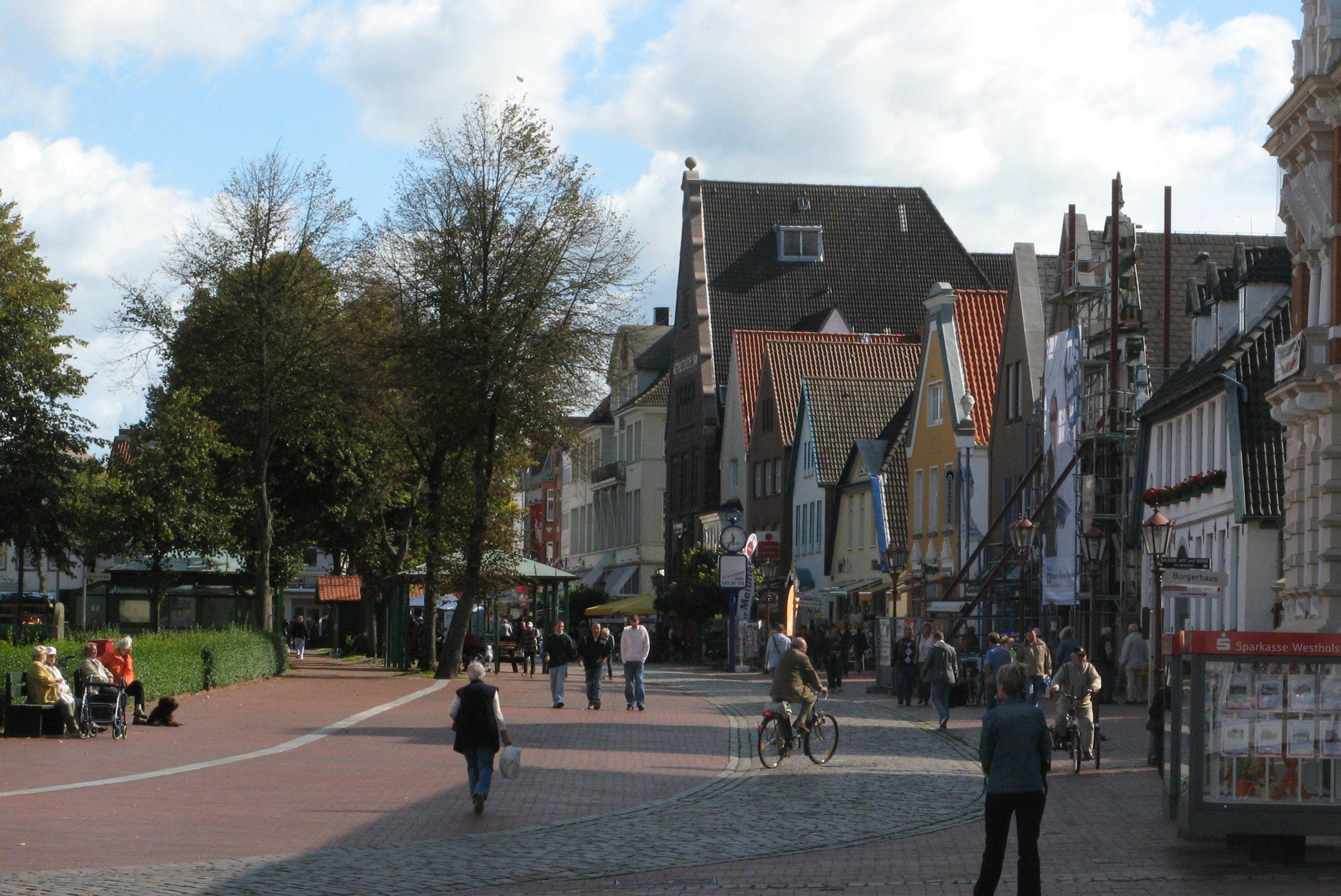

- Flag Coat of arms

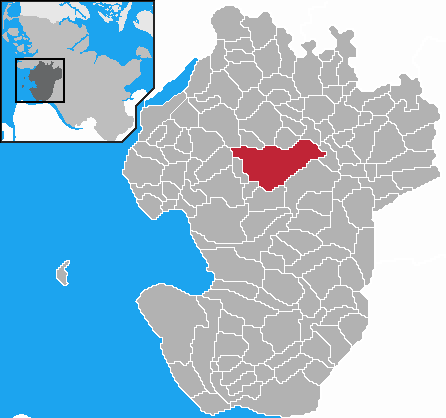
- Location of Heide within Dithmarschen district
- Interactive map of Heide
- Location within Germany Location within Schleswig-Holstein
- Coordinates: 54°11′46″N 9°5′36″E
- Country: Germany
- State: Schleswig-Holstein
- District: Dithmarschen

Government
  - Mayor: Oliver Schmidt-Gutzat (SPD)

Area
  - Total: 31.97 km^{2} (12.34 sq mi)
- Elevation: 11 m (36 ft)

Population (2025-12-31)
  - Total: 22,125
  - Density: 692.1/km^{2} (1,792/sq mi)
- Time zone: UTC+01:00 (CET)
  - Summer (DST): UTC+02:00 (CEST)
- Postal codes: 25746
- Dialling codes: 0481
- Vehicle registration: HEI, MED
- Website: www.heide.de

Heide (German pronunciation: [ˈhaɪdə]; Holsatian: Heid) is a town in Schleswig-Holstein, Germany. It is the capital of the Kreis (district) Dithmarschen. Population: 22,000.

The German word Heide means "heath". In the 15th century four adjoining villages decided to build a church in the "middle of the heath". This remained the town's name to date. The exact foundation date is now unknown, but by 1447 Heide was already the main village of Dithmarschen. At this time Dithmarschen was an independent peasant republic. Heide became a town in the 19th century.

Heide has the largest un-built-upon market square in Germany, with 4.7 hectares. It is used primarily as a parking lot and has approximately 500 parking spaces. In 2016, the city staged 3 car-free Sundays on the market square for the first time.

== Sport ==
The association soccer club Heider SV plays in the Oberliga Schleswig-Holstein (V).

== Education ==
There are some notable educational institutes in the town

- BTZ Heide gGmbH
- RKiSH-Akademie
- Volkshochschule Heide
- Fachhochschule Westküste Institut für die Transformation des Energiesystems (ITE)

== Notable landmarks ==
- St. Jürgen church (1560)
- Water tower (1903)
- Museum of Dithmarschen History
- Brahmshaus, dwelling house of the ancestors of the composer Johannes Brahms, now a museum

== Notable people ==
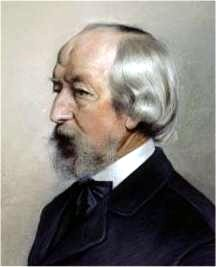
Klaus Groth, 1888

- Klaus Groth (1819–1899), a Low German poet
- Johannes Brahms (1833–1897), composer; his father came from Heide
- Paul Christoph Hennings (1841–1908), mycologist and herbarium curator.
- Alfred Dührssen (1862–1933), gynecologist and obstetrician
- Rudolph Dirks (1877–1968), comic-strip artist
- Carl-Heinz Rodenberg (1904–1995), neurologist and psychiatrist, proficient in the murder of mental patients by the Nazis
- Hauke Harder (born 1963), composer and experimental physicist.
- Klaus Florian Vogt (born 1970), operatic tenor; sings roles written by Richard Wagner.

=== Sport ===
- Willi Gerdau (1929–2011), international footballer
- Julian Grundt (born 1988), former footballer
- Fritz Thiedemann (1918–2000), equestrian

== International relations ==
There is a twinning between Kreis Dithmarschen and Restormel Borough Council.

- Restormel, England, United Kingdom
- Nowogard, Poland
- Anklam, Germany

== Climate ==
Climate data for Elpersbüttel (Note: Elpersbüttel is located approximately 14 kilometres (8.7 mi) south of Heide.) (1991–2020 normals)
Month	Jan	Feb	Mar	Apr	May	Jun	Jul	Aug	Sep	Oct	Nov	Dec	Year
Mean daily maximum °C (°F)	3.9 (39.0)	4.3 (39.7)	7.9 (46.2)	13.2 (55.8)	16.8 (62.2)	19.6 (67.3)	22.1 (71.8)	22.0 (71.6)	18.5 (65.3)	13.4 (56.1)	8.5 (47.3)	5.2 (41.4)	13.1 (55.6)
Daily mean °C (°F)	2.0 (35.6)	2.1 (35.8)	4.5 (40.1)	8.6 (47.5)	12.4 (54.3)	15.6 (60.1)	17.7 (63.9)	17.6 (63.7)	14.4 (57.9)	10.5 (50.9)	6.2 (43.2)	3.3 (37.9)	9.6 (49.3)
Mean daily minimum °C (°F)	−0.6 (30.9)	−0.6 (30.9)	1.0 (33.8)	4.0 (39.2)	7.6 (45.7)	10.8 (51.4)	13.0 (55.4)	13.0 (55.4)	10.5 (50.9)	6.9 (44.4)	3.6 (38.5)	0.9 (33.6)	5.9 (42.6)
Average relative humidity (%)	91.0	88.6	85.2	78.7	77.5	78.8	79.2	80.5	83.9	88.4	91.7	92.0	83.6
Mean monthly sunshine hours	44.7	75.7	140.7	212.1	241.0	226.8	234.1	208.1	153.5	104.5	54.6	40.1	1,739.4
Source: NOAA

== Gallery ==
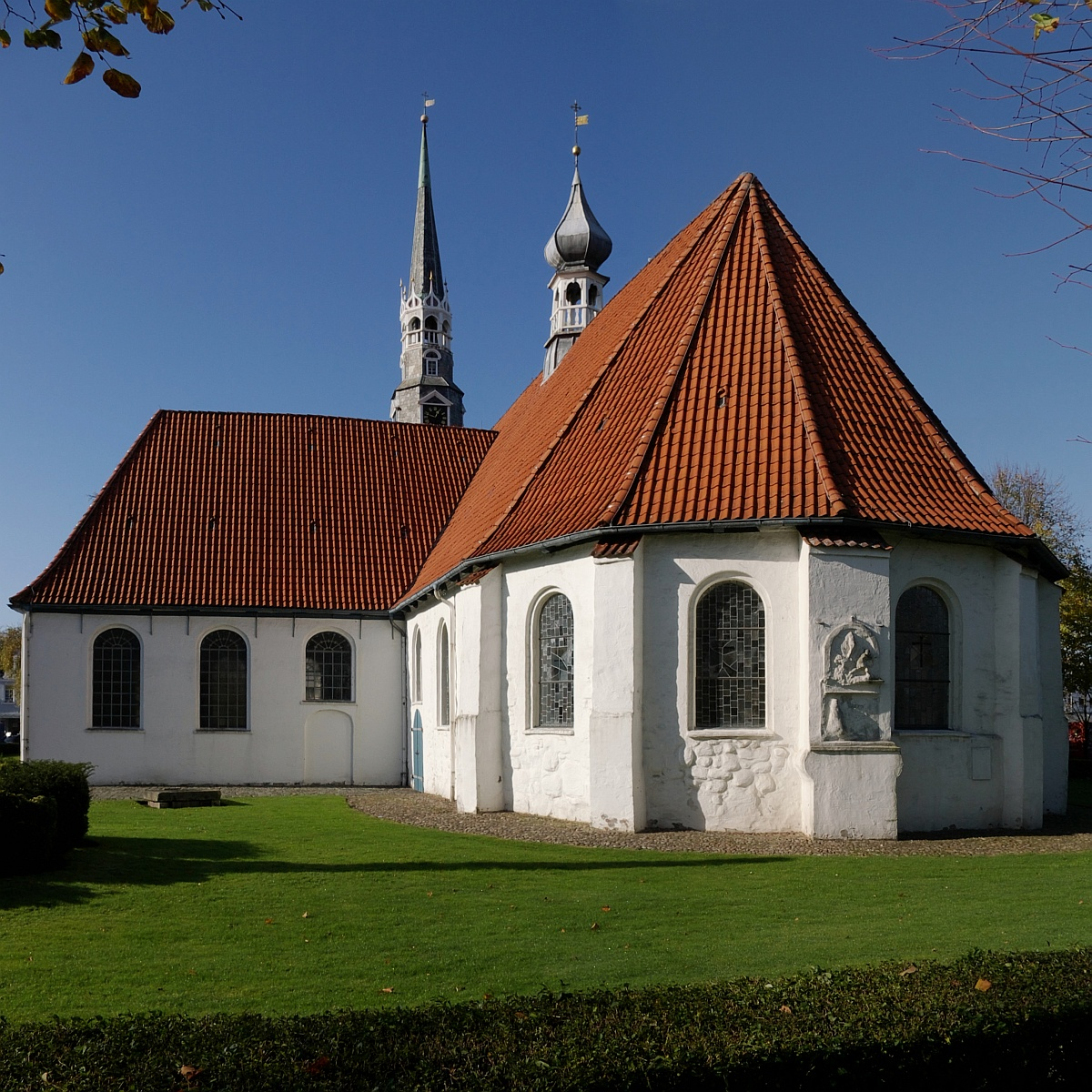
St. Jürgen-Kirche (1560)

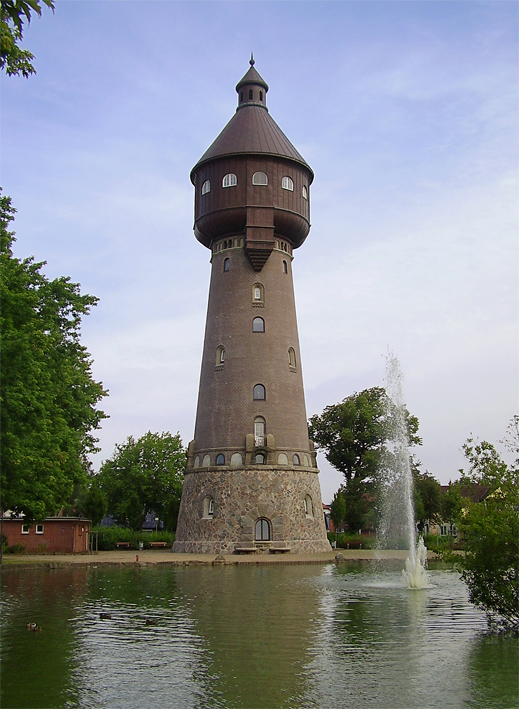
Water tower (1903)

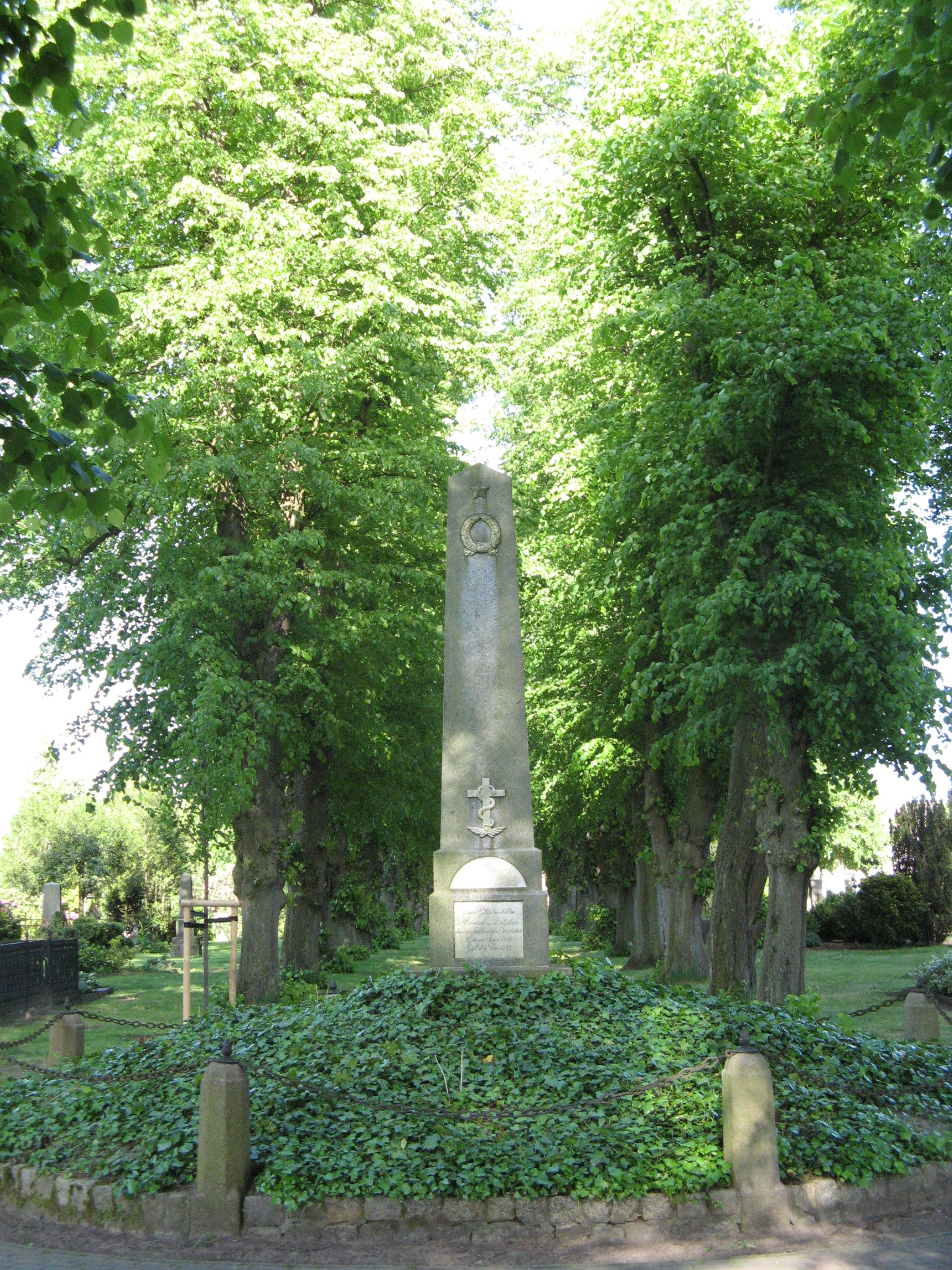
Heinrich von Zütphen memorial

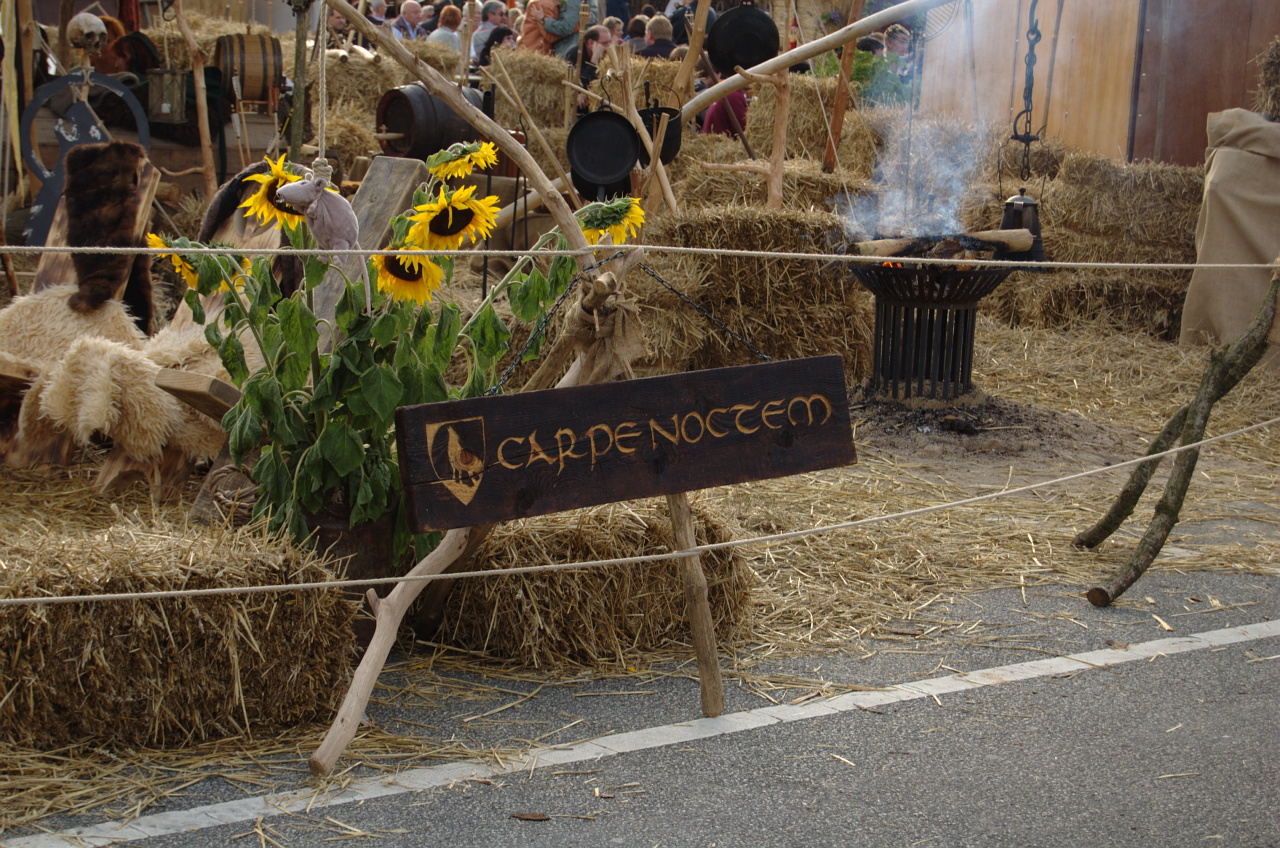
carpe noctem sign at the medieval market 2008 in Heide
