= Credé's prophylaxis =

Medical procedure performed on newborns

Credé procedure
- ICD-10-PCS: T81.40XA

Credé prophylaxis is the practice of washing a newborn's eyes with a 1% silver nitrate solution to protect against neonatal conjunctivitis caused by Neisseria gonorrhoeae, thereby preventing blindness.

The Credé procedure was developed by the German physician Carl Siegmund Franz Credé who implemented it in his hospital in Leipzig in 1880. Between 1881 and 1883, Credé published three papers in Archiv für Gynäkologie, each titled "Die Verhütung der Augenentzündung der Neugeborenen" (Prevention of inflammatory eye disease in the newborn), describing his method and its results. (Note: In 2001, the World Health Organization selected the first paper of this series as a "ground-breaking contribution to public health" and published an English translation along with expert commentary in the Bulletin of the World Health Organization.) The original procedure called for a 2% silver nitrate solution administered immediately after birth, as Credé erroneously believed that a 1% solution was ineffective due to a previous study by Hecker; however, this was eventually corrected and reduced back down to a 1% solution to reduce chemical irritation to the newborn's eyes. As neonatal conjunctivitis used to occur in around 10% of newborns and cause about half of all cases of blindness in Europe, the treatment is credited with saving the eyesight of millions.

In the 1980s, silver nitrate was replaced by erythromycin and tetracycline treatments, which are better tolerated by the eye and more effective against Chlamydia trachomatis in addition to N. gonorrhea. U.S. CDC now recommends a preventative approach focused on screening before pregnancy, in early pregnancy, and in the third trimester and/or delivery (for certain at-risk pregnant women).

== Notes ==
The works "Archiv für Gynäkologie" are freely available in the public domain.
