= Adolf Gusserow =

German gynecologist

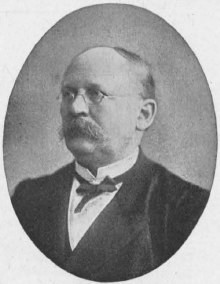
Adolf Ludwig Sigismund Gusserow

Adolf Ludwig Sigismund Gusserow (Berlin, 8 July 1836 – Berlin, 8 February 1906) was a German gynecologist who was a native of Berlin. He married Clara Oppenheim (1861–1944), a descendant of Berlin banker Joseph Mendelssohn.

Gusserow began his career as a lecturer of gynecological diseases and obstetrics in Berlin, and afterwards was a professor at the Universities of Utrecht, Zurich and Strasbourg. Later he returned to Berlin as director of the clinic of obstetrics and gynecology at the Berlin-Charité. Two of his better-known students and assistants were Alfred Dührssen (1862-1933) in Berlin, and Paul Zweifel (1848-1927) in Zurich.

In 1870 Gusserow was the first physician to describe a rare type of uterine cervical adenocarcinoma that is sometimes referred to as "adenoma malignum" or as a mucinous type of "minimal deviation adenocarcinoma" (mucinous MDA). It can be recognized by its "deceptively bland" histological appearance. Gusserow published his findings in a treatise titled Ueber Sarcoma des Uterus.

Among his better written efforts was Die Neubildungen des Uterus (Neoplasms of the uterus).

== Publications ==
- Zur Lehre vom Stoffwechsel des Foetus. Engelhardt, Leipzig, 1872
- Ueber Menstruation und Dysmenorrhoe. Breitkopf and Haertel, Leipzig, 1874
- Die Neubildungen des Uterus. Enke, Stuttgart, 1886 (Reprint 2007, VDM Verlag Dr. Müller, ISBN 3-8364-1464-3)
- Geburtshuelfe und Gynaekologie in Großbritannien - Ein Reisebericht. Engelhardt, Leipzig 1864 (in Google Books online)

== Literature ==
- Pagel J: Biographisches Lexikon hervorragender Ärzte des neunzehnten Jahrhunderts. Berlin, Vienna 1901, 660-661
- Nagel W: Adolf Gusserow (1836—1906). BJOG 9 (2005), 385-6, doi:10.1111/j.1471-0528.1906.tb09001.x
