= Heider FC =

German football club

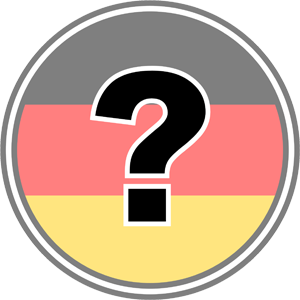
- Full name: Heider Fußball-Club von 1905
- Founded: 1905
- League: defunct
Home colours	Away colours

Heider FC was a German association football club from the city of Heide, Schleswig-Holstein.

== History ==
The team was established in 1905 as a separate football side out of Männer-Turnverein 1860 Heide. In 1914, they merged with Fußball-Club Holstein Heide to play as Heider Sportvereinigung before taking on the name Verein für Leibesübungen 05 Heide in 1919. VfL was reunited with parent side MTV in the 1930s and played as Verein für Leibesübungen 1860 Heide until sometime in the 40s when the club resumed its traditional identity as MTV 1860 Heide.

In its brief existence as an independent club, FC made a single appearance in the end round of the regional Norddeutscher (North German) championship, advancing to the quarterfinals where they were put out 0:5 by Holstein Kiel. Playing as VfL, the team made single season appearances on the senior local circuit, the Bezirksliga Schleswig-Holstein, in 1924–25 and 1927–28, but did not distinguish itself.
