= Paul Zweifel =

German gynecologist and physiologist

Paul Zweifel (30 June 1848 in Höngg, near Zürich, Switzerland – 13 August 1927 in Leipzig, Germany) was a German gynecologist and physiologist. In 1876 he proved that the fetus was metabolically active.

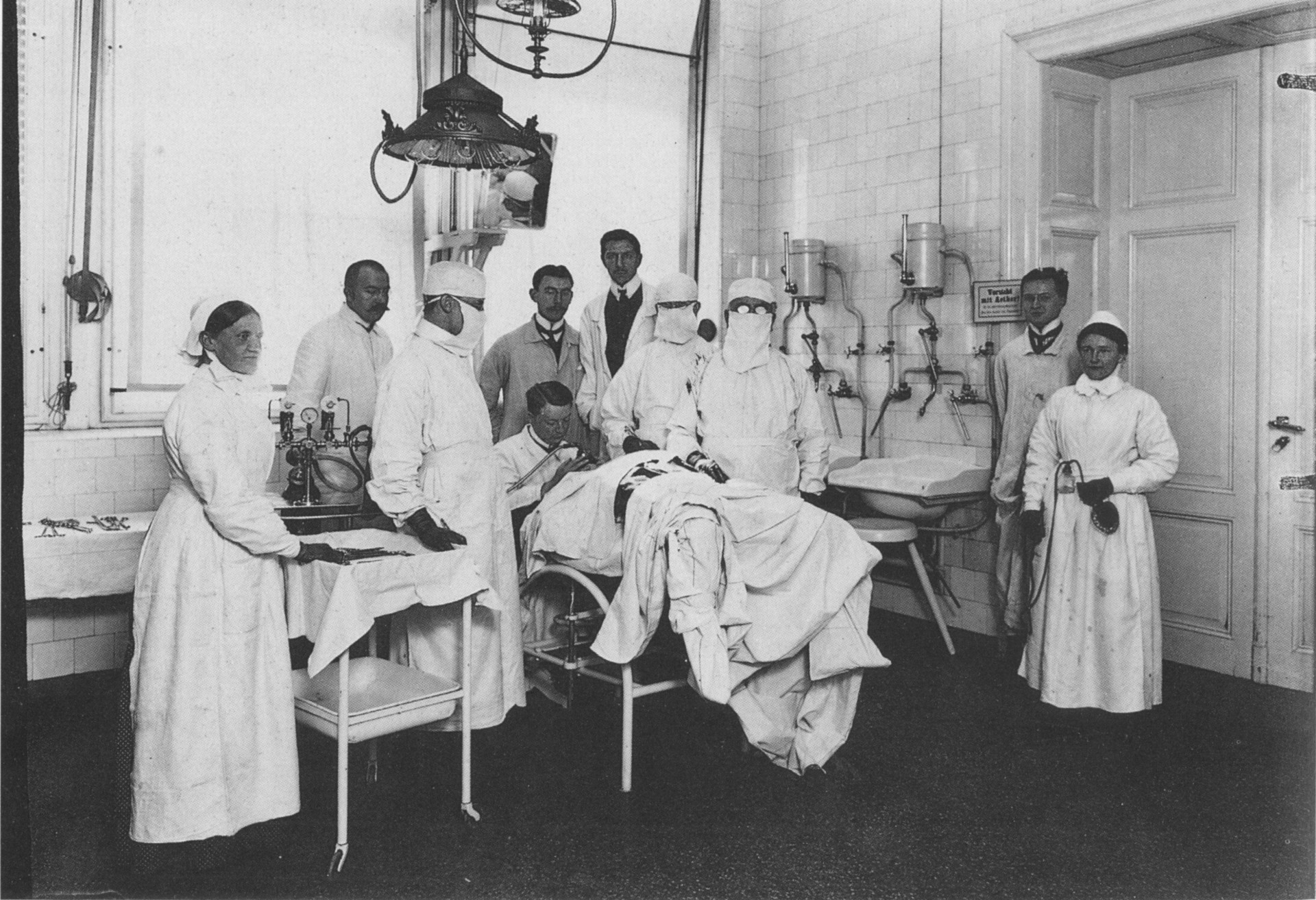
Zweifel and his operations team at the Frauenklinik Leipzig (1905).

== Biography ==
Zweifel was born in Switzerland; his father was a physician. He was educated at the University of Zürich (M.D. 1871), studying under Adolf Gusserow (1836-1906). In 1871, he received the venia legendi at the University of Strassburg, where he had already become an assistant in the gynecological institute. At Strassburg, he conducted studies on the physiology of the fetus and placenta in Felix Hoppe-Seyler's institute. In 1876 he was appointed professor of gynecology at the University of Erlangen. In 1887 he transferred to University of Leipzig, where he served as the Chief of Obstetrics and Gynecology until his retirement 35 years later (1921). He held the title Geheimer Medizinal-Rat.

In 1876, he became the first to demonstrate that the fetus in utero is metabolically active, consuming oxygen. This was a hotly debated question before Zweifel, and his discovery introduced the modern era of fetal physiology research. He also made extensive use of statistics to evaluate competing obstetrical procedures.

In 1931, a road in the Probstheida district of Leipzig was named Zweifelstraße in his honor. Also a building at the University of Erlangen bears his name.

== Works ==
Zweifel contributed over 100 monographs to medical journals. Among his many works may be mentioned:

- Über den Verdauungsapparat der Neugeborenen (Strasburg, 1874).
- Lehrbuch der Operativen Geburtshülfe (Stuttgart, 1881; appeared as Lehrbuch der Geburtshülfe, Stuttgart, 1887, 5th ed. 1901).
- Der Einfluss der Aerztlichen Thätigkeit auf die Bevölkerungsbewegung (Stuttgart, 1887).
- Die Symphyseotomie (Stuttgart 1893).
- Ätiologie, Prophylaxis und Therapie der Rachitis (Stuttgart, 1900).
- Ätiologie, Begriff und Prophylaxis des Kindbettfiebers (Leipzig, J.A. Barth, 1912).

== Bibliography ==
- Pagel, J.L., Biographisches Lexikon.
- Meyers Konversations-Lexikon.
- Brockhaus Konversations-Lexikon.
