= Credé's maneuver =

Technique used to void urine from the bladder or expel the placenta

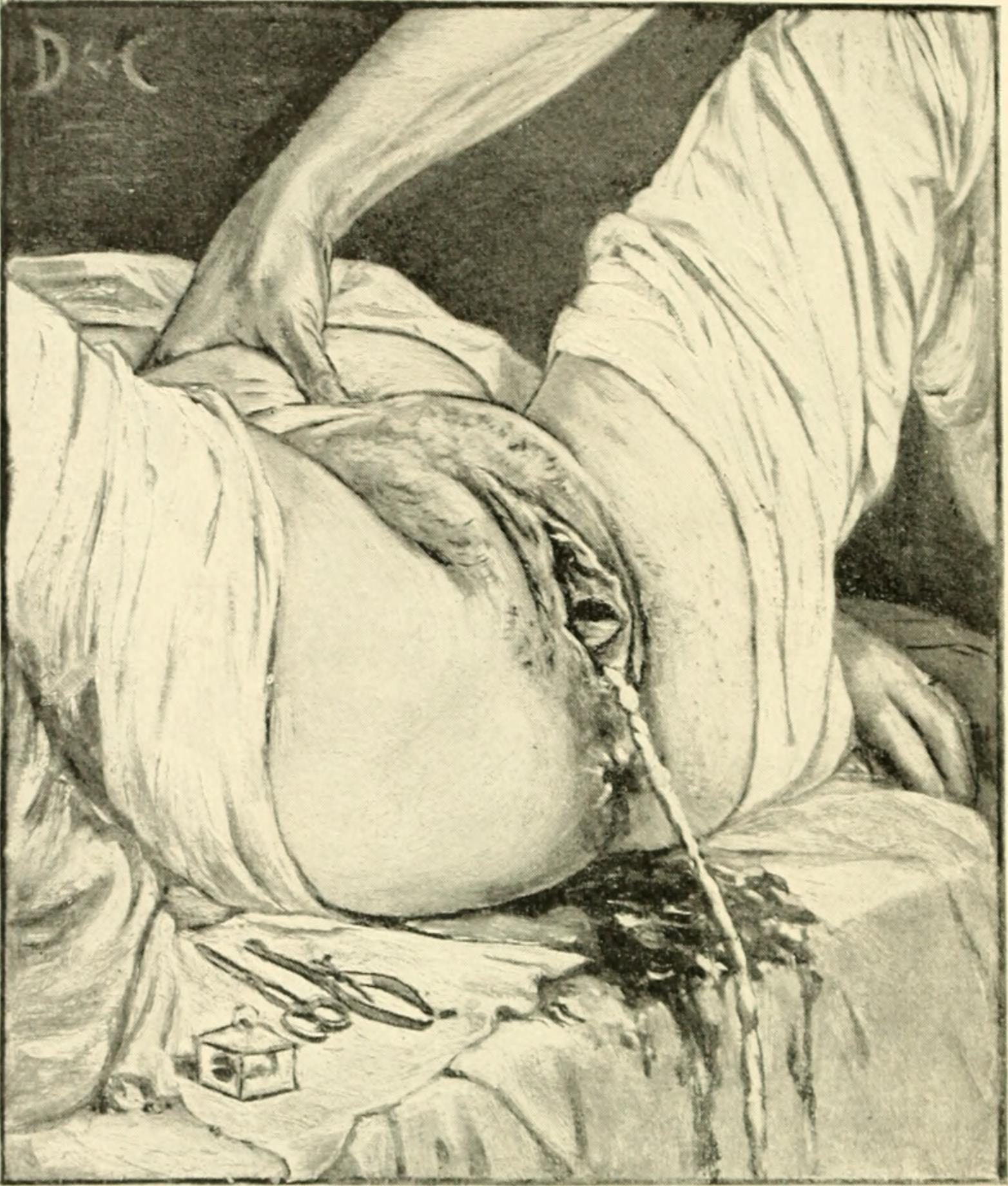

The Credé maneuver is a technique used to void urine from the bladder of an individual who, due to disease, cannot do so without aid. The Credé maneuver is executed by exerting manual pressure on the abdomen at the location of the bladder, just below the navel. Patients can learn to perform the maneuver on themselves as it is simple to do. The method is also used in obstetrics to aid the body in expelling the placenta after childbirth.
