= Osternienburg (Verwaltungsgemeinschaft) =

Municipality in Saxony-Anhalt, Germany

Coordinates: 51°48′N 12°02′E

Osternienburg was a Verwaltungsgemeinschaft ("collective municipality") in the Anhalt-Bitterfeld district, in Saxony-Anhalt, Germany. The seat of the Verwaltungsgemeinschaft was in Osternienburg. It was disbanded on 1 January 2010.

== Municipalities ==
The Verwaltungsgemeinschaft Osternienburg consisted of the following municipalities:

1. Chörau
2. Diebzig
3. Dornbock
4. Drosa
5. Elsnigk
6. Großpaschleben
7. Kleinpaschleben
8. Libbesdorf
9. Micheln
10. Osternienburg
11. Reppichau
12. Trinum
13. Wulfen
14. Zabitz
