= Nienburg (Verwaltungsgemeinschaft) =

Coordinates: 51°49′N 11°45′E

Nienburg (Saale) was a Verwaltungsgemeinschaft ("collective municipality") in the Salzlandkreis district, in Saxony-Anhalt, Germany. The seat of the Verwaltungsgemeinschaft was in Nienburg. It was disbanded on 1 January 2010.

The Verwaltungsgemeinschaft Nienburg (Saale) consisted of the following municipalities:

1. Baalberge
2. Biendorf
3. Cörmigk
4. Edlau
5. Gerbitz
6. Gerlebogk
7. Latdorf
8. Neugattersleben
9. Nienburg
10. Peißen
11. Pobzig
12. Poley
13. Preußlitz
14. Wedlitz
15. Wiendorf
16. Wohlsdorf
