= Wohlsdorf =

- Ortsteil of Bernburg
- Interactive map of Wohlsdorf
- Location within Germany Location within Saxony-Anhalt
- Coordinates: 51°46′N 11°52′E
- Country: Germany
- State: Saxony-Anhalt
- District: Salzlandkreis
- Town: Bernburg

Area
  - Total: 7.48 km^{2} (2.89 sq mi)
- Elevation: 71 m (233 ft)

Population (2020-12-31)
  - Total: 416
  - Density: 55.6/km^{2} (144/sq mi)
- Time zone: UTC+01:00 (CET)
  - Summer (DST): UTC+02:00 (CEST)
- Postal codes: 06408
- Dialling codes: 034722

Wohlsdorf (German pronunciation: [ˈvoːlsˌdɔʁf]) is an Ortschaft (municipal division) of the town of Bernburg in Salzlandkreis, Saxony-Anhalt, Germany.

== History ==
Wohlsdorf was first mentioned as a village 10 kilometres (6.2 mi) east of Bernburg in 986. It later became a municipality in the Salzlandkreis district and, in 2005, the community belonged to the historic collective municipality of Nienburg. When Nienburg was disbanded on 1 January 2010, it was incorporated into Bernburg, along with the communities of Baalberge, Biendorf, Gröna, Peißen, Poley, and Preußlitz.

== Geography ==
Included in Wohlsdorf is the village of Crüchern, which was also formerly a separate district. Much of the surrounding area is gently rolling farmland, broken up only by about 114 square kilometres (44 mi^{2}) of woods dividing Crüchern from Wohlsdorf. The river Ziethe forms a border between the Wohlsdorf subdistrict and the village of Mölz, a sub-district of Kleinpaschleben. The Ziethe flows first southwest then southeast along the border of the woods that stretch alongside Crüchern, forming a border between farmland and village of Wohlsdorf. It bends again southeasterly and around the western edge of Biendorf, another village-sub-district of Bradenburg on the southern border of Wohlsdorf.

== Transportation ==
1.32 kilometres (0.82 mi) north of the village of Crüchern, Landesstraße 149 (L149) meets and becomes the continuation of federal road Bundesstraße 185 (B185) as it meets Bundesstraße 6n (B6n). Both highways run east towards Köthen, but B185 runs through Kleinpaschleben, Trinum, Großpaschleben, and Köthen while B6n runs parallel to B185, avoiding cities and towns by cutting through farmland and curving south around the city of Köthen to merge into north-south B183.

West of L149, B185 continues for 14 kilometres (8.7 mi) towards Bernburg, passing the Latdorf/Dröbel landfill between Latdorf and Dröbel until it meets international European route E49 and becomes B6.

Much of the traffic in Wohlsdorf is by car, but outside the subdistrict to the south in Biendorf are train and bus stations.

== Demography ==
Historical population

Year	Pop.	±% p.a.
1964	807	—
1971	749	−1.06%
1981	646	−1.47%
1989	598	−0.96%
1990	578	−3.34%
1991	571	−1.21%
1992	561	−1.75%
1993	562	+0.18%
1994	557	−0.89%
1995	571	+2.51%
1996	566	−0.88%
1997	576	+1.77%
1998	575	−0.17%
1999	569	−1.04%
2000	574	+0.88%
2001	573	−0.17%

Year	Pop.	±% p.a.
2002	551	−3.84%
2003	535	−2.90%
2004	523	−2.24%
2005	519	−0.76%
2006	519	+0.00%
2007	516	−0.58%
2008	505	−2.13%
2009	477	−5.54%
2010	476	−0.21%
2011	469	−1.47%
2012	459	−2.13%
2013	445	−3.05%
2014	426	−4.27%
2015	439	+3.05%
2016	449	+2.28%
2020	416	−1.89%
