= Ziethe =

River in Germany

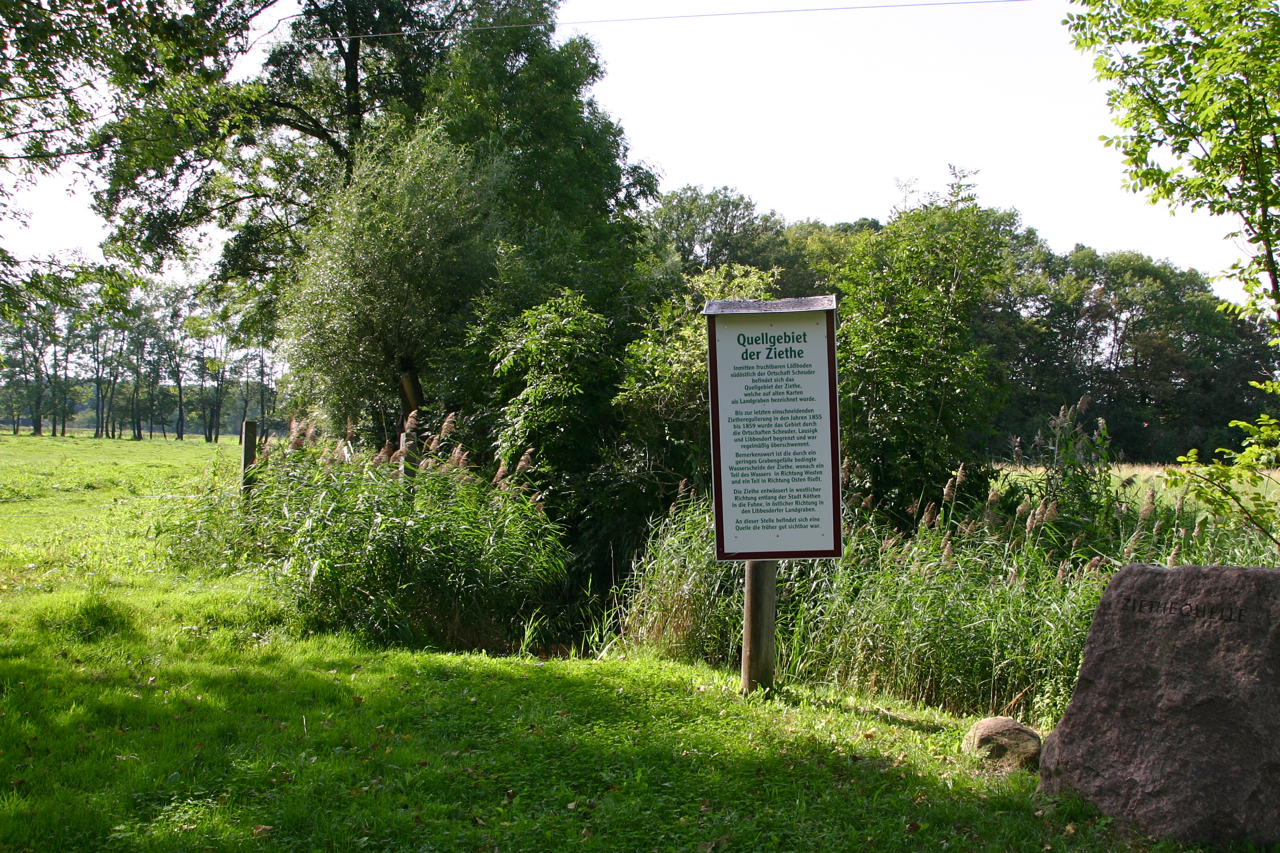

Location
- Country: Germany
- State: Saxony-Anhalt

Physical characteristics
- Mouth
  - location: Fuhne
  - coordinates: 51.7417°N 11.8047°E

Basin features
- Progression: Fuhne→ Saale→ Elbe→ North Sea

Ziethe is a river of Saxony-Anhalt, Germany. It flows into the Fuhne near Preußlitz.

== Cities and towns ==
- Scheuder
- Libbesdorf
- Merzien
- Zehringen
- Köthen (Anhalt)
- Großpaschleben
- Zabitz
- Trinum
- Kleinpaschleben
- Crüchern
- Wohlsdorf
- Biendorf
- Plömnitz

== See also ==
- List of rivers of Saxony-Anhalt
