= Poley, Germany =

Poley
- Stadtteil of Bernburg
- Interactive map of Poley
- Location within Germany Location within Saxony-Anhalt
- Coordinates: 51°46′N 11°49′E
- Country: Germany
- State: Saxony-Anhalt
- District: Salzlandkreis
- Town: Bernburg

Area
  - Total: 9.9 km^{2} (3.8 sq mi)
- Elevation: 80 m (260 ft)

Population (2006-12-31)
  - Total: 656
  - Density: 66/km^{2} (170/sq mi)
- Time zone: UTC+01:00 (CET)
  - Summer (DST): UTC+02:00 (CEST)
- Postal codes: 06408
- Dialling codes: 03471

Poley (German pronunciation: [ˈpoːlaɪ]) is a village and a former municipality in the district of Salzlandkreis, in Saxony-Anhalt, Germany. Since 1 January 2010, it has been part of the town of Bernburg.

== History ==
As of January 1, 2005, the municipality of Poley belonged to the administrative community of Nienburg (Saale). On January 1, 2010, the previously independent municipality was incorporated into the city of Bernburg (Saale) together with the municipalities of Baalberge, Biendorf, Gröna, Peißen, Preußlitz and Wohlsdorf.
