= Poley =

Poley may refer to:

== People ==
- Thomas Poley (died c. 1563), Tudor-era English politician
- Edmund Poley (1544–1613), member of the Parliament of England for Bodmin, 1572–1581, for Knaresborough, 1584 and for Clitheroe, 1586
- Sir Edmund Poley (1619–1671), member of the Parliament of England for Bury St Edmunds, 1661–1671
- Robert Poley (fl. 1568– aft. 1602), English double agent
- Robert Poley (English MP), (c.1600-1627) English politician
- Ted Poley (born 1964), American rock singer and drummer

== Places ==
- Poley, Germany, a municipality in Saxony-Anhalt, Germany
- Poley, Louisiana, U.S.
- Poley Mountain, New Brunswick, Canada
- Aguilar de la Frontera, Andalucia, Spain, called Poley during the Moorish suzerainty

== See also ==
- Polis, plural poleis (sometimes pronounced poley), the Greek word for city state
