= Eike of Repgow =

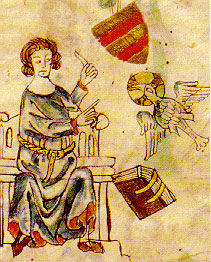
Depiction in the Oldenburg Sachsenspiegel (14th century)

Eike of Repgow (German: Eike von Repgow, also von Repkow, von Repko, von Repchow or von Repchau; c. 1180 – c. 1233) was a medieval German administrator who compiled the Sachsenspiegel code of law in the 13th century.

== Life ==
Little is known about Eike of Repgow, but he is mentioned in several documents dating from the period between 1209 and 1233. He was a scion of the Eastphalian gentry and it is thought that his family were vassals of the Magdeburg archbishops. His ancestors had moved to the Gau of Serimunt, south of Magdeburg, in the 12th century, where they acquired land in the village of Reppichau (in present-day Saxony-Anhalt). Other members of the family are mentioned earlier in 1156 and 1159. From his mention in court proceedings in 1209 it is inferred that he was born around 1180. Lack of mentions after 1233 suggests that he died shortly after that.

From the prologue to the Sachsenspiegel it is clear that Eike could read Latin as well as German. It is not actually known if he could write, since it was quite common, at the time, to employ scribes. He was versed both in Canon and Roman law; so it is thought that he was educated at a cathedral school, possibly in Halberstadt, or more likely at Magdeburg under Archbishop Wichmann von Seeburg.

It is clear that he was a respected personage, but his precise place in the feudal hierarchy is not known with certainty, since he is sometimes listed among the free nobles and sometimes among the bondsmen (Dienstmannen). Eike of Repgow may have been a bondsman of Count Henry I of Anhalt or of Count Hoyer of Falkenstein, who then served as Vogt of Quedlinburg Abbey. Nevertheless, he was probably a free noble, one of the so-called schöffenbar freie, which entitled him to sit in the Thing (baron's court). One theory is that he was of noble birth, but like many others, became a ministerialis or bondsman, while retaining his noble status.

== Works ==
=== Sachsenspiegel ===
Eike of Repgow translated the Sachsenspiegel at the behest of Count Hoyer of Falkenstein between 1220 and 1233. It was intended by its compiler to document existing, customary law, not to create new law. The work is of great significance not only as the first German legal code but also as one of the first major works of Middle Low German prose. As the author writes in the verse prologue of the Sachsenspiegel, he first wrote it in Latin and later, with some reluctance, at the wishes of Count Hoyer of Falkenstein, translated it into German.

The Latin version of the first part, on Landrecht (common law), has been lost, but the second part, on Lehensrecht (feudal law) was, as is now believed, preserved. This is the Vetus auctor de beneficiis, which is written in verse. There was a debate as to whether this was the Latin original of the part of the Sachsenspiegel on feudal law or a later translation of it into Latin, and for some time the latter view prevailed. However, the current consensus is that the Vetus auctor de beneficiis is indeed the Latin original of the feudal law section of the Sachsenspiegel.

Where the original was compiled is unclear. It was thought to have been written in Quedlinburg or at Falkenstein Castle in the Harz Mountains, but Peter Landau, an expert in medieval canon law recently suggested that it may have been written at the Cistercian abbey of Altzelle (now Altzella).

=== Sächsische Weltchronik ===
Another work, the Sächsische Weltchronik has been dated about 1260 and also been attributed to Eike, but this is now thought unlikely.

== Commemoration ==
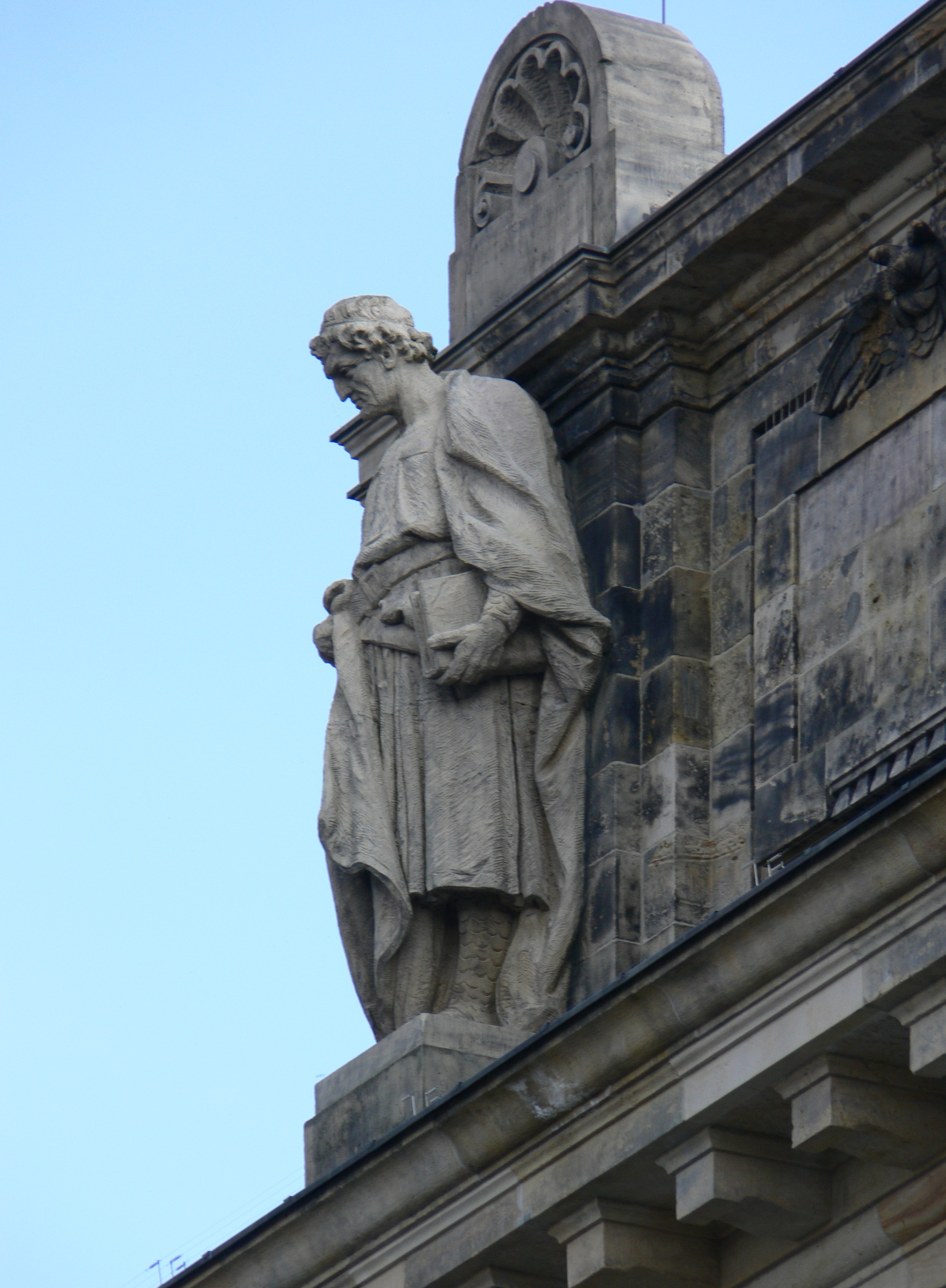
Statue of Eike of Repgow at the Reich Court building in Leipzig

There are monuments to Eike of Repgow in Magdeburg, Dessau, Reppichau and Halberstadt and at Falkenstein Castle in the Harz Mountains. There is a square named after him in Berlin, and there is an open-air museum devoted to him and the Sachsenspiegel in his village of Reppichau. There are also schools named after Eike of Repgow in Halberstadt and Magdeburg.

The Eike of Repgow prize, which comes with a statuette of Eike, a certificate, and 5,000 euros, is awarded jointly by awarded annually by the city of Magdeburg and the Otto von Guericke University of Magdeburg for academic work of a historical or legal nature.

== Famous words ==
The origin of the modern German saying "Wer zuerst kommt, mahlt zuerst" ("first come, first served", literally he who comes first, grinds first) can be traced to Eike of Repgow, who wrote (in the Sachsenspiegel) Die ok irst to der molen kumt, die sal erst malen (in modern English: He who comes to the mill first shall grind first).

== Additional sources ==
- Hiram Kümper (2005). "Repgow, Eike von". In Bautz, Traugott (ed.). Biographisch-Bibliographisches Kirchenlexikon (BBKL) (in German). Vol. 24. Nordhausen: Bautz. cols. 1208–1213. ISBN 3-88309-247-9.
- Article on Eike of Repgow by the radio station MDR (in German)
