= Peißen =

Peißen or Peissen may refer to the following places in Germany:

- Peißen, Saalekreis, a municipality in the Saalekreis district, Saxony-Anhalt
- Peißen, Salzland, a municipality in the Salzland district, Saxony-Anhalt
- Peissen, a municipality in the district of Steinburg, Schleswig-Holstein
