= August Carl Eduard Baldamus =

German ornithologist

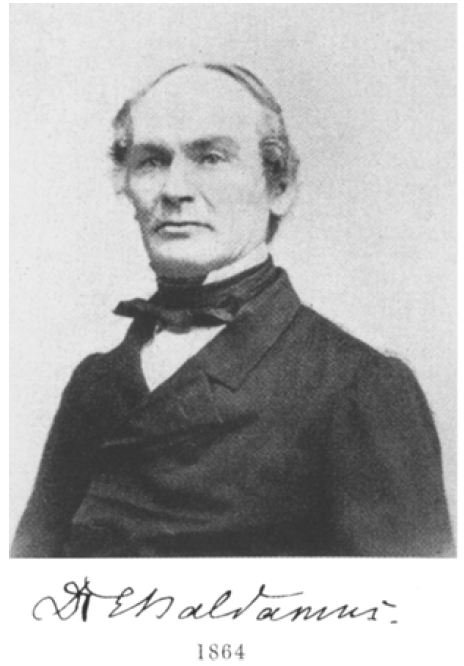
Baldamus in 1864

August Carl Eduard Baldamus (April 18, 1812 – October 30, 1893) was a German ornithologist who founded the German Ornithologists' Society.

== Life ==
Baldamus was born in Giersleben, Saxony-Anhalt. He studied theology at the University of Berlin. In 1859 he became professor at the Gymnasium in Köthen where he met Carl Andreas Naumann and his brother Johann Friedrich Naumann, both ornithologists.

Baldamus was the founder of the Deutsche Ornithologen-Gesellschaft (German Ornithologists' Society) and published the ornithological journal Naumannia between 1849 and 1858.

In 1849 he became Pastor in Diebzig, in 1859 moving to the same office in Osternienburg. He retired to Coburg in 1870.

He died in Coburg.

== Works ==
- Johann Andreas Naumann u. Johann Friedrich Naumann: Naturgeschichte der Vögel Deutschlands. Nach eigenen Erfahrungen entworfen. Fleischer, Leipzig 1822–1866, Band 1–13 Naturgeschichte der Vogel Deutschlands continuation finished in 1860 by August Carl Eduard Baldamus and Wilhelm Blasius.
- Vogel-Märchen. Dresden, Schöufelb, 1876.
- Die Federviehzucht vom wirthschaftlichen Standpunkte. Hühner, Enten, Gänse.Dresden, G. Schönfeld 1876–78
- Das Leben der europäischen Kuckucke : nebst Beiträgen zur Lebenskunde der übrigen parasitischen Kuckucke und Stärlinge Berlin :Verlag von Paul Parey,1892.
