= Könnern =

- Town
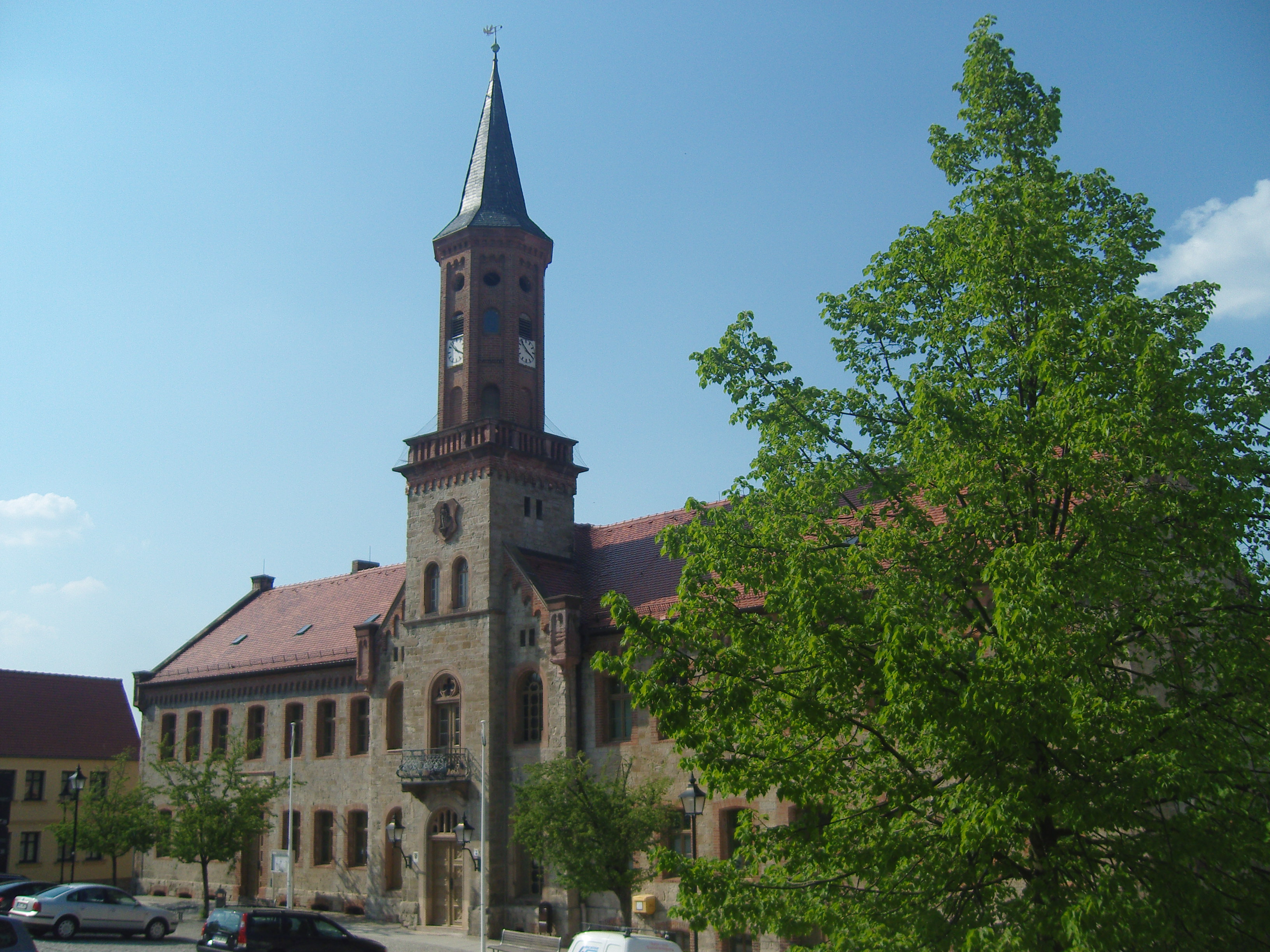
- Town hall

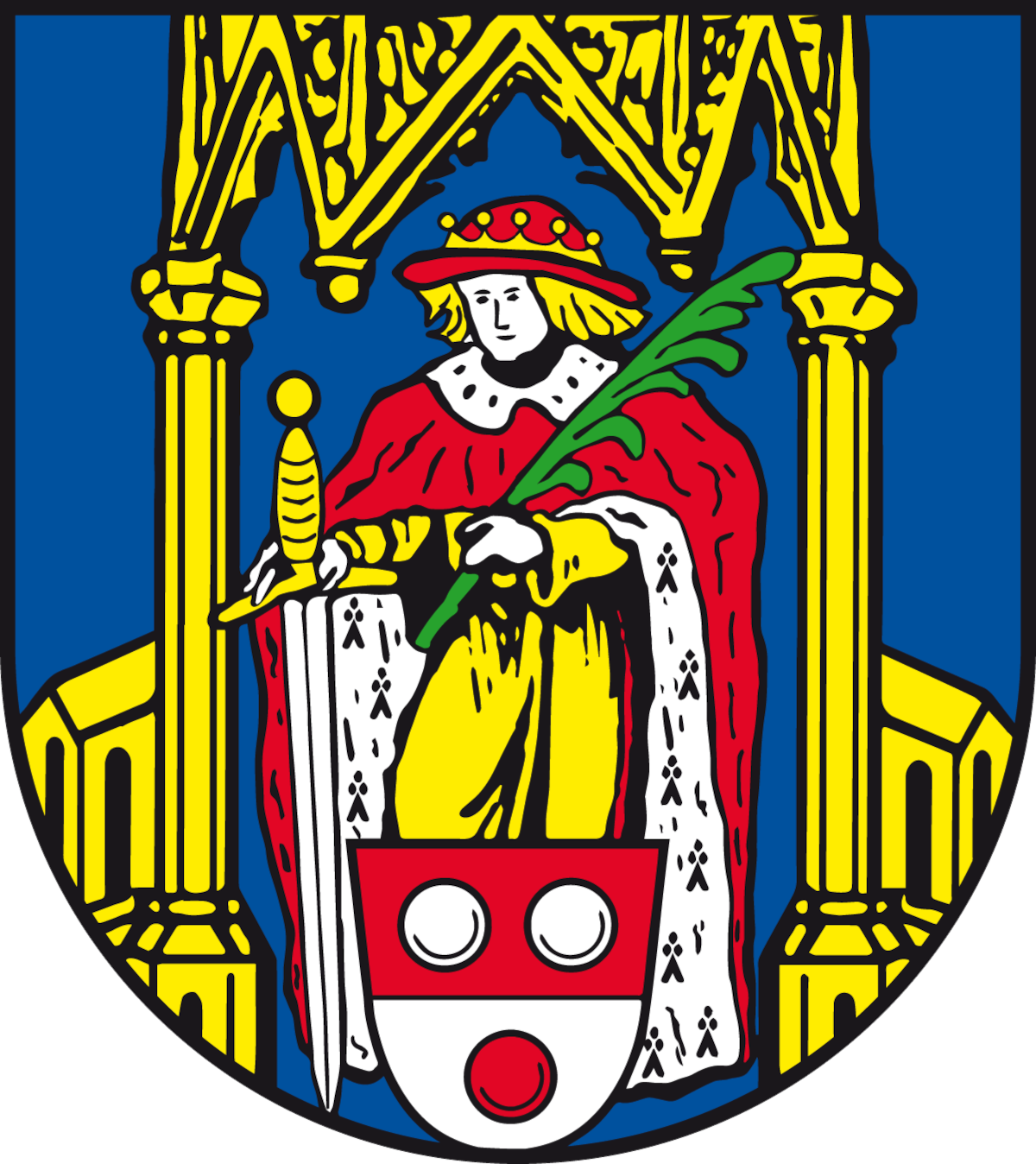
- Coat of arms

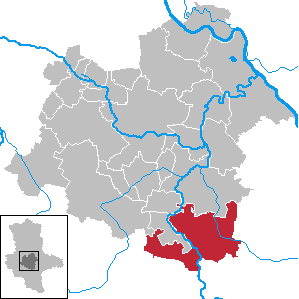
- Location of Könnern within Salzlandkreis district
- Interactive map of Könnern
- Location within Germany Location within Saxony-Anhalt
- Coordinates: 51°40′11″N 11°46′15″E
- Country: Germany
- State: Saxony-Anhalt
- District: Salzlandkreis

Government
  - Mayor (2022–29): Martin Zbyszewski (SPD)

Area
  - Total: 125.28 km^{2} (48.37 sq mi)
- Elevation: 121 m (397 ft)

Population (2025-12-31)
  - Total: 7,804
  - Density: 62.29/km^{2} (161.3/sq mi)
- Time zone: UTC+01:00 (CET)
  - Summer (DST): UTC+02:00 (CEST)
- Postal codes: 06420
- Dialling codes: 034691
- Vehicle registration: SLK
- Website: www.stadt-koennern.de

Könnern (German pronunciation: [ˈkœnɐn]) is a town in the district of Salzlandkreis, in Saxony-Anhalt, Germany. It is situated on the right bank of the river Saale, approx. 15 km south of Bernburg, and 25 km northwest of Halle (Saale).

== Geography ==
The town Könnern consists of Könnern proper and ten Ortschaften or municipal divisions. These Ortschaften are former municipalities, absorbed into Könnern between 2003 and 2010:

- Beesenlaublingen
- Belleben
- Cörmigk
- Edlau
- Gerlebogk
- Golbitz
- Lebendorf
- Strenznaundorf
- Wiendorf
- Zickeritz
