= Osternienburg station =

Railway station in Saxony-Anhalt, Germany

Osternienburg
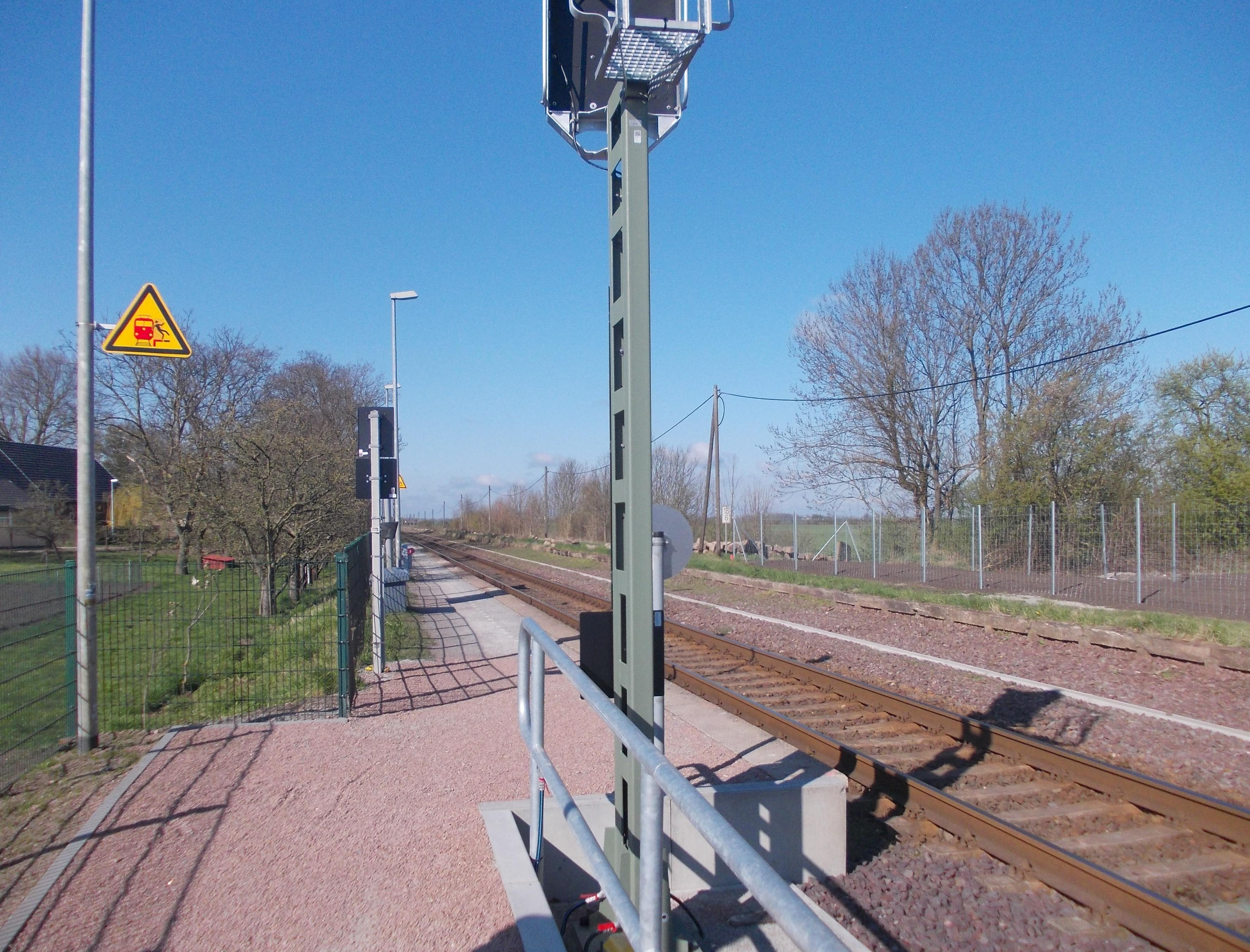
- 2015

General information
- Location: Dessauer Straße; 06386 Osternienburg; Saxony-Anhalt; Germany
- Coordinates: 51.7835°N 12.0307°E
- System: Hp
- Owner: DB Netz
- Operator: DB Station&Service
- Lines: Dessau–Köthen railway (KBS 334)
- Platforms: 1 side platform
- Tracks: 1

Construction
- Parking: no
- Cycle facilities: no
- Accessible: yes

Other information
- Station code: 4797
- DS100 code: LOST
- IBNR: 8012570
- Category: 6
- Fare zone: MDV: 273 (rail only)
- Website: www.bahnhof.de

History
- Closed: 11 December 2022
Location
- Location within Saxony-Anhalt Location within Germany Location within Europe

Osternienburg station was a railway station in the municipality of Osternienburg, located in the Anhalt-Bitterfeld district in Saxony-Anhalt, Germany. It was closed with the December 2022 timetable change because of low ridership.
