= Nienburg =

Nienburg, meaning "new castle", may refer to the following locations in Germany:

- Nienburg (district), Lower Saxony
  - Nienburg, Lower Saxony
    - Nienburg station
  - Nienburg II – Schaumburg, a German parliament constituency
- Nienburg, Saxony-Anhalt
  - Nienburg Abbey, a Benedictine monastery
  - Nienburg (Verwaltungsgemeinschaft), a collective municipality, disbanded in 2010
