= Jean Cabanis =

German ornithologist (1816–1906)

Jean Louis Cabanis
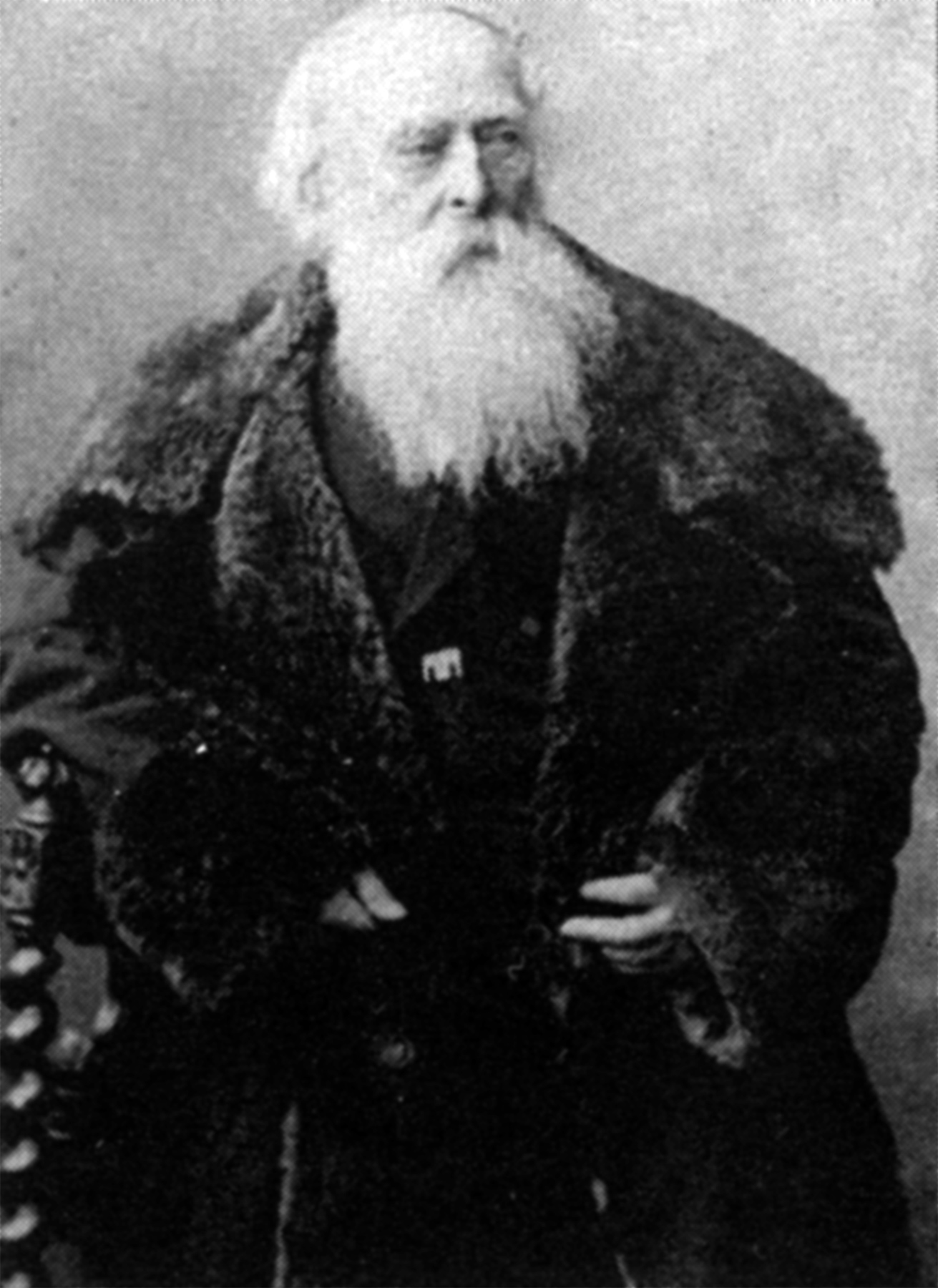
- Born: 8 March 1816; Berlin, Germany
- Died: 20 February 1906 (aged 89); Friedrichshagen, Germany
- Known for: Journal of Ornithology (1853)
- Scientific career
- Fields: Ornithology
- Author abbrev. (zoology): Cabanis

Jean Louis Cabanis (8 March 1816 – 20 February 1906) was a German ornithologist. He worked at the bird collections of the Natural History Museum in Berlin becoming its first curator of birds in 1850. He founded the Journal für Ornithologie in 1853.

== Biography ==
Cabanis was born in Berlin to an old Huguenot family who had moved from France. His father Benoit-Jean (1774–1838) and mother Maria Luise (1783–1849) both came from families that were in the textile industry. Little is known of his early life. He studied at the University of Berlin from 1835 to 1839, and then travelled to North America, working as a museum assistant in Carolina. He returned in 1841 with a large natural history collection. He was assistant at the Natural History Museum of Berlin (which was at the time the Berlin University Museum) and in 1850 he became the curator of birds, taking over from Martin Lichtenstein. Charles Lucien Bonaparte had offered him a position at the Jardin des Plantes but Cabanis turned it down. He founded the Journal für Ornithologie in 1853, editing it for the next forty-one years, when he was succeeded by his son-in-law Anton Reichenow. Cabanis considered the journal Naumannia, the official organ of the Deutsche Ornithologen-Gesellschaft, edited by Eduard Baldamus, as too narrow in its geographic scope and its German centricity.

Cabanis married Jeanne daughter of Ambrosius Rinaldi in Berlin in 1849. They had six sons and three daughters. He died in Friedrichshagen.

A number of birds are named after him, including Cabanis's bunting Emberiza cabanisi, Cabanis's spinetail Synallaxis cabanisi, azure-rumped tanager Poecilostreptus cabanisi and Cabanis's greenbul Phyllastrephus cabanisi.
