= Robert J. Rankin =

American fighter ace (1918–2013)

Robert James Rankin
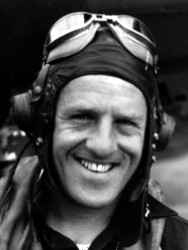
- Nickname: "Shorty"
- Born: October 23, 1918; Washington, D.C., US
- Died: March 14, 2013 (aged 94) Jensen Beach, Florida, US
- Allegiance: United States
- Branch: United States Army Air Corps; United States Army Air Forces; United States Air Force
- Service years: 1941–1973
- Rank: Colonel
- Conflicts: World War II; Korean War; Vietnam War
- Awards: Distinguished Service Cross; Legion of Merit; Distinguished Flying Cross (4); Bronze Star Medal (2); Air Medal (5)

Robert James Rankin (October 23, 1918 – March 14, 2013) was a United States Air Force colonel. During World War II, he became a flying ace with the United States Army Air Forces credited with 10 aerial victories, including five in a single day, for which he was awarded the Distinguished Service Cross.

== Early life and service ==
Robert J. Rankin was born on October 23, 1918, in Washington, D.C. Rankin enlisted into the United States Army Air Corps on March 6, 1941. On July 15, 1942, he became an aviation cadet in the newly formed Army Air Forces, graduating from flight training at Luke Field, Glendale, Arizona, on April 11, 1943.

== World War II ace ==
In August, Second Lieutenant Rankin was assigned to the 61st Fighter Squadron, 56th Fighter Group, Eight Air Force, at RAF Halesworth in Suffolk, England. On February 6, 1944, Rankin claimed his first aerial victory, shooting down a German Messerschmitt Bf 109 over Paris, France.

On March 15, First Lieutenant Rankin shot down two more Bf 109s and damaged a Focke-Wulf Fw 190 over Germany. Rankin claimed his fourth victory on March 29 near Nienburg. In April, the squadron moved to RAF Boxted in Essex, England.

First Lieutenant Rankin would finally claim ace status on May 12, 1944. Rankin was leading a flight of P-47 Thunderbolts ahead of a bomber force in Germany. While near Marburg, the flight engaged several dozen Bf 109s, and Rankin shot three of them out of the air. Upon downing the third one, his group commander, Lieutenant Colonel Hubert Zemke, radioed for help as German planes were on his tail. Rankin and his wingmen flew to Zemke's position, where Rankin shot down two more planes and damaged two others.

First Lieutenant Rankin became the first member of the 56th Fighter Group and first P-47 pilot to claim "ace in a day." He was also awarded the Distinguished Service Cross for his actions that day. On June 7, 1944, Rankin claimed his 10th and final victory of the war.

== Post-war career and life ==
After World War II, Rankin transferred to the United States Air Force. He flew more combat missions with the 4th Fighter Interceptor Wing during the Korean War. Rankin was promoted to colonel in 1963, later taking part in the Vietnam War. He retired from the Air Force on April 1, 1973.

On March 14, 2013, Robert J. Rankin died in his winter home in Jensen Beach, Florida. His body was subsequently cremated.

== Aerial victory credits ==
Chronicle of aerial victories
Date	#	Type	Location	Aircraft flown	Unit Assigned
February 06, 1944	1	Messerschmitt Bf 109	Paris, France	Republic P-47D Thunderbolt	61 FS, 56 FG
March 15, 1944	2	Bf 109	Dümmer Lake, Germany	P-47D	61 FS, 56 FG
March 29, 1944	1	Bf 109	Nienburg, Germany	P-47D	61 FS, 56 FG
May 12, 1944	5	Bf 109	Marburg, Germany & Koblenz, Germany	P-47D	61 FS, 56 FG
June 07, 1944	1	Bf 109	Senlis, France	P-47D	61 FS, 56 FG

SOURCES: Air Force Historical Study 85: USAF Credits for the Destruction of Enemy Aircraft, World War II

== Awards and decorations ==
=== Distinguished Service Cross ===
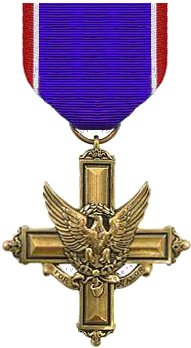

Citation:

The President of the United States of America, authorized by Act of Congress July 9, 1918, takes pleasure in presenting the Distinguished Service Cross to First Lieutenant (Air Corps) Robert James Rankin (ASN: 0-743089), United States Army Air Forces, for extraordinary heroism in connection with military operations against an armed enemy while serving as Pilot of a P-47 Fighter Airplane in the 61st Fighter Squadron, 56th Fighter Group, EIGHTH Air Force, in action against the enemy on 12 May 1944. On this date Lieutenant Rankin led a flight of fighters on a sweep ahead of bombers en route to targets deep in Germany. In the vicinity of Marburg, Germany, Lieutenant Rankin without hesitation engaged a vastly superior force of enemy fighters and destroyed two of them. While regaining altitude he saw another enemy fighter and destroyed it. Hearing his Group Commander, who was several miles away, calling for help, Lieutenant Rankin, with his wingmen, flew to the assistance of the Group Commander and found him in contact with a large number of enemy fighters. The three attacked despite the overwhelming odds facing them and the fact that other enemy fighters were in position above them. Lieutenant Rankin at this time by exceptionally courageous flying and skillful gunnery destroyed two more enemy fighters. He then regained altitude and engaged two more enemy fighters, damaging them both. By this outstanding heroism and his determination to destroy the enemy, Lieutenant Rankin rendered outstanding and valorous service to our nation.

=== Commendations ===
Colonel Rankin has been awarded the following throughout his military career:

Badge	U.S. Air Force Command Pilot Badge		
1st row	Distinguished Service Cross		
2nd row	Legion of Merit	Distinguished Flying Cross with 3 bronze Oak leaf clusters (4 awards)	Bronze Star with 1 bronze Oak leaf cluster (2 awards)
3rd row	Air Medal with 4 bronze Oak leaf clusters (5 awards)	Air Force Commendation Medal with 1 bronze Oak leaf cluster (2 awards)	Army Commendation Medal
4th row	Presidential Unit Citation	Air Force Outstanding Unit Award with 1 bronze Oak leaf cluster	American Defense Service Medal
5th row	American Campaign Medal	European-African-Middle Eastern Campaign Medal with 1 silver Campaign star (5 stars total)	World War II Victory Medal
6th row	National Defense Service Medal with 1 Service star	Korean Service Medal with 1 Campaign Medal	Air Force Longevity Service Award with 1 silver and 1 bronze Oak leaf clusters (7 awards)
7th row	Republic of Korea Presidential Unit Citation	United Nations Korea Medal	Korean War Service Medal
