= Herrman S. Saroni =

American songwriter

Herrman S. Saroni (February 1824 – August 29, 1900) was a German-born American composer, author, and publisher.

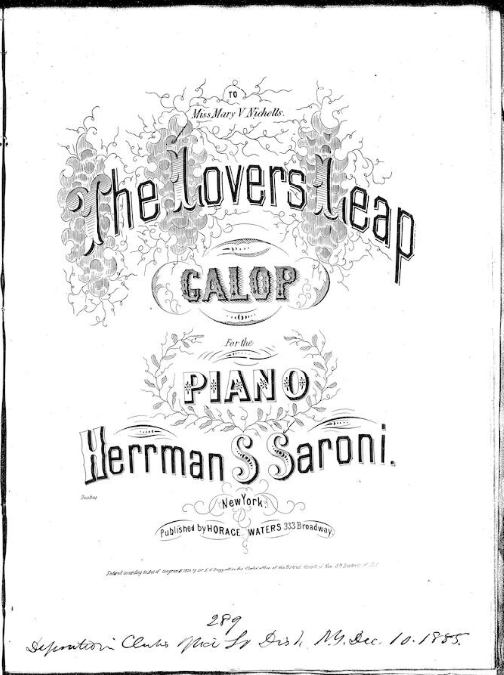
Title page of Saroni's 1855 work "The Lover's Leap Galop" from the Library of Congress.

== Biography ==
Saroni was born in Bernburg, Kingdom of Prussia, and referred to himself as a student of Mendelssohn. However, in a biography published during his lifetime, he was said to have studied under Friedrich Schneider.

In 1844 he applied for naturalization in New York City, where he later edited Saroni's Musical Times between 1849 and 1851. He organized a successful series of chamber music recitals during those years, featuring performers such as Theodore Eisfeld, Julia Northall, and Otto Dresel. Through critical writing and translating, he helped to spread German pedagogical approaches to American music education and appreciation. Despite the resulting "vogue of Mendelssohn in America", Saroni's influence remained obscure and only vaguely identifiable in its development for many years.

After 1851 he moved to Georgia, where he founded the Columbus Symphony Orchestra (1855). He later lived in Alabama, but eventually settled in Marietta, Ohio, where he taught piano at Marietta College. He died there in 1900. His wife died the following year, on September 16, 1901. Her obituary mentions four granddaughters: three in Marietta (Mrs. W. B. Gaitree, Miss Small, and Miss Kittie Small) and a fourth in Knoxville, Tennessee.

A “Brief Account of His Life and Work” in the August 30, 1900, Marietta Daily Leader, mentioned that he “made and lost several large fortunes” in America, “but in his later years he was in comfortable circumstances.” “Those who knew him best, knew him as a kind-hearted, well-educated and refined man.” He died in Marietta, Ohio.

== Music ==
Saroni composed parlor songs in English. These songs "demonstrate a shift away from bel canto traditions towards a lied-influenced style in this genre."

He also composed light piano pieces, two operettas, The Twin Sisters (1860) and Lily-Bell, the Culprit Fay (1868), and a Centennial Ode (1888).

== Inventions ==
Saroni is well known for his music. The Library of Congress holds many of his works. Grace D. Yerbury ascribes an American school of music to him in her 1971 book America in Song: from Early Times to About 1850 and David F. Urrows credits him with writing the first operetta in America in his 2008 article “Herrman S. Saroni and the first American Operetta” in the Bulletin of the Society of American Music. However, Saroni’s many inventions went virtually unnoticed until Daniel A. Bellware detailed them in the 2018 article “The Musical and Mechanical Genius of Herrman S. Saroni” in Muscogiana, the most complete biography of the musician/inventor to date.

Many of Saroni’s inventions were related to the use of “petroleum vapors” or what is commonly called gasoline in place of heavier and more expensive coal. Starting just after the American Civil War, Saroni began dabbling in uses for that fuel. He went into business selling petroleum vapor stoves in the Augusta, Georgia in 1866. He converted a coal-powered steamboat to gasoline power and demonstrated it on the Ohio River between Louisville and Cincinnati in 1867. Saroni lit the streets of St. Paul, Minnesota with petroleum vapor lights in 1878 and ran the first automobile through the streets of that city in 1879. He obtained at least seventeen patents between 1866 and 1892 in the United States and Canada. Most of the patents involved uses for gasoline but a few were musical.

== Writings ==
- "The Power of Music," Union Magazine of Literature and Art, July 1848
- Saroni's Musical Times, editor, 1849-1851
- The Musical Vade Mecum, 1852
- English translation of Theory and Practice of Musical Composition by Adolph Berhard Marx (1852)

== Music ==
Larger works

- Centennial Ode (1888)
- Lily-Bell, the Culprit Fay, operetta (John Church Co.), 1868
- The Twin Sisters, operetta (Oliver Ditson), 1860

Piano music

- The Atlantic: Grande Valse Brilliante (Firth, Hall & Pond), 1847
- Autumn: Grand Waltz(Firth, Hall & Pond), 1847
- La Belle Georgianne: Grand Waltz (Horace Waters), 1855
- Bohemian Grand March (John F. Nunns), c. 1845
- Comorn Grand March (Samuel C. Jollie), 1850
- The Ivy Green Waltz (Firth, Hall & Pond), 1844
- La Vivandiere: Grand Valse (Stayman & Bros.), 1851
- Mount's Quick Step: as performed by the New York brass band (Millet's Music Saloon), 1844
- North Carolina Grand March (William Venderbeek), 1846
- Twilight Waltz (F. W. Ratcliffe), 1851
- Un Souvenir, for the Piano. Op. 185 (Oliver Ditson), 1899
- Summer Blossom Polka (G. W. Brainard & Co.), 1851
- Vive la Republique (arr. of La Marseillaise) (William Hall), 1848
- The Wild Brier Polka (G.W. Brainard), 1851

Vocal music

- The Awakening of Italy (Italian text by G.F. Secchi di Casali) (William Hall), 1848
- Bingen on the Rhine (G. P. Reed), 1847
- Full Many Years Ago (text by Rev. Sidney Dyer) (G. W. Brainard & Co.), 1851
- The Gipsy in the North (Eugene Liés), (Firth, Hall, & Pond), 1846
- The Heart's Despair, 1848
- I Wandered in the Woodlands (William Hall), 1849
- Jingle, Jingle, Clear the Way (1844)
- Let Me Perish in the Early Spring (1845)
- Memory of the Past (J. L. Cummings), 1847
- Music From Afar (vocal duet) (Firth, Hall, & Pond), 1846
- My Cynosure (John F. Nunns), 1845
- O'er the Wildly Heaving Sea (Firth Hall & Pond), 1845
- Oh! my Heart is Weary Waiting (Summer Longings) (Edward L. Walker), 1849
- Our Childhood's Home (text by Henry John Sharpe) (William Hall), 1848
- The Pequote Brave (1844)
- Slumber, Infant! Slumber (Duet for two sopranos) (John F. Nunns), 1845
- Speed Away: a song founded on a beautiful Indian superstition (Firth, Hall & Pond), 1847
- The Saw Mill (Die Säge Mühle) (William Hall), 1848
- They Tell Me Thou art Gay Once More! (P. K. Weizel), 1848
- Thou'rt Weeping Still (Peters, Webb & Co.), 1851
- Winter Flowers (1850)
