= Wacker Bernburg =

German football club

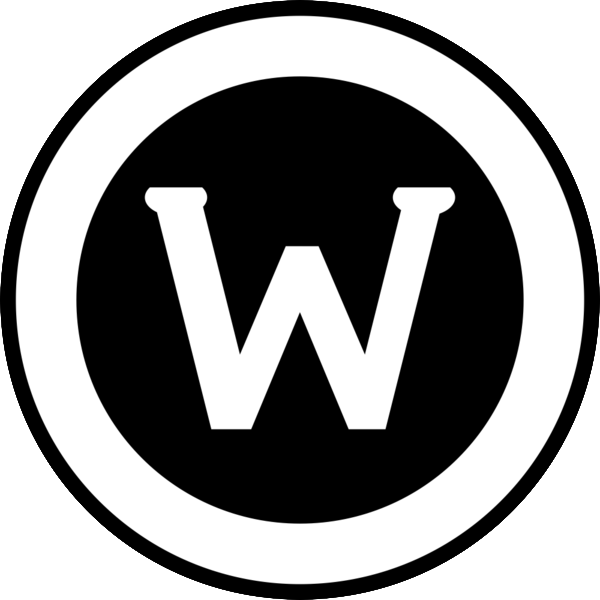
- Full name: Sportverein Wacker Bernburg
- Founded: 1910
- Dissolved: 1945
- Ground: Sportplatz Bernburg
- Capacity: 3,000
Home colours	Away colours

Wacker Bernburg was a German association football club from the city of Bernburg, Saxony-Anhalt that was established in 1910 as Fußball Club Wacker Bernburg. The club changed its name to Sportverein Wacker Bernburg in 1926.

Wacker played in the Anhalt circuit that was part of the Mitteldeutsche Fussball Verband (Central German Football League) where they won titles in 1930 and 1931. Those wins advanced the club to the league championship round where they were put out in eighth-final matches by Sturm Chemnitz (3:1) and Wacker Halle (5:1). Wacker failed to qualify to take part in the newly formed Gauliga Sachsen (I) in 1933 and remained a Bezirksliga side until disappearing at the end of World War II in 1945.

== Honours ==
- Bezirksliga Anhalt champions: 1930, 1931
