= Osternienburger Land =

- Municipality
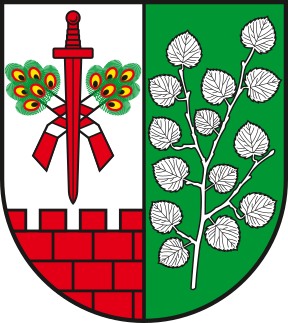
- Coat of arms

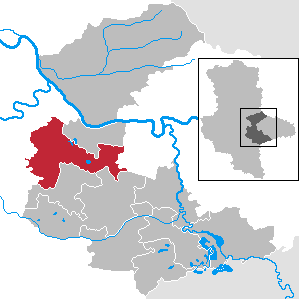
- Location of Osternienburger Land within Anhalt-Bitterfeld district
- Interactive map of Osternienburger Land
- Location within Germany Location within Saxony-Anhalt
- Coordinates: 51°48′N 12°1′E
- Country: Germany
- State: Saxony-Anhalt
- District: Anhalt-Bitterfeld

Government
  - Mayor (2023–30): Torsten Lorenz (CDU)

Area
  - Total: 138.73 km^{2} (53.56 sq mi)
- Elevation: 71 m (233 ft)

Population (2025-12-31)
  - Total: 7,880
  - Density: 56.8/km^{2} (147/sq mi)
- Time zone: UTC+01:00 (CET)
  - Summer (DST): UTC+02:00 (CEST)
- Postal codes: 06386
- Dialling codes: 034909, 03496, 034973, 034977, 034979
- Vehicle registration: ABI
- Website: www.osternienburgerland.de

Osternienburger Land (German pronunciation: [ˌoːstɐˈniːnbʊʁɡɐ ˌlant]) is a municipality in the district of Anhalt-Bitterfeld, in Saxony-Anhalt, Germany. It was formed on 1 January 2010 by the merger of the former municipalities Chörau, Diebzig, Dornbock, Drosa, Elsnigk, Großpaschleben, Kleinpaschleben, Libbesdorf, Micheln, Osternienburg, Reppichau, Trinum, Wulfen and Zabitz. These 14 former municipalities are now Ortschaften or municipal divisions of Osternienburger Land.
