= Chörau =

- Ortsteil of Osternienburger Land
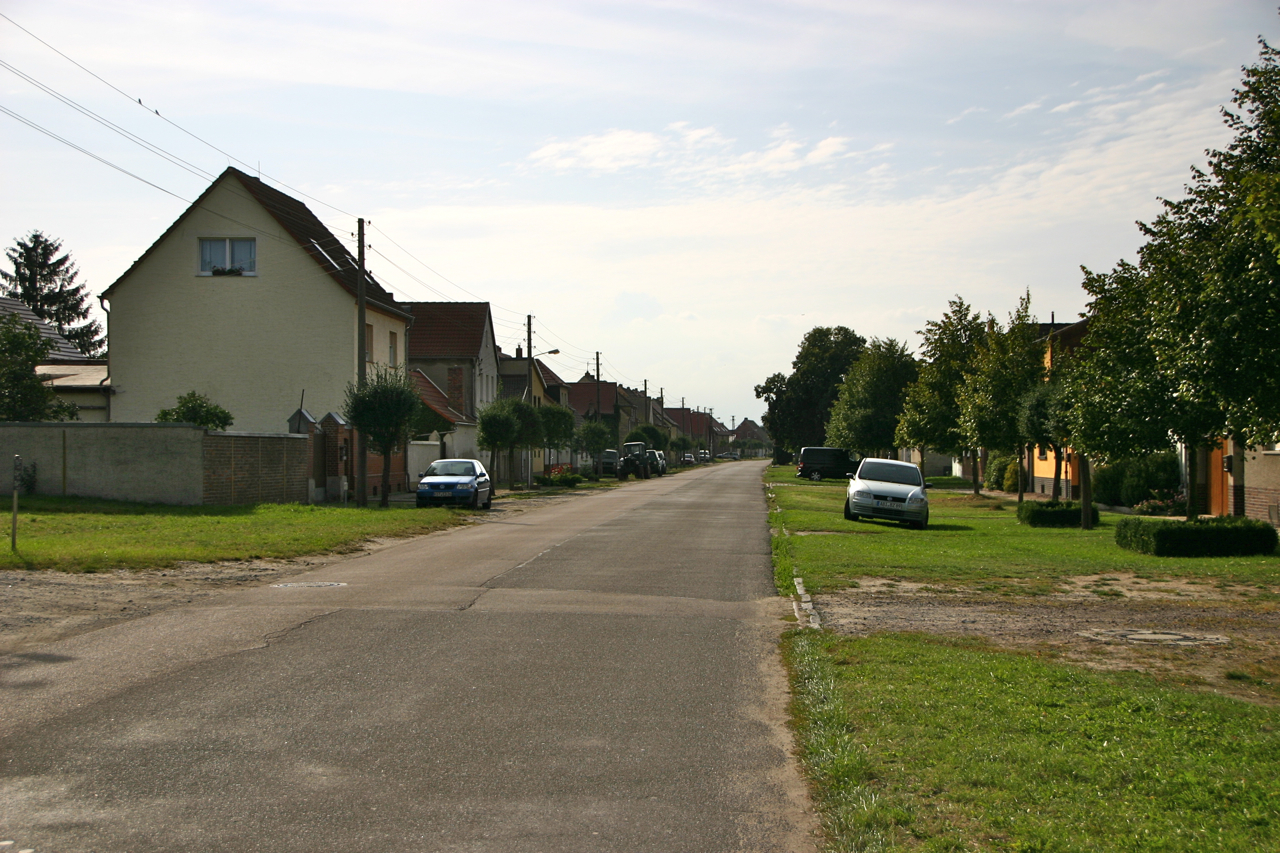

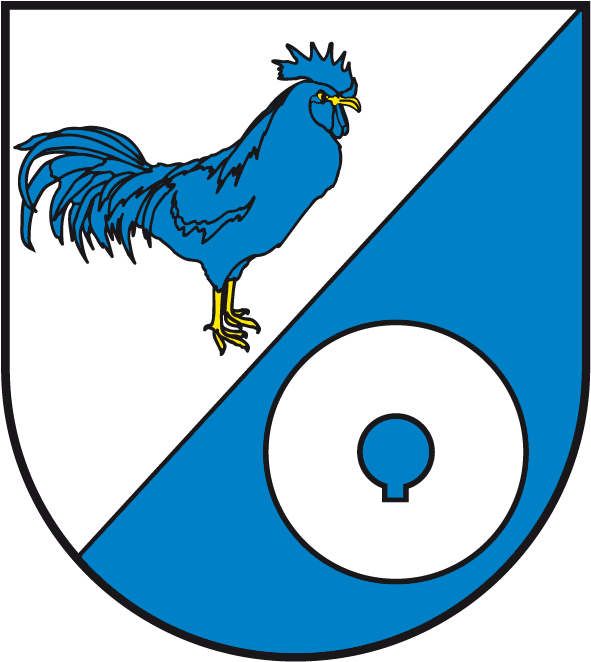
- Coat of arms
- Interactive map of Chörau
- Location within Germany Location within Saxony-Anhalt
- Coordinates: 51°49′N 12°7′E
- Country: Germany
- State: Saxony-Anhalt
- District: Anhalt-Bitterfeld
- Municipality: Osternienburger Land

Area
  - Total: 4.19 km^{2} (1.62 sq mi)
- Elevation: 59 m (194 ft)

Population (2006-12-31)
  - Total: 247
  - Density: 58.9/km^{2} (153/sq mi)
- Time zone: UTC+01:00 (CET)
  - Summer (DST): UTC+02:00 (CEST)
- Postal codes: 06386
- Dialling codes: 034909
- Vehicle registration: ABI

Chörau (German pronunciation: [ˈkøːʁaʊ]) is a village and a former municipality in the district of Anhalt-Bitterfeld, in Saxony-Anhalt, Germany.

Since 1 January 2010, it is part of the municipality Osternienburger Land.
