= Elsnigk =

- Ortsteil of Osternienburger Land
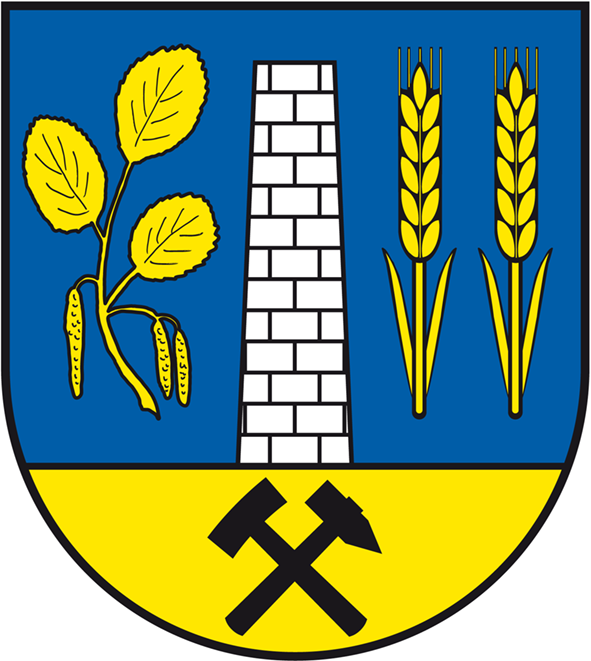
- Coat of arms
- Interactive map of Elsnigk
- Location within Germany Location within Saxony-Anhalt
- Coordinates: 51°47′N 12°3′E
- Country: Germany
- State: Saxony-Anhalt
- District: Anhalt-Bitterfeld
- Municipality: Osternienburger Land

Area
  - Total: 6.91 km^{2} (2.67 sq mi)
- Elevation: 73 m (240 ft)

Population (2006-12-31)
  - Total: 719
  - Density: 104/km^{2} (269/sq mi)
- Time zone: UTC+01:00 (CET)
  - Summer (DST): UTC+02:00 (CEST)
- Postal codes: 06386
- Dialling codes: 034973
- Vehicle registration: ABI

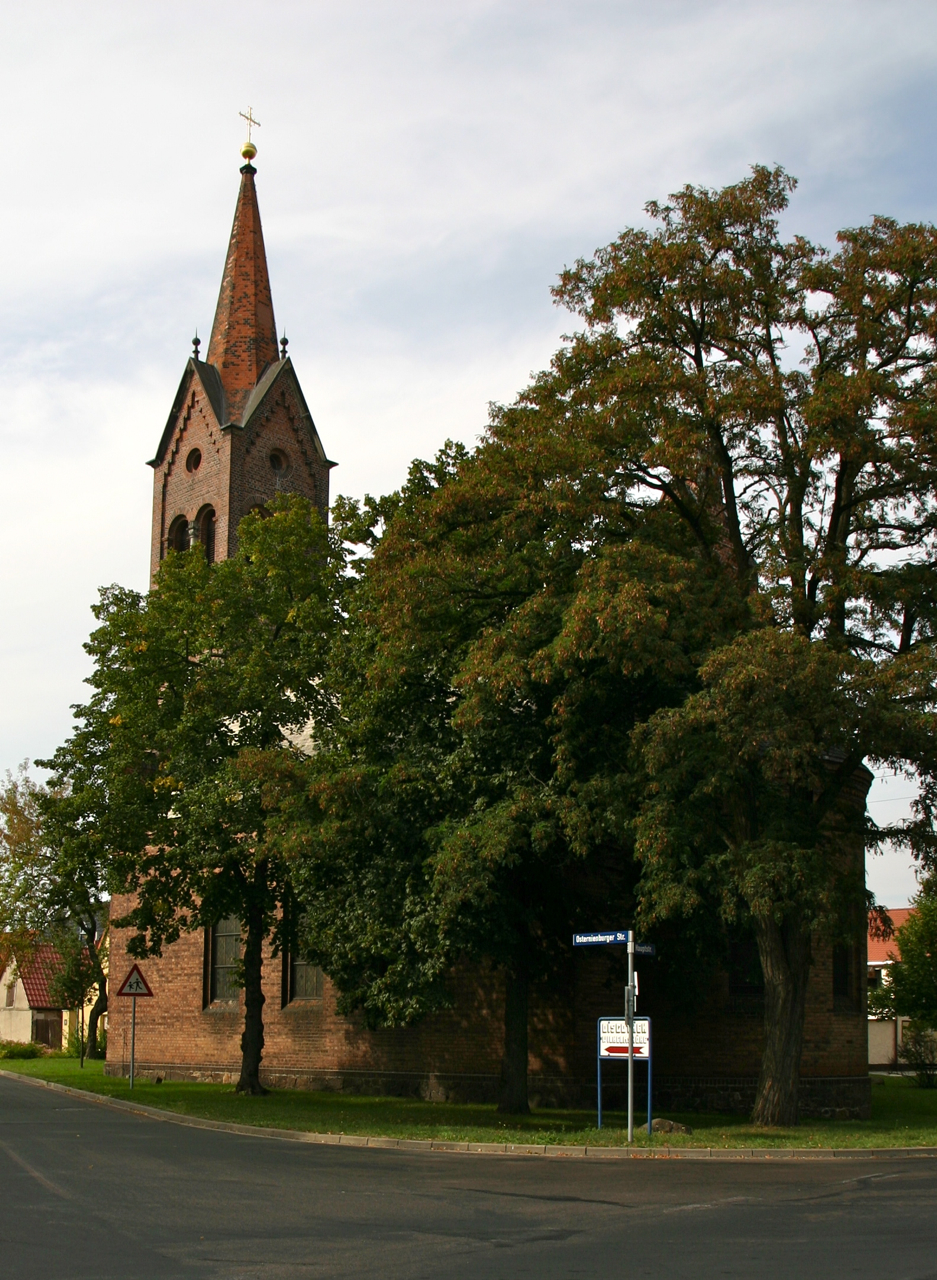
Church

Elsnigk (German pronunciation: [ˈɛlsnɪk]) is a village and a former municipality in the district of Anhalt-Bitterfeld, in Saxony-Anhalt, Germany.

Since 1 January 2010, it is part of the municipality Osternienburger Land.
