= Wulfen =

- Ortsteil of Osternienburger Land
- Coat of arms
- Interactive map of Wulfen
- Location within Germany Location within Saxony-Anhalt
- Coordinates: 51°49′N 11°56′E
- Country: Germany
- State: Saxony-Anhalt
- District: Anhalt-Bitterfeld
- Municipality: Osternienburger Land

Area
  - Total: 10.67 km^{2} (4.12 sq mi)
- Elevation: 68 m (223 ft)

Population (2006-12-31)
  - Total: 1,171
  - Density: 109.7/km^{2} (284.2/sq mi)
- Time zone: UTC+01:00 (CET)
  - Summer (DST): UTC+02:00 (CEST)
- Postal codes: 06369
- Dialling codes: 034979
- Vehicle registration: ABI

Wulfen (German pronunciation: [ˈvʊlfn̩]) is a village and a former municipality in the district of Anhalt-Bitterfeld, in Saxony-Anhalt, Germany.

Since 1 January 2010, it is part of the municipality Osternienburger Land.
