= Poley, Louisiana =

Unincorporated community in Louisiana

- Unincorporated community
- Location within Louisiana Location within the United States
- Coordinates: 30°37′29″N 90°50′40″W
- Country: United States
- State: Louisiana
- Parish: Livingston
- Elevation: 92 ft (28 m)
- Time zone: UTC-6 (Central (CST))
  - Summer (DST): UTC-5 (CDT)
- ZIP code: 70754
- Area code: 225
- GNIS feature ID: 552052
- FIPS code: 22-57695

Poley, also known as Poley Bayou, is an unincorporated community in Livingston Parish, Louisiana, United States. The community is located 2 miles (3.2 kilometres) northwest of French Settlement and 2 miles (3.2 kilometres) east of Port Vincent.

== History ==
An early settler named Calvin Doris Bowman scouted the area sometime in the 1830s and exclaimed to his companions, "This is just about the poliest place I ever saw." and that was the name given to the area. A post office was built here on December 31, 1909, and a man named Martin L. Bowman was appointed as the first postmaster.
