= Pobzig =

- Stadtteil of Nienburg
- Interactive map of Pobzig
- Location within Germany Location within Saxony-Anhalt
- Coordinates: 51°49′N 11°51′E
- Country: Germany
- State: Saxony-Anhalt
- District: Salzlandkreis
- Town: Nienburg

Area
  - Total: 10.99 km^{2} (4.24 sq mi)
- Elevation: 74 m (243 ft)

Population (2006-12-31)
  - Total: 401
  - Density: 36.5/km^{2} (94.5/sq mi)
- Time zone: UTC+01:00 (CET)
  - Summer (DST): UTC+02:00 (CEST)
- Postal codes: 06429
- Dialling codes: 034721

Pobzig is a village and a former municipality in the district Salzlandkreis, in Saxony-Anhalt, Germany. Since 1 January 2010, it is part of the town Nienburg.
