= Micheln =

- Ortsteil of Osternienburger Land
- Coat of arms
- Interactive map of Micheln
- Location within Germany Location within Saxony-Anhalt
- Coordinates: 51°48′N 11°58′E
- Country: Germany
- State: Saxony-Anhalt
- District: Anhalt-Bitterfeld
- Municipality: Osternienburger Land

Area
  - Total: 16.58 km^{2} (6.40 sq mi)
- Elevation: 69 m (226 ft)

Population (2006-12-31)
  - Total: 770
  - Density: 46/km^{2} (120/sq mi)
- Time zone: UTC+01:00 (CET)
  - Summer (DST): UTC+02:00 (CEST)
- Postal codes: 06386
- Dialling codes: 034973
- Vehicle registration: ABI

Micheln (German pronunciation: [ˈmɪçl̩n]) is a village and a former municipality in the district of Anhalt-Bitterfeld, in Saxony-Anhalt, Germany.

Since 1 January 2010, it is part of the municipality Osternienburger Land.

On 23 June 2004 the village was severely damaged by a F3 tornado having wind speeds until 300 km/h. 70% of the village's buildings were nearly destroyed. Although the tornado belonged to the strongest in 30 years, nobody was killed.
