= Reppichau =

- Ortsteil of Osternienburger Land
- Coat of arms
- Interactive map of Reppichau
- Location within Germany Location within Saxony-Anhalt
- Coordinates: 51°48′N 12°4′E
- Country: Germany
- State: Saxony-Anhalt
- District: Anhalt-Bitterfeld
- Municipality: Osternienburger Land

Area
  - Total: 10.96 km^{2} (4.23 sq mi)
- Elevation: 71 m (233 ft)

Population (2006-12-31)
  - Total: 481
  - Density: 43.9/km^{2} (114/sq mi)
- Time zone: UTC+01:00 (CET)
  - Summer (DST): UTC+02:00 (CEST)
- Postal codes: 06386
- Dialling codes: 034909
- Website: www.reppichau.de

Reppichau (German pronunciation: [ˈʁɛpɪçaʊ]) is a village and a former municipality in the district of Anhalt-Bitterfeld, in Saxony-Anhalt, Germany. Since 1 January 2010, it is part of the municipality Osternienburger Land. It is the birthplace of Eike of Repgow (Repgow being an older spelling of the name of the village).
