= Wedlitz =

- Stadtteil of Nienburg
- Interactive map of Wedlitz
- Location within Germany Location within Saxony-Anhalt
- Coordinates: 51°52′N 11°46′E
- Country: Germany
- State: Saxony-Anhalt
- District: Salzlandkreis
- Town: Nienburg

Area
  - Total: 11.81 km^{2} (4.56 sq mi)
- Elevation: 56 m (184 ft)

Population (2006-12-31)
  - Total: 425
  - Density: 36.0/km^{2} (93.2/sq mi)
- Time zone: UTC+01:00 (CET)
  - Summer (DST): UTC+02:00 (CEST)
- Postal codes: 06429
- Dialling codes: 034721

Wedlitz is a village and a former municipality in the district Salzlandkreis, in Saxony-Anhalt, Germany. Since 1 January 2010, it is part of the town Nienburg.
