= Wiendorf, Saxony-Anhalt =

Wiendorf
- Stadtteil of Könnern
- Interactive map of Wiendorf
- Location within Germany Location within Saxony-Anhalt
- Coordinates: 51°43′N 11°49′E
- Country: Germany
- State: Saxony-Anhalt
- District: Salzlandkreis
- Town: Könnern

Area
  - Total: 3.65 km^{2} (1.41 sq mi)
- Elevation: 68 m (223 ft)

Population (2006-12-31)
  - Total: 330
  - Density: 90/km^{2} (230/sq mi)
- Time zone: UTC+01:00 (CET)
  - Summer (DST): UTC+02:00 (CEST)
- Postal codes: 06420
- Dialling codes: 034691

Wiendorf is a village and a former municipality in the district Salzlandkreis, in Saxony-Anhalt, Germany.

Since 1 January 2010, it has been part of the town Könnern.
