= Drosa =

- Ortsteil of Osternienburger Land
- Coat of arms
- Interactive map of Drosa
- Location within Germany Location within Saxony-Anhalt
- Coordinates: 51°48′58.64″N 11°54′27.79″E
- Country: Germany
- State: Saxony-Anhalt
- District: Anhalt-Bitterfeld
- Municipality: Osternienburger Land

Area
  - Total: 10.57 km^{2} (4.08 sq mi)
- Elevation: 77 m (253 ft)

Population (2006-12-31)
  - Total: 615
  - Density: 58.2/km^{2} (151/sq mi)
- Time zone: UTC+01:00 (CET)
  - Summer (DST): UTC+02:00 (CEST)
- Postal codes: 06369
- Dialling codes: 034979
- Vehicle registration: ABI

Drosa (German pronunciation: [ˈdʁoːza]) is a village and a former municipality in the district of Anhalt-Bitterfeld, in Saxony-Anhalt, Germany.

Since 1 January 2010, it is part of the municipality Osternienburger Land.
