= Gerbitz =

- Stadtteil of Nienburg
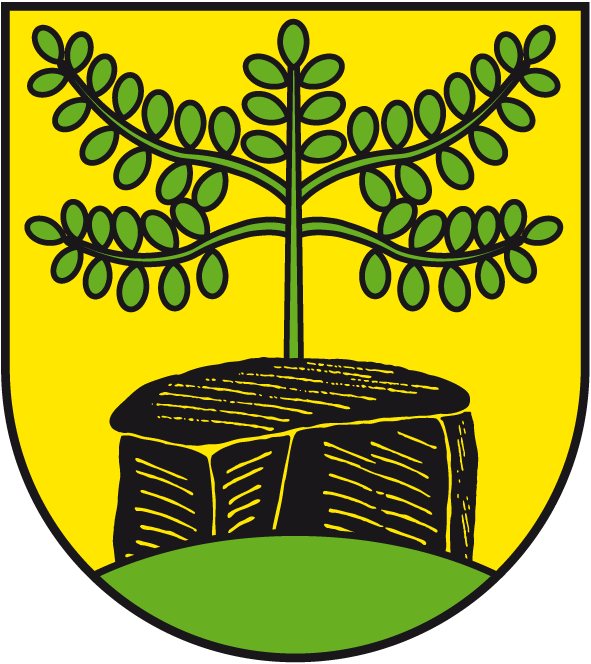
- Coat of arms
- Interactive map of Gerbitz
- Location within Germany Location within Saxony-Anhalt
- Coordinates: 51°50′N 11°49′E
- Country: Germany
- State: Saxony-Anhalt
- District: Salzlandkreis
- Town: Nienburg

Area
  - Total: 9.02 km^{2} (3.48 sq mi)
- Elevation: 74 m (243 ft)

Population (2006-12-31)
  - Total: 652
  - Density: 72.3/km^{2} (187/sq mi)
- Time zone: UTC+01:00 (CET)
  - Summer (DST): UTC+02:00 (CEST)
- Postal codes: 06429
- Dialling codes: 034721

Gerbitz is a village and a former municipality in the district Salzlandkreis, in Saxony-Anhalt, Germany. Since 1 January 2010, it is part of the town Nienburg.
