= Dornbock =

- Ortsteil of Osternienburger Land
- Coat of arms
- Interactive map of Dornbock
- Location within Germany Location within Saxony-Anhalt
- Coordinates: 51°50′N 11°53′E
- Country: Germany
- State: Saxony-Anhalt
- District: Anhalt-Bitterfeld
- Municipality: Osternienburger Land

Area
  - Total: 11.92 km^{2} (4.60 sq mi)
- Elevation: 70 m (230 ft)

Population (2006-12-31)
  - Total: 372
  - Density: 31.2/km^{2} (80.8/sq mi)
- Time zone: UTC+01:00 (CET)
  - Summer (DST): UTC+02:00 (CEST)
- Postal codes: 06369
- Dialling codes: 034979

Dornbock (German pronunciation: [ˈdɔʁnˌbɔk]) is a village and a former municipality in the district of Anhalt-Bitterfeld, in Saxony-Anhalt, Germany.

Since 1 January 2010, it is part of the municipality Osternienburger Land.
