= Nienburg, Saxony-Anhalt =

Nienburg
- Town
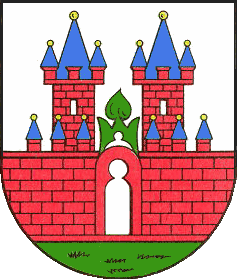
- Coat of arms

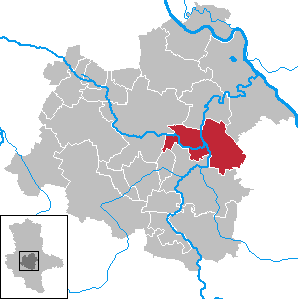
- Location of Nienburg within Salzlandkreis district
- Interactive map of Nienburg
- Location within Germany Location within Saxony-Anhalt
- Coordinates: 51°49′N 11°45′E
- Country: Germany
- State: Saxony-Anhalt
- District: Salzlandkreis

Government
  - Mayor (2021–28): Susan Falke

Area
  - Total: 79.10 km^{2} (30.54 sq mi)
- Elevation: 65 m (213 ft)

Population (2025-12-31)
  - Total: 5,607
  - Density: 70.88/km^{2} (183.6/sq mi)
- Time zone: UTC+01:00 (CET)
  - Summer (DST): UTC+02:00 (CEST)
- Postal codes: 06429
- Dialling codes: 034721
- Vehicle registration: SLK
- Website: www.stadt-nienburg-saale.de

Nienburg (German: [ˈniːnˌbʊʁk]) is a town in the district of Salzlandkreis in Saxony-Anhalt, Germany. It is located in the lower Saale valley, approx. 5 km northeast of Bernburg. In January 2010 it absorbed the former municipalities Gerbitz, Latdorf, Neugattersleben, Pobzig and Wedlitz, that became Ortschaften or municipal divisions of the town. In 2020 its population was 6,104.

Nienburg is first mentioned in travel records dating from 961. The medieval centre of the town is occupied by the Benedictine monastery, Nienburg Abbey, later turned into a castle, recently destroyed by fire. The church of the monastery, over 1000 years old, was inaugurated in 1004, and is beautifully preserved to this day.

In 1623, during the Thirty Years' War, part of the town was destroyed. On December 6, 1825, an early cable-stayed bridge over the river Saale collapsed during a celebration honoring the bridge's patron. 55 people were killed, 60 were injured, and two people remained missing. The bridge had been open for just three months. A contributing factor may have been youths attempting to get the bridge to sway to the tune of "God Save the King."

== Notable people ==
- Odo I, Margrave of the Saxon Ostmark (around 930–983), buried in the monastery Nienburg an der Saale
- Ibrahim ibn Jaqub, (10th-century), Hispano-Arabic, Sephardi Jewish traveler, first mention of Nienburg
- Annalista Saxo (mid-12th century), Nienburg chronicler
- Gustav Flügel (1812–1900), composer
- Friedrich Stahmann (b. January 1796 in Nienburg (Saale), † 30 April 1862 ibid.) was a German surgeon and writer of the end-Romantic period.
