= Gerlebogk =

- Stadtteil of Könnern
- Interactive map of Gerlebogk
- Location within Germany Location within Saxony-Anhalt
- Coordinates: 51°42′N 11°50′E
- Country: Germany
- State: Saxony-Anhalt
- District: Salzlandkreis
- Town: Könnern

Area
  - Total: 5.77 km^{2} (2.23 sq mi)
- Elevation: 94 m (308 ft)

Population (2006-12-31)
  - Total: 339
  - Density: 58.8/km^{2} (152/sq mi)
- Time zone: UTC+01:00 (CET)
  - Summer (DST): UTC+02:00 (CEST)
- Postal codes: 06420
- Dialling codes: 034691

Gerlebogk is a village and a former municipality in the district Salzlandkreis, in Saxony-Anhalt, Germany.

Since 1 January 2010, it is part of the town Könnern.
