= Libbesdorf =

- Ortsteil of Osternienburger Land
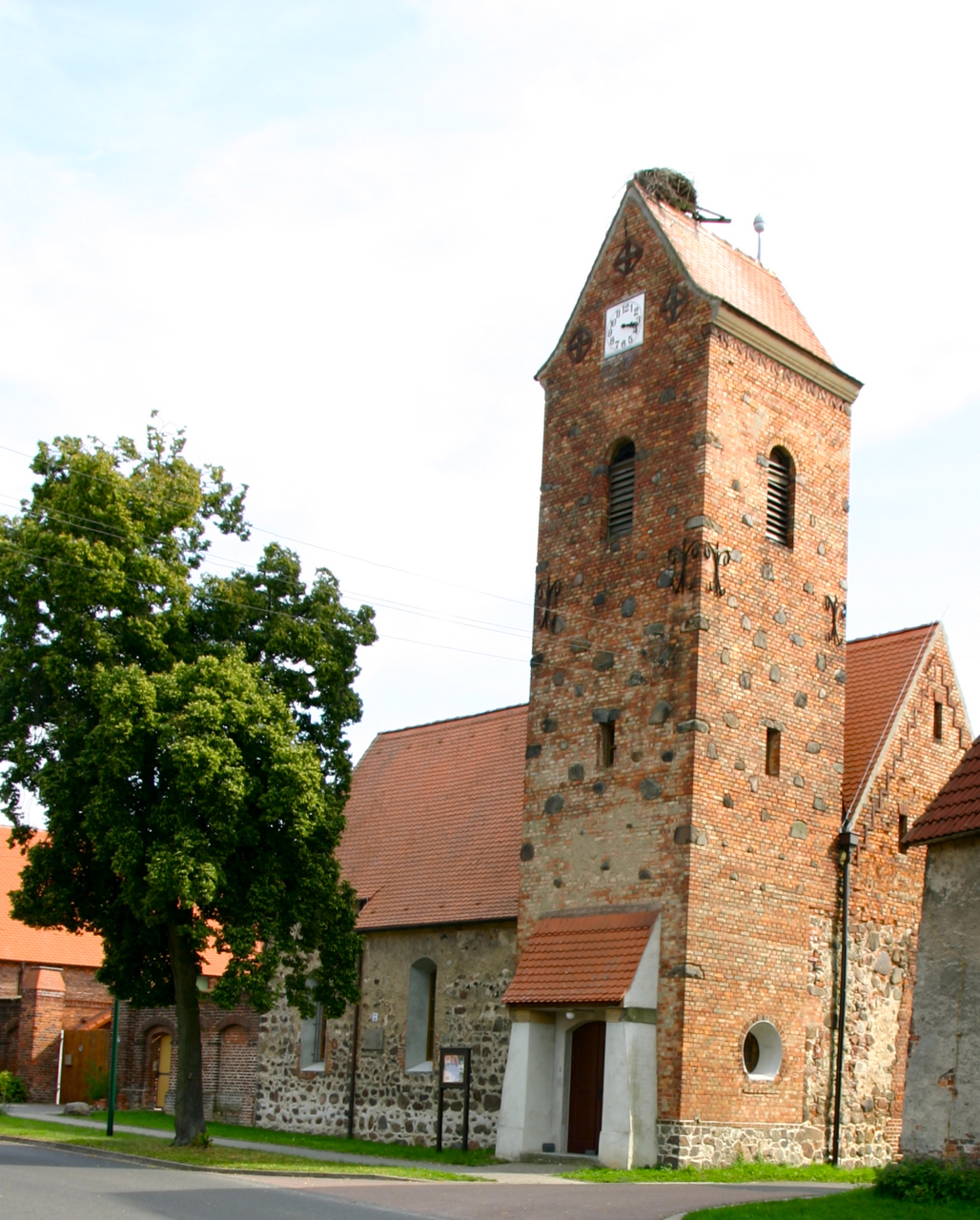

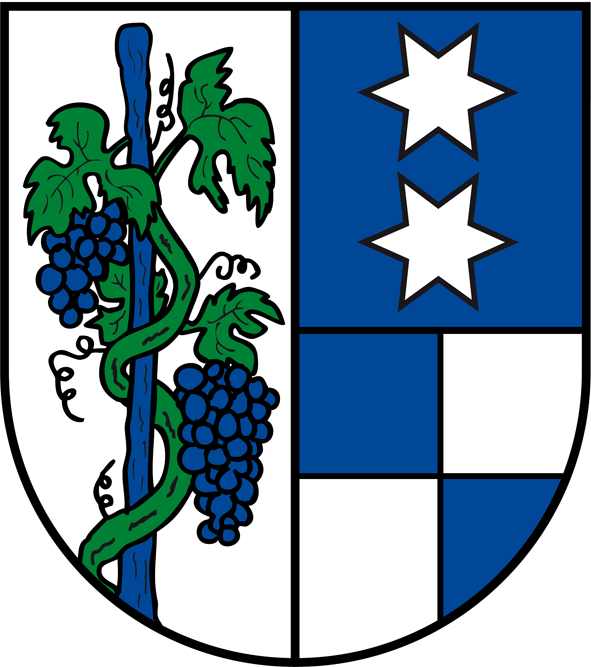
- Coat of arms
- Interactive map of Libbesdorf
- Location within Germany Location within Saxony-Anhalt
- Coordinates: 51°46′N 12°6′E
- Country: Germany
- State: Saxony-Anhalt
- District: Anhalt-Bitterfeld
- Municipality: Osternienburger Land

Area
  - Total: 9.29 km^{2} (3.59 sq mi)
- Elevation: 75 m (246 ft)

Population (2006-12-31)
  - Total: 401
  - Density: 43.2/km^{2} (112/sq mi)
- Time zone: UTC+01:00 (CET)
  - Summer (DST): UTC+02:00 (CEST)
- Postal codes: 06386
- Dialling codes: 034977
- Vehicle registration: ABI

Libbesdorf (German pronunciation: [ˈlɪbəsdɔʁf]) is a village and a former municipality in the district of Anhalt-Bitterfeld, in Saxony-Anhalt, Germany.

Since 1 January 2010, it is part of the municipality Osternienburger Land.
