= Bernburg =

Town in Saxony-Anhalt, Germany

- Town
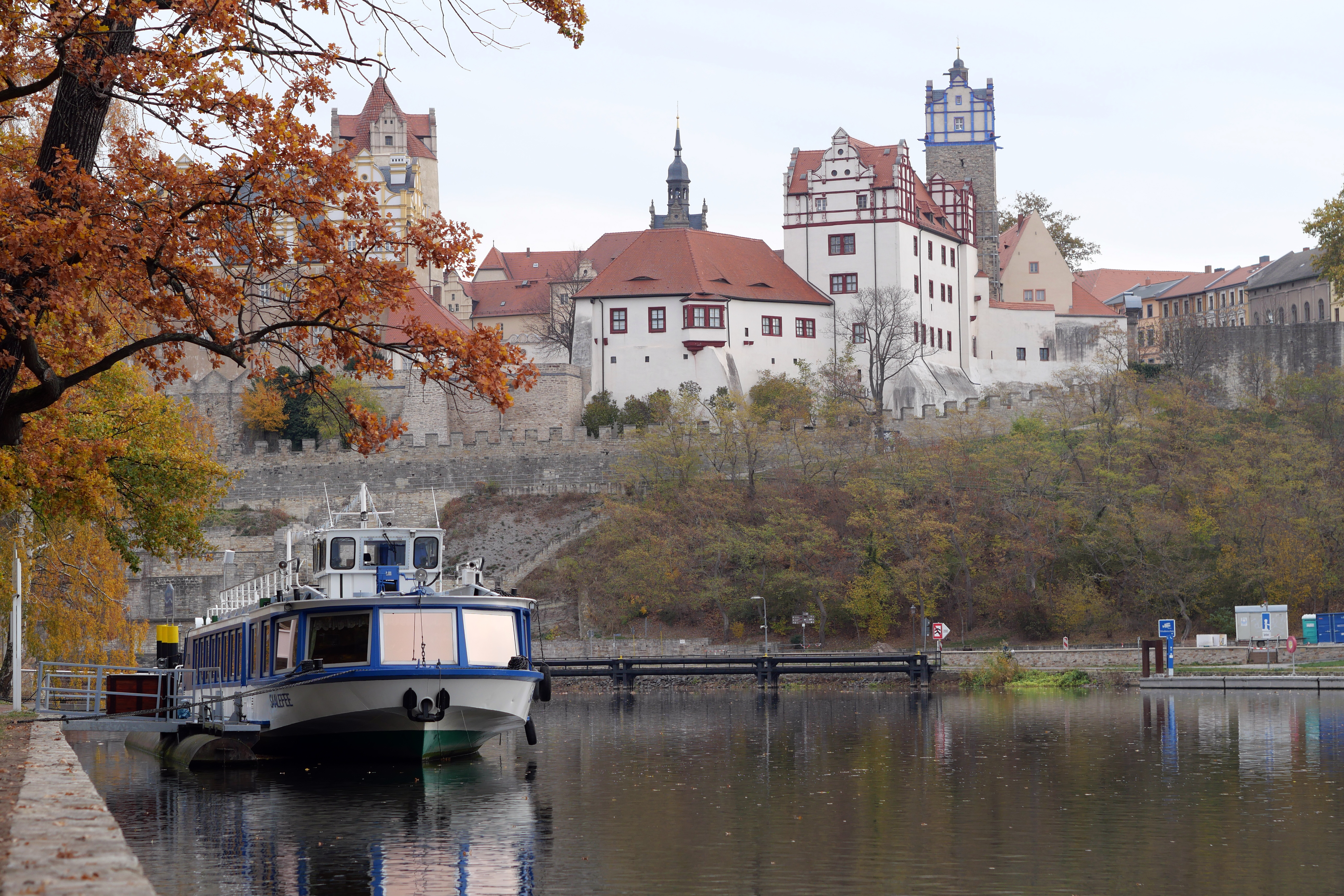
- Bernburg Castle on the Saale river

- Coat of arms

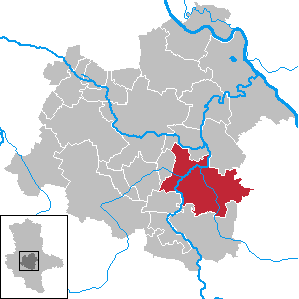
- Location of Bernburg within Salzlandkreis district
- Interactive map of Bernburg
- Location within Germany Location within Saxony-Anhalt
- Coordinates: 51°48′N 11°44′E
- Country: Germany
- State: Saxony-Anhalt
- District: Salzlandkreis
- Subdivisions: 7

Government
  - Mayor (2021–28): Silvia Ristow (Left)

Area
  - Total: 113.48 km^{2} (43.81 sq mi)
- Elevation: 85 m (279 ft)

Population (2025-12-31)
  - Total: 30,572
  - Density: 269.40/km^{2} (697.75/sq mi)
- Time zone: UTC+01:00 (CET)
  - Summer (DST): UTC+02:00 (CEST)
- Postal codes: 06406
- Dialling codes: 03471, 034692
- Vehicle registration: SLK
- Website: www.bernburg.de

Bernburg (Saale) (German pronunciation: [ˈbɛʁnˌbʊʁk]) is a town in Saxony-Anhalt, Germany, capital of the Salzlandkreis district. The former residence of the Anhalt-Bernburg princes is known for its Renaissance castle.

== Geography ==
The town centre is situated in the fertile Magdeburg Börde lowland on the Saale river, approx. 40 km (25 mi) downstream from Halle and 45 km (28 mi) up stream from Magdeburg. It is dominated by the huge Bernburg Castle featuring a museum as well as a popular, recently updated bear pit in its moat.

The municipal area comprises the town Bernburg proper and eight Ortschaften or municipal divisions: Aderstedt (incorporated in 2003), Baalberge, Biendorf, Gröna, Peißen, Poley, Preußlitz, and Wohlsdorf, all incorporated on 1 January 2010.

Bernburg is a stop on the scenic Romanesque Road (Strasse der Romanik).

== Paleontology ==
Type fossil of temnospondyl amphibian Trematosaurus brauni was found in the Late Olenekian (Lower Triassic) deposits of Merkel's Quarry, near Bernburg.

== History ==
Several archaeological sites in the area refer to the Walternienburg-Bernburg Culture, a mid-Neolithic funnelbeaker culture from about 3200 to 2800 BC. Agriculture on the fertile Loess soil was already common in prehistoric times. Around 150 AD, a local settlement named Luppia was mentioned in the Geography by Ptolemy. In the Early Middle Ages, the Saale River marked the border between the German stem duchies in the west and the lands of the Polabian Slavs in the east.

The present-day borough of Waldau (which became part of Bernburg in 1871) was first mentioned in a 782 deed and again in 806 as Waladala in the chronicles of Moissac Abbey; the village church dedicated to St Stephen first appeared in 964, the nowadays building dates from around 1150. Bernburg itself was first mentioned as civitas Brandanburg in a 961 deed issued by King Otto I of Germany. According to the Annalista Saxo, Berneburch Castle, then a possession of the Ascanian prince Albert the Bear, was set on fire by his enemies in 1138. In 1252 the rebuilt castle became the residence of Albert's great-grandson Prince Bernhard I of Anhalt-Bernburg.

=== World War II ===
During the Nazi dictatorship, a wing of the town's mental hospital was used for the mass-murder of an estimated 15,000 people as part of Action T4 and Action 14f13. The victims included Jews, people with physical and mental illnesses, and concentration camp inmates. The site today houses a memorial commemorating the victims.

Bernburg was also the location of forced labour subcamps of the Nazi prisons in Magdeburg and Coswig.

== Gallery ==
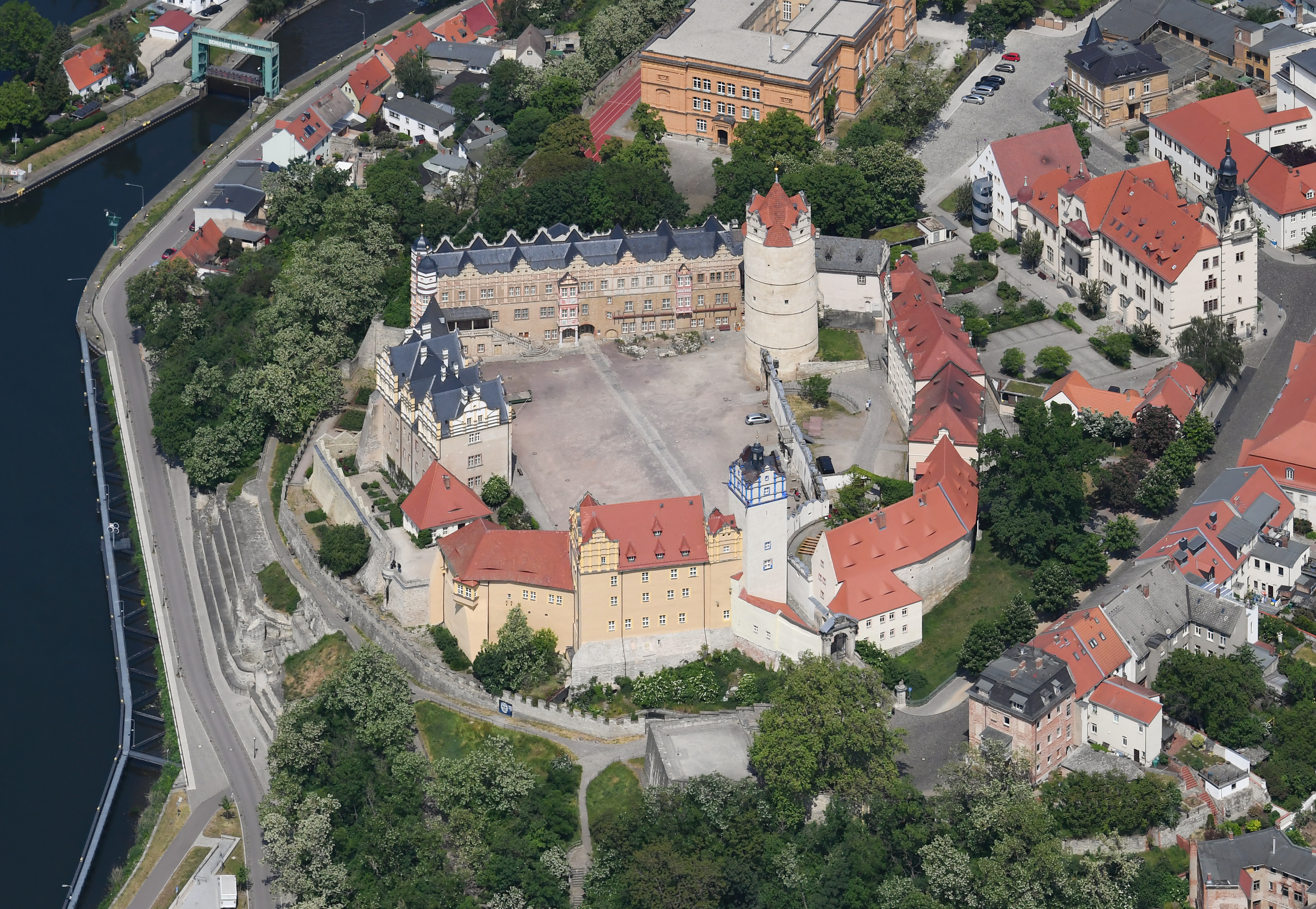
Bernburg Castle aerial view

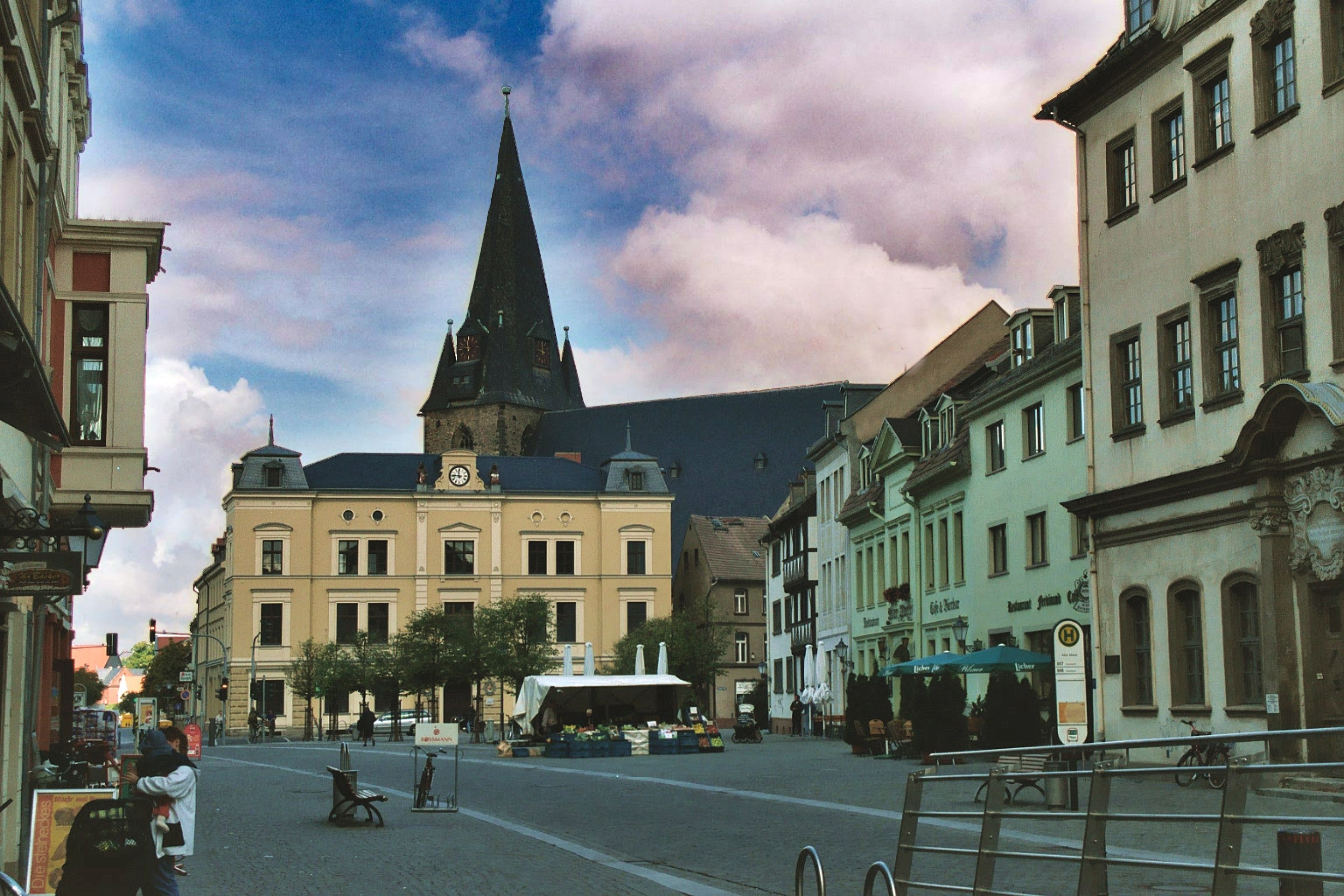
Old town hall and St. Mary´s Church (inner city)

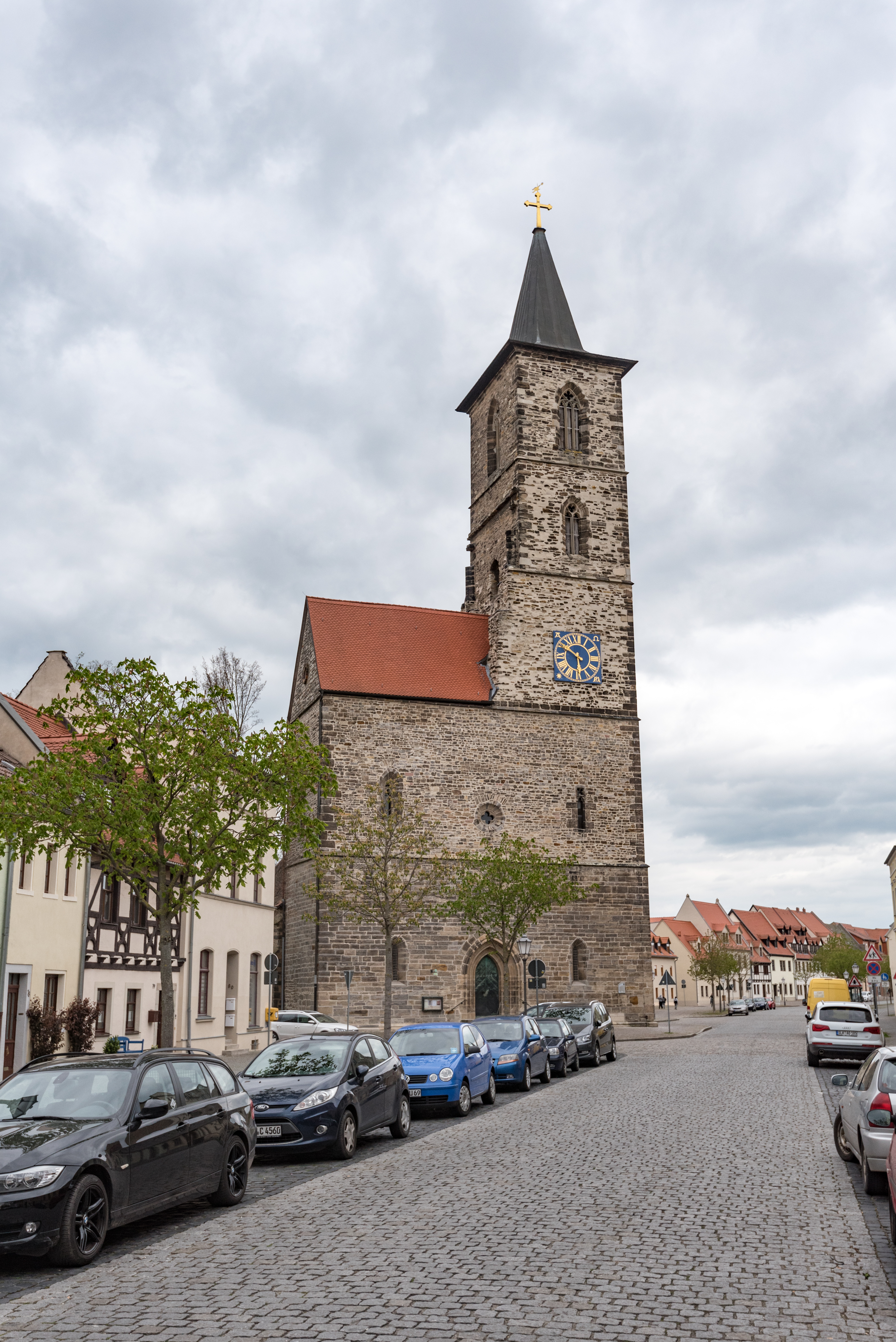
St. Nicolai church

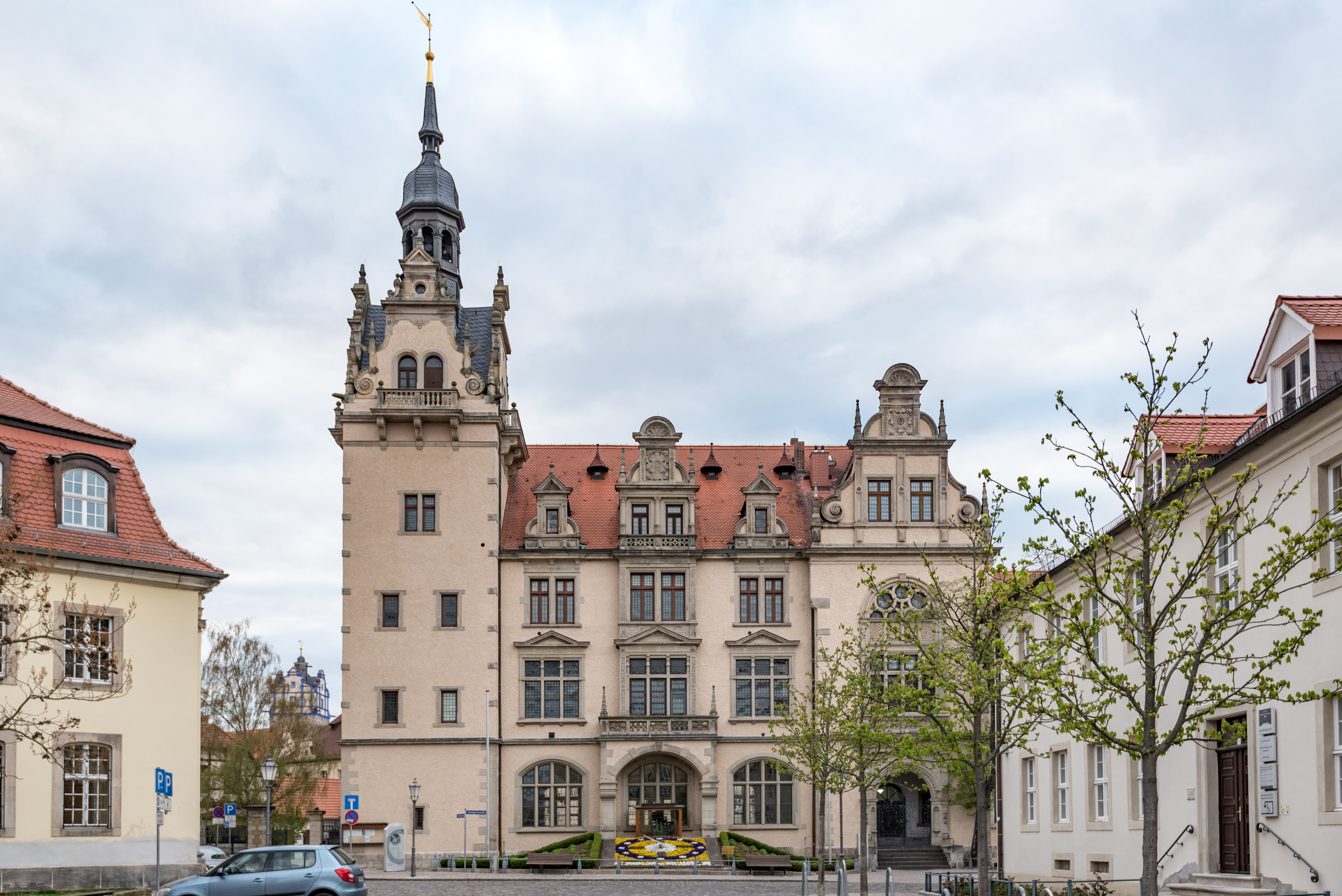
Town Hall

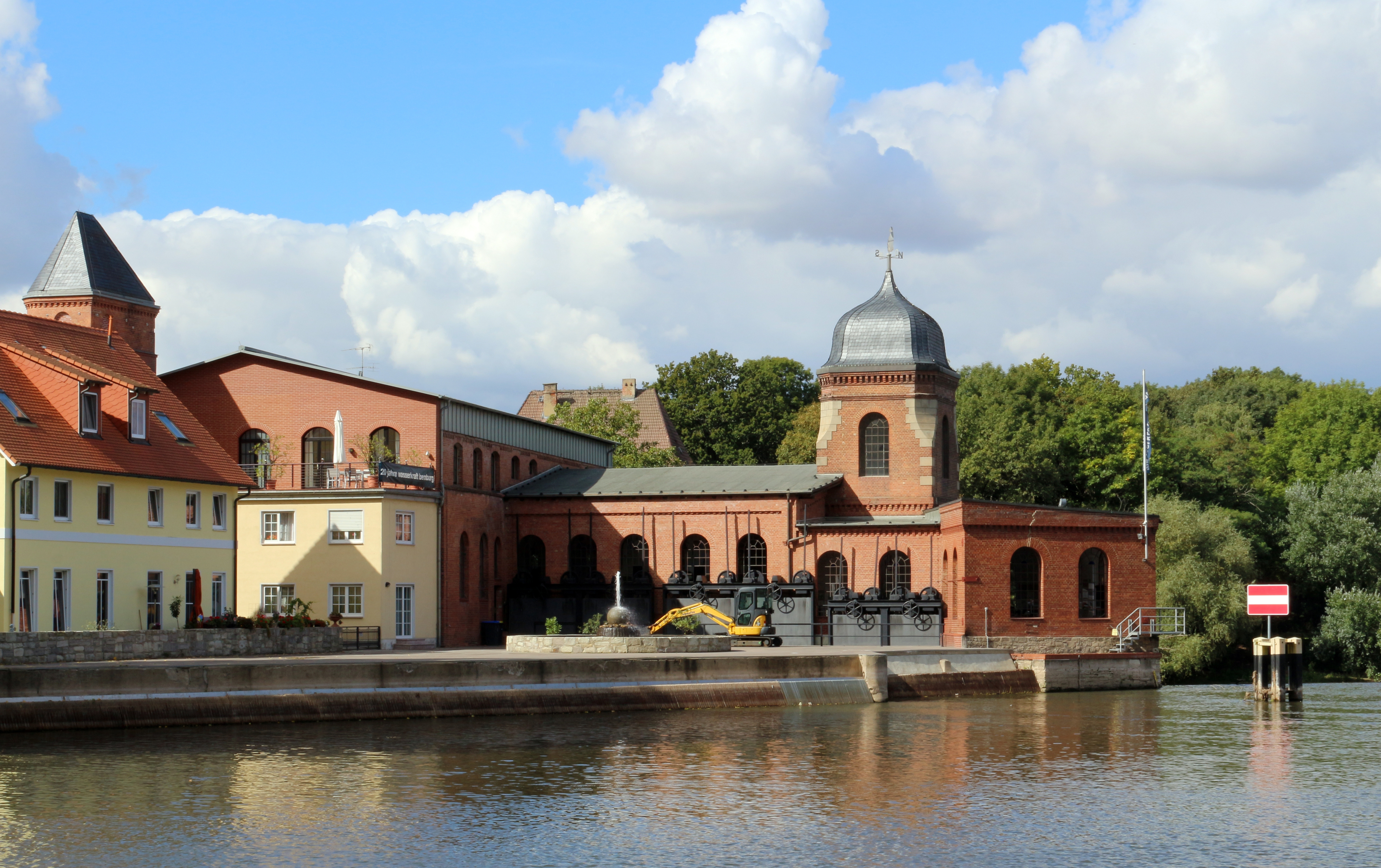
Old mill at Saale river

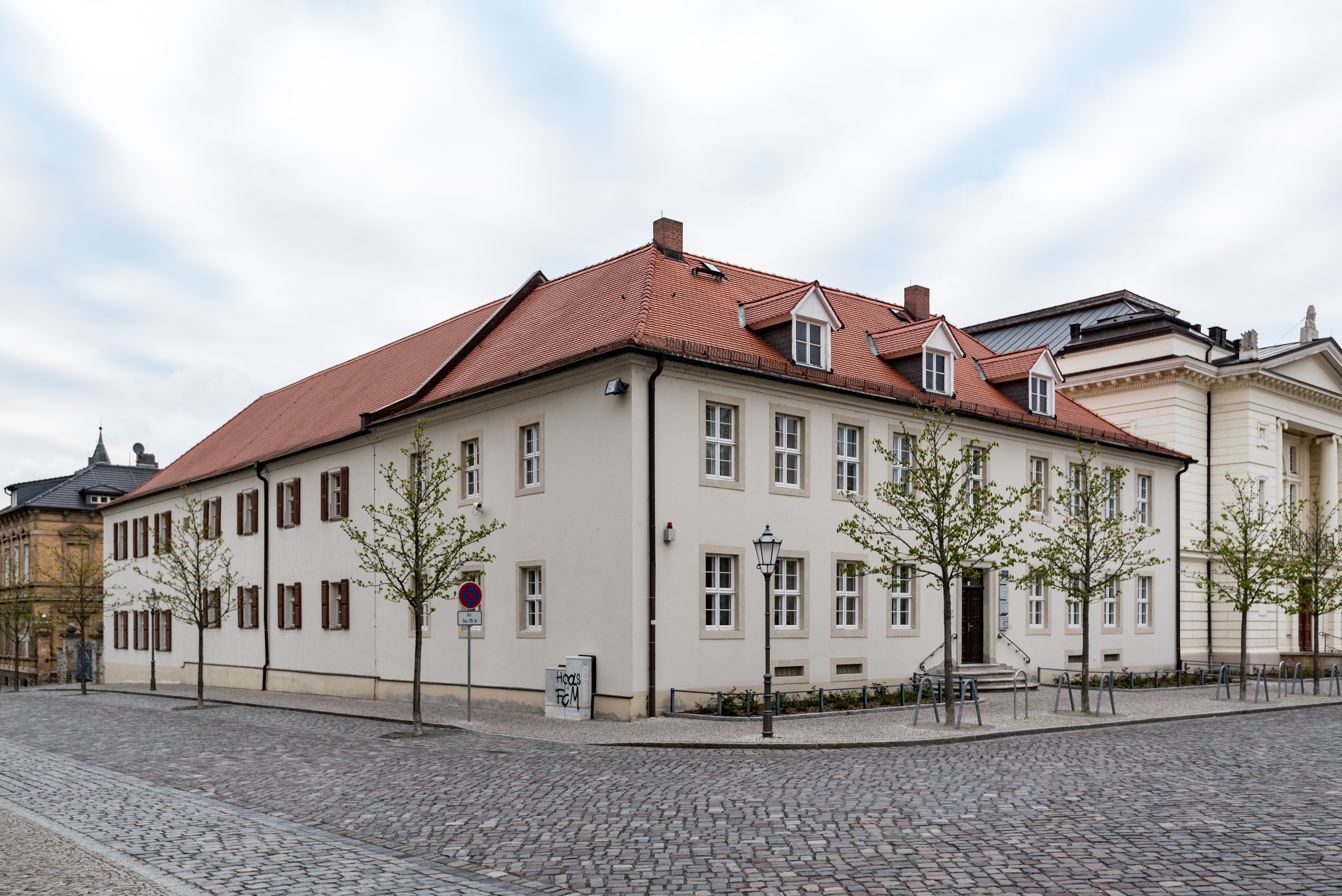
Schlossstraße (inner city)

== Twin towns – sister cities ==
Bernburg is twinned with:

- Anderson, United States (1998)
- Fourmies, France (1967)
- Rheine, Germany (1990)
- Tarnowskie Góry, Poland (1983)
- Chomutov, Czech Republic (1992)

== Notable people ==
=== Honorary citizen ===
Date of award

- April 10, 1890: Otto von Bismarck (1815–1898)
- April 7, 1937 – March 26, 1946: Hermann Göring (1893–1946)
- June 12, 1938 – March 26, 1946: Johann Ludwig Graf Schwerin von Krosigk (1887–1977)

All appointments of honorary citizens and the like from 1933 to 1945 were annulled.

- February 24, 1950: Johannes R. Becher (1891–1958)
- February 19, 1953: Hermann Henselmann (1905–1995)
- February 5, 1967 – ?: Hilde Benjamin (1902–1989)

=== Sons and daughters of the city ===
- Christoph Rothmann (1550–1600), mathematician and astronomer of the 16th century
- Sibylla of Anhalt (1564–1614), Duchess of Württemberg
- Wilhelm Heinrich Sebastian Bucholz (1734–1798), official physician
- Heinrich Friedrich von Diez (1751–1817), diplomat and orientalist
- Isaak Markus Jost (1793–1860), historian

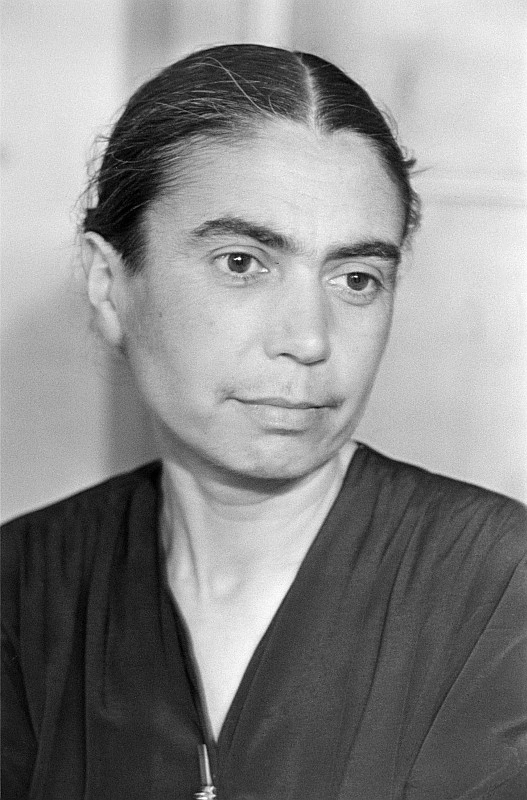
Hilde Benjamin

- Ferdinand Reich (1799–1882), chemist and physicist
- Herrman S. Saroni (1824–1900), writer, composer and inventor
- Hans Reinowski (1900–1977), politician
- Herbert Weißbach (1901–1995), actor
- Ernst Busch (1900–1980), East German singer and actor, Busch was awarded the Lenin Peace Prize for 1970–71
- Hilde Benjamin (1902–1989), presiding judge in a series of political trials in the 1950s and Justice Minister of the GDR
- Ruth Lange (1908–1994), shot putter and discus thrower
- Lykke Aresin (1921– 2011), sexologist and writer
- Otto Knefler (1923–1986), soccer coach and player
- Gerhard Dünnhaupt (1927–2024), bibliographer and cultural historian
- Michael Müller (born 1948), politician
- Rolf Milser (born 1951), weight lifter
- Heike Hartwig (born 1962), athlete
- Ingo Weißenborn (born 1963), fencer

=== People who have worked on the ground ===
- Christian II, Prince of Anhalt-Bernburg (1767–1834), Prince and Duke of Anhalt-Bernburg
- Friedrich Adolf Krummacher (1767–1845), theologian, general superintendent in Bernburg 1812–1824

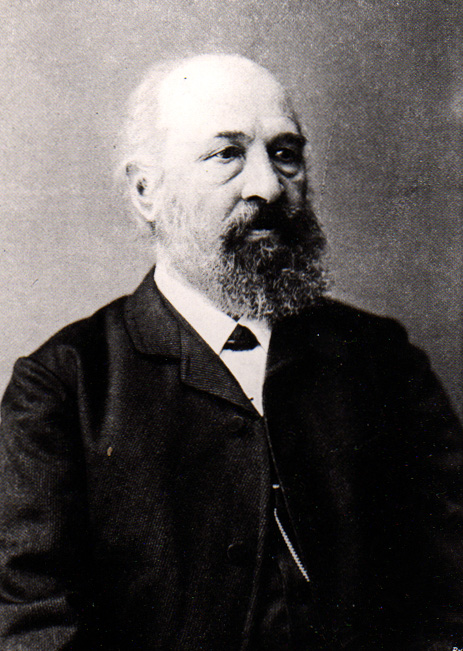
Hermann Hellriegel

- Wilhelm von Kügelgen (1802–1867), early-romantic painter and author, in the service of the court of Bernburg
- Richard Wagner (1813–1883), worked in 1834 in the Bernburg Hoftheater (Mozart operas)
- Hermann Hellriegel (1831–1895), biologist and agricultural scientist in Bernburg 1880–1895
- Wilhelm Krüger (1857–1947), 25 years director of the agricultural test station Bernburg

== See also ==
- Bernburg Euthanasia Centre
- Wacker Bernburg (1910–1945)
