= Latdorf =

- Stadtteil of Nienburg
- Interactive map of Latdorf
- Location within Germany Location within Saxony-Anhalt
- Coordinates: 51°48′N 11°48′E
- Country: Germany
- State: Saxony-Anhalt
- District: Salzlandkreis
- Town: Nienburg

Area
  - Total: 9.16 km^{2} (3.54 sq mi)
- Elevation: 77 m (253 ft)

Population (2006-12-31)
  - Total: 760
  - Density: 83/km^{2} (210/sq mi)
- Time zone: UTC+01:00 (CET)
  - Summer (DST): UTC+02:00 (CEST)
- Postal codes: 06408
- Dialling codes: 03471

Latdorf is a village and a former municipality in the district Salzlandkreis, in Saxony-Anhalt, Germany. Since 1 January 2010, it is part of the town Nienburg.
