= Trinum =

- Ortsteil of Osternienburger Land
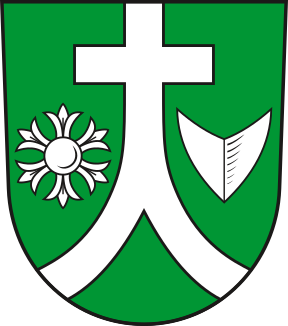
- Coat of arms
- Interactive map of Trinum
- Location within Germany Location within Saxony-Anhalt
- Coordinates: 51°46′19.35″N 11°54′39.17″E
- Country: Germany
- State: Saxony-Anhalt
- District: Anhalt-Bitterfeld
- Municipality: Osternienburger Land

Area
  - Total: 4.34 km^{2} (1.68 sq mi)
- Elevation: 85 m (279 ft)

Population (2006-12-31)
  - Total: 412
  - Density: 94.9/km^{2} (246/sq mi)
- Time zone: UTC+01:00 (CET)
  - Summer (DST): UTC+02:00 (CEST)
- Postal codes: 06369
- Dialling codes: 03496
- Vehicle registration: ABI

Trinum (German pronunciation: [ˈtʁiːnʊm]) is a village and a former municipality in the district of Anhalt-Bitterfeld, in Saxony-Anhalt, Germany.

Since 1 January 2010, it is part of the municipality Osternienburger Land.
