= Peißen, Salzland =

Peißen
- Stadtteil of Bernburg
- Interactive map of Peißen
- Location within Germany Location within Saxony-Anhalt
- Coordinates: 51°45′N 11°46′E
- Country: Germany
- State: Saxony-Anhalt
- District: Salzlandkreis
- Town: Bernburg

Area
  - Total: 9.68 km^{2} (3.74 sq mi)
- Elevation: 69 m (226 ft)

Population (2006-12-31)
  - Total: 1,244
  - Density: 129/km^{2} (333/sq mi)
- Time zone: UTC+01:00 (CET)
  - Summer (DST): UTC+02:00 (CEST)
- Postal codes: 06406
- Dialling codes: 03471

Peißen (German pronunciation: [ˈpaɪsn̩]) is a village and a former municipality in the district Salzlandkreis, in Saxony-Anhalt, Germany.

Since 1 January 2010, it is part of the town Bernburg.
