= Großpaschleben =

- Ortsteil of Osternienburger Land
- Coat of arms
- Interactive map of Großpaschleben
- Location within Germany Location within Saxony-Anhalt
- Coordinates: 51°45′N 11°56′E
- Country: Germany
- State: Saxony-Anhalt
- District: Anhalt-Bitterfeld
- Municipality: Osternienburger Land

Area
  - Total: 9.60 km^{2} (3.71 sq mi)
- Elevation: 86 m (282 ft)

Population (2006-12-31)
  - Total: 869
  - Density: 90.5/km^{2} (234/sq mi)
- Time zone: UTC+01:00 (CET)
  - Summer (DST): UTC+02:00 (CEST)
- Postal codes: 06386
- Dialling codes: 03496
- Vehicle registration: ABI

Großpaschleben (German pronunciation: [ˌɡʁoːsˈpaʃleːbn̩]) is a village and a former municipality in the district of Anhalt-Bitterfeld, in Saxony-Anhalt, Germany.

Since January 1, 2010, it is part of the municipality Osternienburger Land.

== History ==
The community was first mentioned in a document in 1159. A noble family that died out towards the end of the 14th century was named after the village. From 1602 Großpaschleben was the property of the von Wuthenau family, who built a castle surrounded by a pond here in 1706.

On 15 April 1945 there was heavy shelling by US - Artillery of the town and fighting in which 26 of the Infantry Division Potsdam and an unknown number of American soldiers were killed.

The German dead were buried at the cemetery at Wülknitzer Str. 2 in a collective grave.
