= Kleinpaschleben =

- Ortsteil of Osternienburger Land
- Coat of arms
- Interactive map of Kleinpaschleben
- Location within Germany Location within Saxony-Anhalt
- Coordinates: 51°47′N 11°53′E
- Country: Germany
- State: Saxony-Anhalt
- District: Anhalt-Bitterfeld
- Municipality: Osternienburger Land

Area
  - Total: 13.98 km^{2} (5.40 sq mi)
- Elevation: 72 m (236 ft)

Population (2006-12-31)
  - Total: 949
  - Density: 67.9/km^{2} (176/sq mi)
- Time zone: UTC+01:00 (CET)
  - Summer (DST): UTC+02:00 (CEST)
- Postal codes: 06369
- Dialling codes: 034979

Kleinpaschleben (German pronunciation: [ˌklaɪnˈpaʃleːbn̩]) is a village and a former municipality in the district of Anhalt-Bitterfeld, in Saxony-Anhalt, Germany.

Since 1 January 2010, it is part of the municipality Osternienburger Land.
