= Baalberge =

- Stadtteil of Bernburg
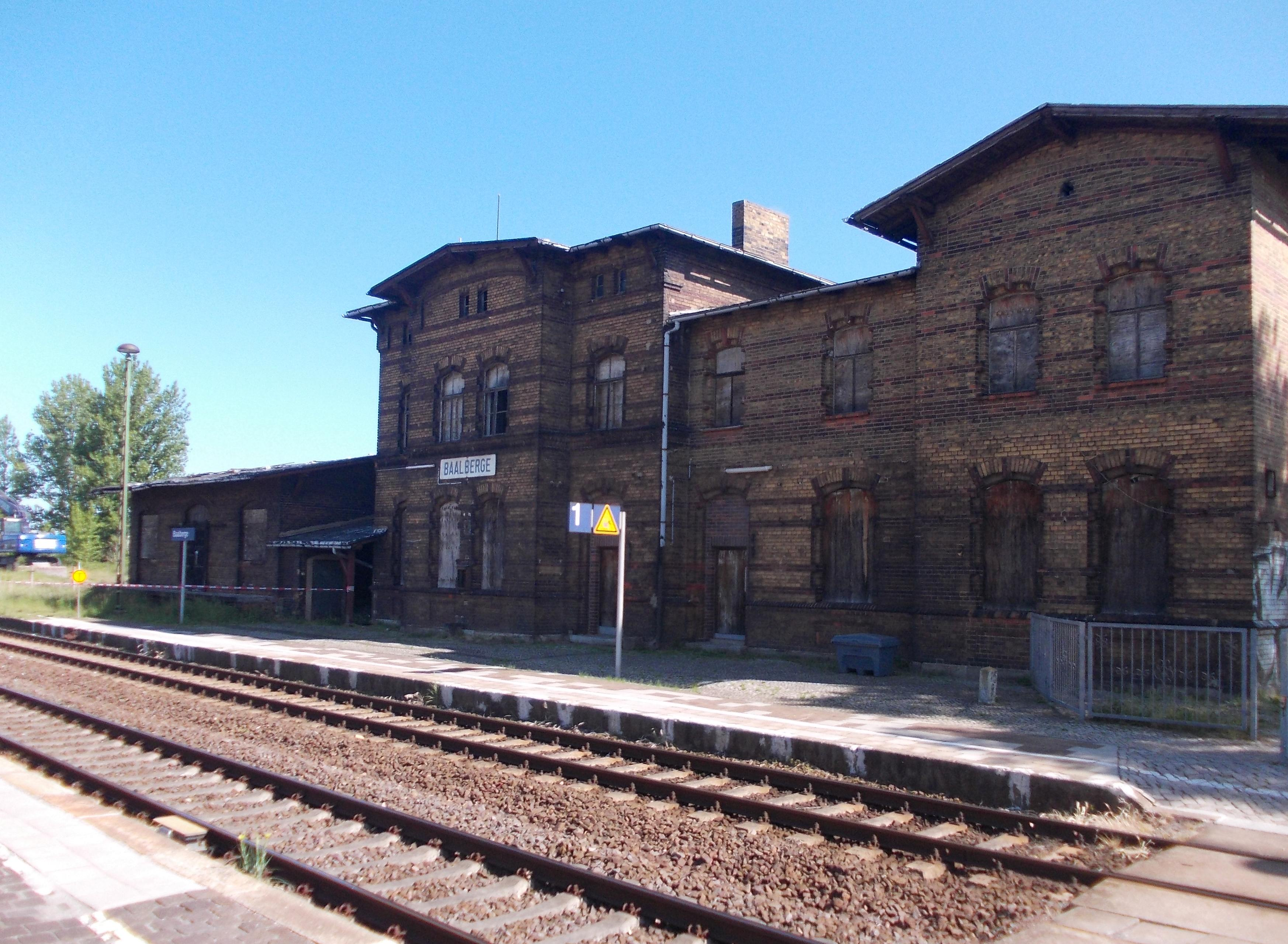
- Baalberge train station

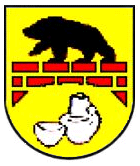
- Coat of arms
- Interactive map of Baalberge
- Location within Germany Location within Saxony-Anhalt
- Coordinates: 51°46′N 11°48′E
- Country: Germany
- State: Saxony-Anhalt
- District: Salzlandkreis
- Town: Bernburg

Area
  - Total: 9.64 km^{2} (3.72 sq mi)
- Elevation: 72 m (236 ft)

Population (2006-12-31)
  - Total: 1,405
  - Density: 146/km^{2} (377/sq mi)
- Time zone: UTC+01:00 (CET)
  - Summer (DST): UTC+02:00 (CEST)
- Postal codes: 06408
- Dialling codes: 03471

Baalberge (German pronunciation: [baːlˈbɛʁɡə]) is a village and a former municipality in the district Salzlandkreis, in Saxony-Anhalt, Germany.

Since 1 January 2010, it is part of the town Bernburg.
