= Preußlitz =

- Stadtteil of Bernburg
- Interactive map of Preußlitz
- Location within Germany Location within Saxony-Anhalt
- Coordinates: 51°44′N 11°49′E
- Country: Germany
- State: Saxony-Anhalt
- District: Salzlandkreis
- Town: Bernburg

Area
  - Total: 9.17 km^{2} (3.54 sq mi)
- Elevation: 67 m (220 ft)

Population (2006-12-31)
  - Total: 756
  - Density: 82.4/km^{2} (214/sq mi)
- Time zone: UTC+01:00 (CET)
  - Summer (DST): UTC+02:00 (CEST)
- Postal codes: 06408
- Dialling codes: 034722

Preußlitz (German pronunciation: [ˈpʁɔʏslɪts]) is a village and a former municipality in the district Salzlandkreis, in Saxony-Anhalt, Germany. Since 1 January 2010, it is part of the town Bernburg.
