= Osternienburg =

- Ortsteil of Osternienburger Land
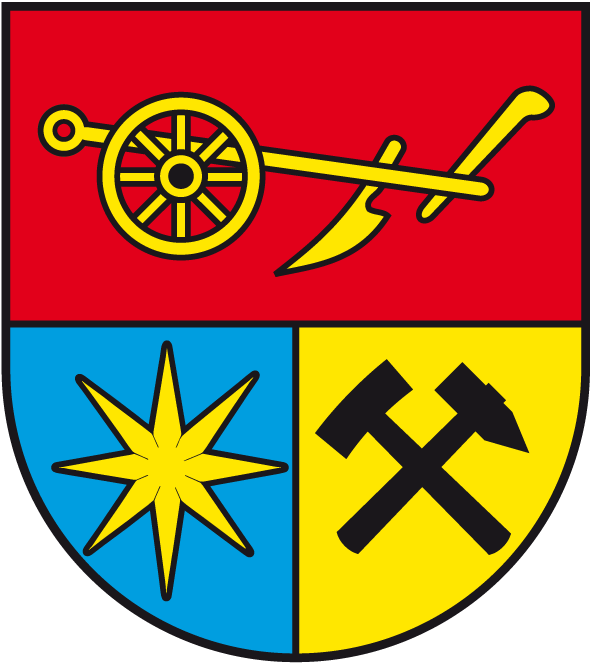
- Coat of arms
- Interactive map of Osternienburg
- Location within Germany Location within Saxony-Anhalt
- Coordinates: 51°48′N 12°2′E
- Country: Germany
- State: Saxony-Anhalt
- District: Anhalt-Bitterfeld
- Municipality: Osternienburger Land

Area
  - Total: 12.66 km^{2} (4.89 sq mi)
- Elevation: 67 m (220 ft)

Population (2016)
  - Total: 1,839
  - Density: 145.3/km^{2} (376.2/sq mi)
- Time zone: UTC+01:00 (CET)
  - Summer (DST): UTC+02:00 (CEST)
- Postal codes: 06386
- Dialling codes: 034973
- Website: www.vg-osternienburg.de

Osternienburg (German pronunciation: [ˌoːstɐˈniːnbʊʁk]) is a village and a former municipality in the district of Anhalt-Bitterfeld, in Saxony-Anhalt, Germany. Since 1 January 2010, it is part of the municipality Osternienburger Land.

It is situated approximately 6 km northeast of Köthen (Anhalt), and 15 km west of Dessau-Rosslau.
