= Biendorf, Saxony-Anhalt =

Biendorf
- Stadtteil of Bernburg
- Interactive map of Biendorf
- Location within Germany Location within Saxony-Anhalt
- Coordinates: 51°45′N 11°51′E
- Country: Germany
- State: Saxony-Anhalt
- District: Salzlandkreis
- Town: Bernburg

Area
  - Total: 4.75 km^{2} (1.83 sq mi)
- Elevation: 79 m (259 ft)

Population (2006-12-31)
  - Total: 820
  - Density: 170/km^{2} (450/sq mi)
- Time zone: UTC+01:00 (CET)
  - Summer (DST): UTC+02:00 (CEST)
- Postal codes: 06408
- Dialling codes: 034722

Biendorf (German pronunciation: [ˈbiːndɔʁf]) is a village and a former municipality in the district Salzlandkreis, in Saxony-Anhalt, Germany.

Since 1 January 2010, it is part of the town Bernburg.
