= Harz (electoral district) =

Federal electoral district of Germany

68 Harz
- Electoral district for the Bundestag
- Harz in 2025
- State: Saxony-Anhalt
- Population: 248,200 (2019)
- Electorate: 207,942 (2021)
- Major settlements: Halberstadt; Wernigerode; Aschersleben
- Area: 2,339.9 km^{2}

Current electoral district
- Created: 1990
- Party: AfD
- Member: Christina Baum
- Elected: 2025

Harz is an electoral constituency (German: Wahlkreis) represented in the Bundestag. It elects one member via first-past-the-post voting. Under the current constituency numbering system, it is designated as constituency 68. It is located in western Saxony-Anhalt, comprising the district of Harz.

Harz was created for the inaugural 1990 federal election after German reunification. From 2009 to 2025, it was represented by Heike Brehmer of the Christian Democratic Union (CDU). Since 2025 it has been represented by Christina Baum of the AfD.

== Geography ==
Harz is located in western Saxony-Anhalt. As of the 2021 federal election, it comprises the entirety of the Harz district as well as the municipalities of Aschersleben and Seeland from the Salzlandkreis district.

== History ==
Harz was created after German reunification in 1990, then known as Harz and Vorharzgebiet. It acquired its current name in the 2002 election. In the 1990 through 1998 elections, it was constituency 285 in the numbering system. In the 2002 and 2005 elections, it was number 68. In the 2009 election, it was number 69. Since the 2013 election, it has been number 68.

Originally, the constituency comprised the districts of Wernigerode, Oschersleben, and Halberstadt. In the 2002 and 2005 elections, it comprised the districts of Halberstadt, Quedlinburg, and Wernigerode. It acquired its current configuration and borders in the 2009 election.

Election	No.	Name	Borders
1990	285	Harz and Vorharzgebiet	Halberstadt district; Oschersleben district; Wernigerode district
1994	285	Harz and Vorharzgebiet	Halberstadt district; Oschersleben district; Wernigerode district
1998	285	Harz and Vorharzgebiet	Halberstadt district; Oschersleben district; Wernigerode district
2002	68	Harz	Halberstadt district; Quedlinburg district; Wernigerode district
2005	68	Harz	Halberstadt district; Quedlinburg district; Wernigerode district
2009	69	Harz	Harz district; Salzlandkreis district (only Aschersleben and Seeland municipalities)
2013	68	Harz	Harz district; Salzlandkreis district (only Aschersleben and Seeland municipalities)
2017	68	Harz	Harz district; Salzlandkreis district (only Aschersleben and Seeland municipalities)
2021	68	Harz	Harz district; Salzlandkreis district (only Aschersleben and Seeland municipalities)
2025	68	Harz	Harz district; Salzlandkreis district (only Aschersleben and Seeland municipalities)

== Members ==
The constituency was first represented by Monika Brudlewsky of the Christian Democratic Union (CDU) from 1990 to 1998. Tobias Marhold of the Social Democratic Party (SPD) was elected in 1998 and served until 2005, followed by Andreas Steppuhn until 2009. Heike Brehmer of the CDU became representative in 2009, and was re-elected in 2013, 2017, and 2021.

Election	Member	Party	%
1990	Monika Brudlewsky	CDU	43.7
1994	Monika Brudlewsky	CDU	40.9
1998	Tobias Marhold	SPD	44.1
2002	Tobias Marhold	SPD	44.9
2005	Andreas Steppuhn	SPD	33.8
2009	Heike Brehmer	CDU	33.0
2013	Heike Brehmer	CDU	46.0
2017	Heike Brehmer	CDU	36.4
2021	Heike Brehmer	CDU	27.7
2025	Christina Baum	AfD	39.0

== Election results ==
=== 2025 election ===
Federal election (2025): Harz
Notes:	Blue background denotes the winner of the electorate vote. Pink background denotes a candidate elected from their party list. Yellow background denotes an electorate win by a list member, or other incumbent. A ✓ or ✗ denotes status of any incumbent, win or lose respectively.						
Party	Candidate	Votes	%	±%	Party votes	%	±%
AfD	Christina Baum	59,306	39.0	▲20.8	56,490	37.0	▲18.9
CDU	Artjom Pusch	35,708	23.5	▼4.2	29,903	19.6	▼2.7
BSW					17,890	11.7	New
SPD	Florian Fahrtmann	21,243	14.0	▼11.5	17,601	11.5	▼15.7
Left	Karsten Lippmann	18,076	11.9	▲1.4	15,487	10.1	▲0.9
Greens	Kathrin Grub	4,958	3.3	▼1.4	5,858	3.8	▼1.6
FW	André Weber	4,377	2.9	▼0.8	2,180	1.4	▼0.6
FDP	Max Schröder	3,405	2.2	▼5.1	4,178	2.7	▼6.4
BD	Kathrin Schreck	2,618	1.7	New	834	0.5	New
PARTEI	Daniel Lüdemann-Johr	2,332	1.5	New	1,528	1.0	▲0.3
Volt					721	0.5	▲0.3
MLPD					153	0.1	0.0
Informal votes		2,049			1,249		
Total valid votes		152,023			152,823		
Turnout		154,072	77.0	▲10.3			
AfD gain from CDU	Majority	23,598	15.5	N/A			

=== 2021 election ===
Federal election (2021): Harz
Notes:	Blue background denotes the winner of the electorate vote. Pink background denotes a candidate elected from their party list. Yellow background denotes an electorate win by a list member, or other incumbent. A ✓ or ✗ denotes status of any incumbent, win or lose respectively.						
Party	Candidate	Votes	%	±%	Party votes	%	±%
CDU	✓ Heike Brehmer	37,884	27.7	▼8.7	30,508	22.3	▼11.4
SPD	Maik Berger	34,812	25.4	▲7.9	37,330	27.2	▲11.0
AfD	Sören Stefanowicz	24,947	18.2	▲2.1	24,790	18.1	▲1.2
Left	Karsten Lippmann	14,413	10.5	▼8.7	12,700	9.3	▼8.4
FDP	Denise Köcke	10,064	7.4	▲2.4	12,532	9.1	▲2.1
Greens	Wolfgang Strauhs	6,320	4.6	▲1.5	7,495	5.5	▲2.0
FW	Carlo Gottschalk	4,972	3.6	▲1.3	2,840	2.1	▲0.9
dieBasis	Uwe Rohrbeck	3,160	2.3		2,621	1.9	
Tierschutzpartei					1,736	1.3	
Tierschutzallianz					1,480	1.1	▼0.5
PARTEI					934	0.7	▼0.3
Gartenpartei					758	0.6	▲0.2
Pirates					435	0.3	
NPD					296	0.2	▼0.4
Independent	Thomas Barth	272	0.2				
Volt					178	0.1	
Humanists					129	0.1	
du.					119	0.1	
MLPD					91	0.1	▼0.1
ÖDP					78	0.1	
Informal votes		1,728			1,522		
Total valid votes		136,844			137,050		
Turnout		138,572	66.6	▲0.1			
CDU hold	Majority	3,072	2.3	▼14.9			

=== 2017 election ===
Federal election (2017): Harz
Notes:	Blue background denotes the winner of the electorate vote. Pink background denotes a candidate elected from their party list. Yellow background denotes an electorate win by a list member, or other incumbent. A ✓ or ✗ denotes status of any incumbent, win or lose respectively.						
Party	Candidate	Votes	%	±%	Party votes	%	±%
CDU	✓ Heike Brehmer	51,386	36.4	▼9.6	47,574	33.6	▼9.9
Left	Evelyn Edler	27,104	19.2	▼3.8	25,069	17.7	▼5.2
SPD	Eberhard Brecht (Note: Brecht entered the Bundestag on the SPD list after the resignation of Burkhard Lischka in October 2019.)	24,767	17.5	▼1.6	22,915	16.2	▼2.6
AfD	Frank-Ronald Bischoff	22,792	16.1		23,860	16.9	▲13.1
FDP	Denise Köcke	6,923	4.9	▲3.5	9,902	7.0	▲4.7
Greens	Susan Sziborra-Seidlitz	4,462	3.2	▼0.6	4,968	3.5	▼0.1
FW	Dieter Kühn	3,253	2.3	▲1.5	1,648	1.2	▲0.5
Tierschutzallianz					2,176	1.5	
PARTEI					1,344	0.9	
NPD					868	0.6	▼1.4
MG					445	0.3	
BGE					365	0.3	
DiB					213	0.2	
MLPD	Frank Oettler	441	0.3		184	0.1	0.0
Informal votes		2,439			2,036		
Total valid votes		141,128			141,531		
Turnout		143,567	66.6	▲7.7			
CDU hold	Majority	24,282	17.2	▼5.8			

=== 2013 election ===
Federal election (2013): Harz
Notes:	Blue background denotes the winner of the electorate vote. Pink background denotes a candidate elected from their party list. Yellow background denotes an electorate win by a list member, or other incumbent. A ✓ or ✗ denotes status of any incumbent, win or lose respectively.						
Party	Candidate	Votes	%	±%	Party votes	%	±%
CDU	✓ Heike Brehmer	59,779	46.0	▲13.0	56,619	43.5	▲12.1
Left	Elke Reinke	29,860	23.0	▼8.1	29,875	22.9	▼9.3
SPD	Mario Hennig	24,875	19.1	▼1.2	24,407	18.7	▲1.6
AfD					4,924	3.8	
Greens	Sabine Wetzel	4,928	3.8	▼1.7	4,716	3.6	▼1.4
NPD	Michael Grunzel	3,304	2.5	▼0.2	2,651	2.0	▼0.3
Pirates	Henning Lübbers	2,556	2.0		2,255	1.7	▼0.3
FDP	Detlef Ebert	1,852	1.4	▼5.8	2,961	2.3	▼7.1
Tierschutzpartei					1,679	1.3	
FW	Ethel-Maria Muschalle-Höllbach	1,111	0.9		929	0.7	
PRO					433	0.3	
ÖDP					293	0.2	
MLPD					136	0.1	▼0.1
Informal votes		2,595			2,340		
Total valid votes		129,944			130,199		
Turnout		132,539	58.9	▼2.0			
CDU hold	Majority	29,919	23.0	▲21.1			

=== 2009 election ===
Federal election (2009): Harz
Notes:	Blue background denotes the winner of the electorate vote. Pink background denotes a candidate elected from their party list. Yellow background denotes an electorate win by a list member, or other incumbent. A ✓ or ✗ denotes status of any incumbent, win or lose respectively.						
Party	Candidate	Votes	%	±%	Party votes	%	±%
CDU	Heike Brehmer	46,632	33.0	▲6.0	44,402	31.3	▲6.4
Left	Elke Reinke	43,952	31.1	▲4.8	45,676	32.2	▲5.9
SPD	Andreas Steppuhn	28,732	20.3	▼14.0	24,320	17.2	▼16.7
FDP	Wolfgang Döcke	10,236	7.2	▲1.9	13,274	9.4	▲2.0
Greens	Undine Kurth	7,791	5.5	▲1.7	7,141	5.0	▲1.2
NPD	Matthias Heyder	3,862	2.7	▼0.2	3,277	2.3	▼0.2
Pirates					2,897	2.0	
DVU					345	0.2	
MLPD					309	0.2	0.0
Informal votes		3,135			2,699		
Total valid votes		141,205			141,641		
Turnout		144,340	60.9	▼10.2			
CDU gain from SPD	Majority	2,680	1.9				

=== 2005 election ===
Federal election (2005):Harz
Notes:	Blue background denotes the winner of the electorate vote. Pink background denotes a candidate elected from their party list. Yellow background denotes an electorate win by a list member, or other incumbent. A ✓ or ✗ denotes status of any incumbent, win or lose respectively.						
Party	Candidate	Votes	%	±%	Party votes	%	±%
SPD	Andreas Steppuhn	48,294	33.8	▼11.1	48,867	34.1	▼10.8
CDU	Markus Gorges	39,096	27.4	▼2.3	36,425	34.1	▼10.8
Left	Detlef Eckert	37,293	26.1	▲12.1	26,936	25.8	▲13.0
FDP	Andreas Pawel	7,847	5.5	▼1.9	10,396	7.2	▼0.4
Greens	Undine Kurth	6,049	4.2	▲0.8	5,562	3.9	▲0.5
NPD	Matthias Brink	4,135	2.9	▲1.8	3,594	2.5	▲1.5
Pro German Center – Pro D-Mark Initiative					612	0.4	
REP					483	0.3	
MLPD					321	0.2	
Schill					141	0.1	
Informal votes		3,752			3,039		
Total valid votes		142,714			143,427		
Turnout		146,466	71.3	▲1.6			
SPD hold	Majority	9,198	6.4				
