= NUTS statistical regions of Germany =

Statistical regions of Germany

The Nomenclature of Territorial Units for Statistics (NUTS) is a geocode standard for referencing the subdivisions of Germany for statistical purposes. The standard is developed and regulated by the European Union. The NUTS standard is instrumental in delivering the European Union's Structural Funds. The NUTS code for Germany is DE and a hierarchy of three levels is established by Eurostat. Below these is a further levels of geographic organisation – the local administrative unit (LAU). In Germany the LAUs 1 is collective municipalities, and the LAU 2 is municipalities.

== Overall ==
Level	Subdivisions	#
NUTS 1	States (Länder)	16
NUTS 2	Government regions (Regierungsbezirke) (or equivalent)	38
NUTS 3	Districts (Kreise)	400
LAU 1	Collective municipalities (Verwaltungsgemeinschaften)	1344
LAU 2	Municipalities (Gemeinden)	10753

== NUTS codes ==
NUTS 1	Code	NUTS 2	Code	NUTS 3	Code
Baden-Württemberg	DE1	Stuttgart	DE11	Stuttgart, Stadtkreis	DE111
Baden-Württemberg	DE1	Stuttgart	DE11	Böblingen	DE112
Baden-Württemberg	DE1	Stuttgart	DE11	Esslingen	DE113
Baden-Württemberg	DE1	Stuttgart	DE11	Göppingen	DE114
Baden-Württemberg	DE1	Stuttgart	DE11	Ludwigsburg	DE115
Baden-Württemberg	DE1	Stuttgart	DE11	Rems-Murr-Kreis	DE116
Baden-Württemberg	DE1	Stuttgart	DE11	Heilbronn, Stadtkreis	DE117
Baden-Württemberg	DE1	Stuttgart	DE11	Heilbronn, Landkreis	DE118
Baden-Württemberg	DE1	Stuttgart	DE11	Hohenlohekreis	DE119
Baden-Württemberg	DE1	Stuttgart	DE11	Schwäbisch Hall	DE11A
Baden-Württemberg	DE1	Stuttgart	DE11	Main-Tauber-Kreis	DE11B
Baden-Württemberg	DE1	Stuttgart	DE11	Heidenheim	DE11C
Baden-Württemberg	DE1	Stuttgart	DE11	Ostalbkreis	DE11D
Baden-Württemberg	DE1	Karlsruhe	DE12	Baden-Baden, Stadtkreis	DE121
Baden-Württemberg	DE1	Karlsruhe	DE12	Karlsruhe, Stadtkreis	DE122
Baden-Württemberg	DE1	Karlsruhe	DE12	Karlsruhe, Landkreis	DE123
Baden-Württemberg	DE1	Karlsruhe	DE12	Rastatt	DE124
Baden-Württemberg	DE1	Karlsruhe	DE12	Heidelberg, Stadtkreis	DE125
Baden-Württemberg	DE1	Karlsruhe	DE12	Mannheim, Stadtkreis	DE126
Baden-Württemberg	DE1	Karlsruhe	DE12	Neckar-Odenwald-Kreis	DE127
Baden-Württemberg	DE1	Karlsruhe	DE12	Rhein-Neckar-Kreis	DE128
Baden-Württemberg	DE1	Karlsruhe	DE12	Pforzheim, Stadtkreis	DE129
Baden-Württemberg	DE1	Karlsruhe	DE12	Calw	DE12A
Baden-Württemberg	DE1	Karlsruhe	DE12	Enzkreis	DE12B
Baden-Württemberg	DE1	Karlsruhe	DE12	Freudenstadt	DE12C
Baden-Württemberg	DE1	Freiburg	DE13	Freiburg im Breisgau, Stadtkreis	DE131
Baden-Württemberg	DE1	Freiburg	DE13	Breisgau-Hochschwarzwald	DE132
Baden-Württemberg	DE1	Freiburg	DE13	Emmendingen	DE133
Baden-Württemberg	DE1	Freiburg	DE13	Ortenaukreis	DE134
Baden-Württemberg	DE1	Freiburg	DE13	Rottweil	DE135
Baden-Württemberg	DE1	Freiburg	DE13	Schwarzwald-Baar-Kreis	DE136
Baden-Württemberg	DE1	Freiburg	DE13	Tuttlingen	DE137
Baden-Württemberg	DE1	Freiburg	DE13	Konstanz	DE138
Baden-Württemberg	DE1	Freiburg	DE13	Lörrach	DE139
Baden-Württemberg	DE1	Freiburg	DE13	Waldshut	DE13A
Baden-Württemberg	DE1	Tübingen	DE14	Reutlingen	DE141
Baden-Württemberg	DE1	Tübingen	DE14	Tübingen, Landkreis	DE142
Baden-Württemberg	DE1	Tübingen	DE14	Zollernalbkreis	DE143
Baden-Württemberg	DE1	Tübingen	DE14	Ulm, Stadtkreis	DE144
Baden-Württemberg	DE1	Tübingen	DE14	Alb-Donau-Kreis	DE145
Baden-Württemberg	DE1	Tübingen	DE14	Biberach	DE146
Baden-Württemberg	DE1	Tübingen	DE14	Bodenseekreis	DE147
Baden-Württemberg	DE1	Tübingen	DE14	Ravensburg	DE148
Baden-Württemberg	DE1	Tübingen	DE14	Sigmaringen	DE149
Bavaria	DE2	Oberbayern	DE21	Ingolstadt, Kreisfreie Stadt	DE211
Bavaria	DE2	Oberbayern	DE21	München, Kreisfreie Stadt	DE212
Bavaria	DE2	Oberbayern	DE21	Rosenheim, Kreisfreie Stadt	DE213
Bavaria	DE2	Oberbayern	DE21	Altötting	DE214
Bavaria	DE2	Oberbayern	DE21	Berchtesgadener Land	DE215
Bavaria	DE2	Oberbayern	DE21	Bad Tölz-Wolfratshausen	DE216
Bavaria	DE2	Oberbayern	DE21	Dachau	DE217
Bavaria	DE2	Oberbayern	DE21	Ebersberg	DE218
Bavaria	DE2	Oberbayern	DE21	Eichstätt	DE219
Bavaria	DE2	Oberbayern	DE21	Erding	DE21A
Bavaria	DE2	Oberbayern	DE21	Freising	DE21B
Bavaria	DE2	Oberbayern	DE21	Fürstenfeldbruck	DE21C
Bavaria	DE2	Oberbayern	DE21	Garmisch-Partenkirchen	DE21D
Bavaria	DE2	Oberbayern	DE21	Landsberg am Lech	DE21E
Bavaria	DE2	Oberbayern	DE21	Miesbach	DE21F
Bavaria	DE2	Oberbayern	DE21	Mühldorf a. Inn	DE21G
Bavaria	DE2	Oberbayern	DE21	München, Landkreis	DE21H
Bavaria	DE2	Oberbayern	DE21	Neuburg-Schrobenhausen	DE21I
Bavaria	DE2	Oberbayern	DE21	Pfaffenhofen a. d. Ilm	DE21J
Bavaria	DE2	Oberbayern	DE21	Rosenheim, Landkreis	DE21K
Bavaria	DE2	Oberbayern	DE21	Starnberg	DE21L
Bavaria	DE2	Oberbayern	DE21	Traunstein	DE21M
Bavaria	DE2	Oberbayern	DE21	Weilheim-Schongau	DE21N
Bavaria	DE2	Niederbayern	DE22	Landshut, Kreisfreie Stadt	DE221
Bavaria	DE2	Niederbayern	DE22	Passau, Kreisfreie Stadt	DE222
Bavaria	DE2	Niederbayern	DE22	Straubing, Kreisfreie Stadt	DE223
Bavaria	DE2	Niederbayern	DE22	Deggendorf	DE224
Bavaria	DE2	Niederbayern	DE22	Freyung-Grafenau	DE225
Bavaria	DE2	Niederbayern	DE22	Kelheim	DE226
Bavaria	DE2	Niederbayern	DE22	Landshut, Landkreis	DE227
Bavaria	DE2	Niederbayern	DE22	Passau, Landkreis	DE228
Bavaria	DE2	Niederbayern	DE22	Regen	DE229
Bavaria	DE2	Niederbayern	DE22	Rottal-Inn	DE22A
Bavaria	DE2	Niederbayern	DE22	Straubing-Bogen	DE22B
Bavaria	DE2	Niederbayern	DE22	Dingolfing-Landau	DE22C
Bavaria	DE2	Oberpfalz	DE23	Amberg, Kreisfreie Stadt	DE231
Bavaria	DE2	Oberpfalz	DE23	Regensburg, Kreisfreie Stadt	DE232
Bavaria	DE2	Oberpfalz	DE23	Weiden i. d. Opf, Kreisfreie Stadt	DE233
Bavaria	DE2	Oberpfalz	DE23	Amberg-Sulzbach	DE234
Bavaria	DE2	Oberpfalz	DE23	Cham	DE235
Bavaria	DE2	Oberpfalz	DE23	Neumarkt i. d. OPf.	DE236
Bavaria	DE2	Oberpfalz	DE23	Neustadt a.d.Waldnaab	DE237
Bavaria	DE2	Oberpfalz	DE23	Regensburg, Landkreis	DE238
Bavaria	DE2	Oberpfalz	DE23	Schwandorf	DE239
Bavaria	DE2	Oberpfalz	DE23	Tirschenreuth	DE23A
Bavaria	DE2	Oberfranken	DE24	Bamberg, Kreisfreie Stadt	DE241
Bavaria	DE2	Oberfranken	DE24	Bayreuth, Kreisfreie Stadt	DE242
Bavaria	DE2	Oberfranken	DE24	Coburg, Kreisfreie Stadt	DE243
Bavaria	DE2	Oberfranken	DE24	Hof, Kreisfreie Stadt	DE244
Bavaria	DE2	Oberfranken	DE24	Bamberg, Landkreis	DE245
Bavaria	DE2	Oberfranken	DE24	Bayreuth, Landkreis	DE246
Bavaria	DE2	Oberfranken	DE24	Coburg, Landkreis	DE247
Bavaria	DE2	Oberfranken	DE24	Forchheim	DE248
Bavaria	DE2	Oberfranken	DE24	Hof, Landkreis	DE249
Bavaria	DE2	Oberfranken	DE24	Kronach	DE24A
Bavaria	DE2	Oberfranken	DE24	Kulmbach	DE24B
Bavaria	DE2	Oberfranken	DE24	Lichtenfels	DE24C
Bavaria	DE2	Oberfranken	DE24	Wunsiedel i. Fichtelgebirge	DE24D
Bavaria	DE2	Mittelfranken	DE25	Ansbach, Kreisfreie Stadt	DE251
Bavaria	DE2	Mittelfranken	DE25	Erlangen, Kreisfreie Stadt	DE252
Bavaria	DE2	Mittelfranken	DE25	Fürth, Kreisfreie Stadt	DE253
Bavaria	DE2	Mittelfranken	DE25	Nürnberg, Kreisfreie Stadt	DE254
Bavaria	DE2	Mittelfranken	DE25	Schwabach, Kreisfreie Stadt	DE255
Bavaria	DE2	Mittelfranken	DE25	Ansbach, Landkreis	DE256
Bavaria	DE2	Mittelfranken	DE25	Erlangen-Höchstadt	DE257
Bavaria	DE2	Mittelfranken	DE25	Fürth, Landkreis	DE258
Bavaria	DE2	Mittelfranken	DE25	Nürnberger Land	DE259
Bavaria	DE2	Mittelfranken	DE25	Neustadt a. d. Aisch-Bad Windsheim	DE25A
Bavaria	DE2	Mittelfranken	DE25	Roth	DE25B
Bavaria	DE2	Mittelfranken	DE25	Weißenburg-Gunzenhausen	DE25C
Bavaria	DE2	Unterfranken	DE26	Aschaffenburg, Kreisfreie Stadt	DE261
Bavaria	DE2	Unterfranken	DE26	Schweinfurt, Kreisfreie Stadt	DE262
Bavaria	DE2	Unterfranken	DE26	Würzburg, Kreisfreie Stadt	DE263
Bavaria	DE2	Unterfranken	DE26	Aschaffenburg, Landkreis	DE264
Bavaria	DE2	Unterfranken	DE26	Bad Kissingen	DE265
Bavaria	DE2	Unterfranken	DE26	Rhön-Grabfeld	DE266
Bavaria	DE2	Unterfranken	DE26	Haßberge	DE267
Bavaria	DE2	Unterfranken	DE26	Kitzingen	DE268
Bavaria	DE2	Unterfranken	DE26	Miltenberg	DE269
Bavaria	DE2	Unterfranken	DE26	Main-Spessart	DE26A
Bavaria	DE2	Unterfranken	DE26	Schweinfurt, Landkreis	DE26B
Bavaria	DE2	Unterfranken	DE26	Würzburg, Landkreis	DE26C
Bavaria	DE2	Schwaben	DE27	Augsburg, Kreisfreie Stadt	DE271
Bavaria	DE2	Schwaben	DE27	Kaufbeuren, Kreisfreie Stadt	DE272
Bavaria	DE2	Schwaben	DE27	Kempten (Allgäu), Kreisfreie Stadt	DE273
Bavaria	DE2	Schwaben	DE27	Memmingen, Kreisfreie Stadt	DE274
Bavaria	DE2	Schwaben	DE27	Aichach-Friedberg	DE275
Bavaria	DE2	Schwaben	DE27	Augsburg, Landkreis	DE276
Bavaria	DE2	Schwaben	DE27	Dillingen a.d. Donau	DE277
Bavaria	DE2	Schwaben	DE27	Günzburg	DE278
Bavaria	DE2	Schwaben	DE27	Neu-Ulm	DE279
Bavaria	DE2	Schwaben	DE27	Lindau Bodensee)	DE27A
Bavaria	DE2	Schwaben	DE27	Ostallgäu	DE27B
Bavaria	DE2	Schwaben	DE27	Unterallgäu	DE27C
Bavaria	DE2	Schwaben	DE27	Donau-Ries	DE27D
Bavaria	DE2	Schwaben	DE27	Oberallgäu	DE27E
Berlin	DE3	Berlin	DE30	Berlin	DE300
Brandenburg	DE4	Brandenburg	DE40	Brandenburg an der Havel, Kreisfreie Stadt	DE401
Brandenburg	DE4	Brandenburg	DE40	Cottbus, Kreisfreie Stadt	DE402
Brandenburg	DE4	Brandenburg	DE40	Frankfurt (Oder), Kreisfreie Stadt	DE403
Brandenburg	DE4	Brandenburg	DE40	Potsdam, Kreisfreie Stadt	DE404
Brandenburg	DE4	Brandenburg	DE40	Barnim	DE405
Brandenburg	DE4	Brandenburg	DE40	Dahme-Spreewald	DE406
Brandenburg	DE4	Brandenburg	DE40	Elbe-Elster	DE407
Brandenburg	DE4	Brandenburg	DE40	Havelland	DE408
Brandenburg	DE4	Brandenburg	DE40	Märkisch-Oderland	DE409
Brandenburg	DE4	Brandenburg	DE40	Oberhavel	DE40A
Brandenburg	DE4	Brandenburg	DE40	Oberspreewald-Lausitz	DE40B
Brandenburg	DE4	Brandenburg	DE40	Oder-Spree	DE40C
Brandenburg	DE4	Brandenburg	DE40	Ostprignitz-Ruppin	DE40D
Brandenburg	DE4	Brandenburg	DE40	Potsdam-Mittelmark	DE40E
Brandenburg	DE4	Brandenburg	DE40	Prignitz	DE40F
Brandenburg	DE4	Brandenburg	DE40	Spree-Neiße	DE40G
Brandenburg	DE4	Brandenburg	DE40	Teltow-Fläming	DE40H
Brandenburg	DE4	Brandenburg	DE40	Uckermark	DE40I
Bremen	DE5	Bremen	DE50	Bremen, Kreisfreie Stadt	DE501
Bremen	DE5	Bremen	DE50	Bremerhaven, Kreisfreie Stadt	DE502
Hamburg	DE6	Hamburg	DE60	Hamburg	DE600
Hesse	DE7	Darmstadt	DE71	Darmstadt, Kreisfreie Stadt	DE711
Hesse	DE7	Darmstadt	DE71	Frankfurt am Main, Kreisfreie Stadt	DE712
Hesse	DE7	Darmstadt	DE71	Offenbach am Main, Kreisfreie Stadt	DE713
Hesse	DE7	Darmstadt	DE71	Wiesbaden, Kreisfreie Stadt	DE714
Hesse	DE7	Darmstadt	DE71	Bergstraße	DE715
Hesse	DE7	Darmstadt	DE71	Darmstadt-Dieburg	DE716
Hesse	DE7	Darmstadt	DE71	Groß-Gerau	DE717
Hesse	DE7	Darmstadt	DE71	Hochtaunuskreis	DE718
Hesse	DE7	Darmstadt	DE71	Main-Kinzig-Kreis	DE719
Hesse	DE7	Darmstadt	DE71	Main-Taunus-Kreis	DE71A
Hesse	DE7	Darmstadt	DE71	Odenwaldkreis	DE71B
Hesse	DE7	Darmstadt	DE71	Offenbach, Landkreis	DE71C
Hesse	DE7	Darmstadt	DE71	Rheingau-Taunus-Kreis	DE71D
Hesse	DE7	Darmstadt	DE71	Wetteraukreis	DE71E
Hesse	DE7	Gießen	DE72	Gießen, Landkreis	DE721
Hesse	DE7	Gießen	DE72	Lahn-Dill-Kreis	DE722
Hesse	DE7	Gießen	DE72	Limburg-Weilburg	DE723
Hesse	DE7	Gießen	DE72	Marburg-Biedenkopf	DE724
Hesse	DE7	Gießen	DE72	Vogelsbergkreis	DE725
Hesse	DE7	Kassel	DE73	Kassel, Kreisfreie Stadt	DE731
Hesse	DE7	Kassel	DE73	Fulda	DE732
Hesse	DE7	Kassel	DE73	Hersfeld-Rotenburg	DE733
Hesse	DE7	Kassel	DE73	Kassel, Landkreis	DE734
Hesse	DE7	Kassel	DE73	Schwalm-Eder-Kreis	DE735
Hesse	DE7	Kassel	DE73	Waldeck-Frankenberg	DE736
Hesse	DE7	Kassel	DE73	Werra-Meißner-Kreis	DE737
Mecklenburg-Vorpommern	DE8	Mecklenburg-Vorpommern	DE80	Rostock, Kreisfreie Stadt	DE803
Mecklenburg-Vorpommern	DE8	Mecklenburg-Vorpommern	DE80	Schwerin, Kreisfreie Stadt	DE804
Mecklenburg-Vorpommern	DE8	Mecklenburg-Vorpommern	DE80	Mecklenburgische Seenplatte	DE80J
Mecklenburg-Vorpommern	DE8	Mecklenburg-Vorpommern	DE80	Vorpommern-Greifswald	DE80N
Mecklenburg-Vorpommern	DE8	Mecklenburg-Vorpommern	DE80	Landkreis Rostock	DE80K
Mecklenburg-Vorpommern	DE8	Mecklenburg-Vorpommern	DE80	Vorpommern-Rügen	DE80L
Mecklenburg-Vorpommern	DE8	Mecklenburg-Vorpommern	DE80	Nordwestmecklenburg	DE80M
Mecklenburg-Vorpommern	DE8	Mecklenburg-Vorpommern	DE80	Ludwigslust-Parchim	DE80O
Lower Saxony	DE9	Braunschweig	DE91	Braunschweig, Kreisfreie Stadt	DE911
Lower Saxony	DE9	Braunschweig	DE91	Salzgitter, Kreisfreie Stadt	DE912
Lower Saxony	DE9	Braunschweig	DE91	Wolfsburg, Kreisfreie Stadt	DE913
Lower Saxony	DE9	Braunschweig	DE91	Gifhorn	DE914
Lower Saxony	DE9	Braunschweig	DE91	Goslar	DE916
Lower Saxony	DE9	Braunschweig	DE91	Helmstedt	DE917
Lower Saxony	DE9	Braunschweig	DE91	Northeim	DE918
Lower Saxony	DE9	Braunschweig	DE91	Peine	DE91A
Lower Saxony	DE9	Braunschweig	DE91	Wolfenbüttel	DE91B
Lower Saxony	DE9	Braunschweig	DE91	Göttingen	DE91C
Lower Saxony	DE9	Hannover	DE92	Diepholz	DE922
Lower Saxony	DE9	Hannover	DE92	Hameln-Pyrmont	DE923
Lower Saxony	DE9	Hannover	DE92	Hildesheim	DE925
Lower Saxony	DE9	Hannover	DE92	Holzminden	DE926
Lower Saxony	DE9	Hannover	DE92	Nienburg (Weser)	DE927
Lower Saxony	DE9	Hannover	DE92	Schaumburg	DE928
Lower Saxony	DE9	Hannover	DE92	Region Hannover	DE929
Lower Saxony	DE9	Lüneburg	DE93	Celle	DE931
Lower Saxony	DE9	Lüneburg	DE93	Cuxhaven	DE932
Lower Saxony	DE9	Lüneburg	DE93	Harburg	DE933
Lower Saxony	DE9	Lüneburg	DE93	Lüchow-Dannenberg	DE934
Lower Saxony	DE9	Lüneburg	DE93	Lüneburg, Landkreis	DE935
Lower Saxony	DE9	Lüneburg	DE93	Osterholz	DE936
Lower Saxony	DE9	Lüneburg	DE93	Rotenburg Wümme)	DE937
Lower Saxony	DE9	Lüneburg	DE93	Heidekreis	DE938
Lower Saxony	DE9	Lüneburg	DE93	Stade	DE939
Lower Saxony	DE9	Lüneburg	DE93	Uelzen	DE93A
Lower Saxony	DE9	Lüneburg	DE93	Verden	DE93B
Lower Saxony	DE9	Weser-Ems	DE94	Delmenhorst, Kreisfreie Stadt	DE941
Lower Saxony	DE9	Weser-Ems	DE94	Emden, Kreisfreie Stadt	DE942
Lower Saxony	DE9	Weser-Ems	DE94	Oldenburg, Kreisfreie Stadt	DE943
Lower Saxony	DE9	Weser-Ems	DE94	Osnabrück, Kreisfreie Stadt	DE944
Lower Saxony	DE9	Weser-Ems	DE94	Wilhelmshaven, Kreisfreie Stadt	DE945
Lower Saxony	DE9	Weser-Ems	DE94	Ammerland	DE946
Lower Saxony	DE9	Weser-Ems	DE94	Aurich	DE947
Lower Saxony	DE9	Weser-Ems	DE94	Cloppenburg	DE948
Lower Saxony	DE9	Weser-Ems	DE94	Emsland	DE949
Lower Saxony	DE9	Weser-Ems	DE94	Friesland (DE)	DE94A
Lower Saxony	DE9	Weser-Ems	DE94	Grafschaft Bentheim	DE94B
Lower Saxony	DE9	Weser-Ems	DE94	Leer	DE94C
Lower Saxony	DE9	Weser-Ems	DE94	Oldenburg, Landkreis	DE94D
Lower Saxony	DE9	Weser-Ems	DE94	Osnabrück, Landkreis	DE94E
Lower Saxony	DE9	Weser-Ems	DE94	Vechta	DE94F
Lower Saxony	DE9	Weser-Ems	DE94	Wesermarsch	DE94G
Lower Saxony	DE9	Weser-Ems	DE94	Wittmund	DE94H
North Rhine-Westphalia	DEA	Düsseldorf	DEA1	Düsseldorf, Kreisfreie Stadt	DEA11
North Rhine-Westphalia	DEA	Düsseldorf	DEA1	Duisburg, Kreisfreie Stadt	DEA12
North Rhine-Westphalia	DEA	Düsseldorf	DEA1	Essen, Kreisfreie Stadt	DEA13
North Rhine-Westphalia	DEA	Düsseldorf	DEA1	Krefeld, Kreisfreie Stadt	DEA14
North Rhine-Westphalia	DEA	Düsseldorf	DEA1	Mönchengladbach, Kreisfreie Stadt	DEA15
North Rhine-Westphalia	DEA	Düsseldorf	DEA1	Mülheim an der Ruhr, Kreisfreie Stadt	DEA16
North Rhine-Westphalia	DEA	Düsseldorf	DEA1	Oberhausen, Kreisfreie Stadt	DEA17
North Rhine-Westphalia	DEA	Düsseldorf	DEA1	Remscheid, Kreisfreie Stadt	DEA18
North Rhine-Westphalia	DEA	Düsseldorf	DEA1	Solingen, Kreisfreie Stadt	DEA19
North Rhine-Westphalia	DEA	Düsseldorf	DEA1	Wuppertal, Kreisfreie Stadt	DEA1A
North Rhine-Westphalia	DEA	Düsseldorf	DEA1	Kleve	DEA1B
North Rhine-Westphalia	DEA	Düsseldorf	DEA1	Mettmann	DEA1C
North Rhine-Westphalia	DEA	Düsseldorf	DEA1	Rhein-Kreis Neuss	DEA1D
North Rhine-Westphalia	DEA	Düsseldorf	DEA1	Viersen	DEA1E
North Rhine-Westphalia	DEA	Düsseldorf	DEA1	Wesel	DEA1F
North Rhine-Westphalia	DEA	Köln	DEA2	Bonn, Kreisfreie Stadt	DEA22
North Rhine-Westphalia	DEA	Köln	DEA2	Köln, Kreisfreie Stadt	DEA23
North Rhine-Westphalia	DEA	Köln	DEA2	Leverkusen, Kreisfreie Stadt	DEA24
North Rhine-Westphalia	DEA	Köln	DEA2	Düren	DEA26
North Rhine-Westphalia	DEA	Köln	DEA2	Rhein-Erft-Kreis	DEA27
North Rhine-Westphalia	DEA	Köln	DEA2	Euskirchen	DEA28
North Rhine-Westphalia	DEA	Köln	DEA2	Heinsberg	DEA29
North Rhine-Westphalia	DEA	Köln	DEA2	Oberbergischer Kreis	DEA2A
North Rhine-Westphalia	DEA	Köln	DEA2	Rheinisch-Bergischer Kreis	DEA2B
North Rhine-Westphalia	DEA	Köln	DEA2	Rhein-Sieg-Kreis	DEA2C
North Rhine-Westphalia	DEA	Köln	DEA2	Städteregion Aachen	DEA2D
North Rhine-Westphalia	DEA	Münster	DEA3	Bottrop, Kreisfreie Stadt	DEA31
North Rhine-Westphalia	DEA	Münster	DEA3	Gelsenkirchen, Kreisfreie Stadt	DEA32
North Rhine-Westphalia	DEA	Münster	DEA3	Münster, Kreisfreie Stadt	DEA33
North Rhine-Westphalia	DEA	Münster	DEA3	Borken	DEA34
North Rhine-Westphalia	DEA	Münster	DEA3	Coesfeld	DEA35
North Rhine-Westphalia	DEA	Münster	DEA3	Recklinghausen	DEA36
North Rhine-Westphalia	DEA	Münster	DEA3	Steinfurt	DEA37
North Rhine-Westphalia	DEA	Münster	DEA3	Warendorf	DEA38
North Rhine-Westphalia	DEA	Detmold	DEA4	Bielefeld, Kreisfreie Stadt	DEA41
North Rhine-Westphalia	DEA	Detmold	DEA4	Gütersloh	DEA42
North Rhine-Westphalia	DEA	Detmold	DEA4	Herford	DEA43
North Rhine-Westphalia	DEA	Detmold	DEA4	Höxter	DEA44
North Rhine-Westphalia	DEA	Detmold	DEA4	Lippe	DEA45
North Rhine-Westphalia	DEA	Detmold	DEA4	Minden-Lübbecke	DEA46
North Rhine-Westphalia	DEA	Detmold	DEA4	Paderborn	DEA47
North Rhine-Westphalia	DEA	Arnsberg	DEA5	Bochum, Kreisfreie Stadt	DEA51
North Rhine-Westphalia	DEA	Arnsberg	DEA5	Dortmund, Kreisfreie Stadt	DEA52
North Rhine-Westphalia	DEA	Arnsberg	DEA5	Hagen, Kreisfreie Stadt	DEA53
North Rhine-Westphalia	DEA	Arnsberg	DEA5	Hamm, Kreisfreie Stadt	DEA54
North Rhine-Westphalia	DEA	Arnsberg	DEA5	Herne, Kreisfreie Stadt	DEA55
North Rhine-Westphalia	DEA	Arnsberg	DEA5	Ennepe-Ruhr-Kreis	DEA56
North Rhine-Westphalia	DEA	Arnsberg	DEA5	Hochsauerlandkreis	DEA57
North Rhine-Westphalia	DEA	Arnsberg	DEA5	Märkischer Kreis	DEA58
North Rhine-Westphalia	DEA	Arnsberg	DEA5	Olpe	DEA59
North Rhine-Westphalia	DEA	Arnsberg	DEA5	Siegen-Wittgenstein	DEA5A
North Rhine-Westphalia	DEA	Arnsberg	DEA5	Soest	DEA5B
North Rhine-Westphalia	DEA	Arnsberg	DEA5	Unna	DEA5C
Rhineland-Palatinate	DEB	Koblenz	DEB1	Koblenz, Kreisfreie Stadt	DEB11
Rhineland-Palatinate	DEB	Koblenz	DEB1	Ahrweiler	DEB12
Rhineland-Palatinate	DEB	Koblenz	DEB1	Altenkirchen Westerwald)	DEB13
Rhineland-Palatinate	DEB	Koblenz	DEB1	Bad Kreuznach	DEB14
Rhineland-Palatinate	DEB	Koblenz	DEB1	Birkenfeld	DEB15
Rhineland-Palatinate	DEB	Koblenz	DEB1	Mayen-Koblenz	DEB17
Rhineland-Palatinate	DEB	Koblenz	DEB1	Neuwied	DEB18
Rhineland-Palatinate	DEB	Koblenz	DEB1	Rhein-Lahn-Kreis	DEB1A
Rhineland-Palatinate	DEB	Koblenz	DEB1	Westerwaldkreis	DEB1B
Rhineland-Palatinate	DEB	Koblenz	DEB1	Cochem-Zell	DEB1C
Rhineland-Palatinate	DEB	Koblenz	DEB1	Rhein-Hunsrück-Kreis	DEB1D
Rhineland-Palatinate	DEB	Trier	DEB2	Trier, Kreisfreie Stadt	DEB21
Rhineland-Palatinate	DEB	Trier	DEB2	Bernkastel-Wittlich	DEB22
Rhineland-Palatinate	DEB	Trier	DEB2	Eifelkreis Bitburg-Prüm	DEB23
Rhineland-Palatinate	DEB	Trier	DEB2	Vulkaneifel	DEB24
Rhineland-Palatinate	DEB	Trier	DEB2	Trier-Saarburg	DEB25
Rhineland-Palatinate	DEB	Rheinhessen-Pfalz	DEB3	Frankenthal Pfalz), Kreisfreie Stadt	DEB31
Rhineland-Palatinate	DEB	Rheinhessen-Pfalz	DEB3	Kaiserslautern, Kreisfreie Stadt	DEB32
Rhineland-Palatinate	DEB	Rheinhessen-Pfalz	DEB3	Landau in der Pfalz, Kreisfreie Stadt	DEB33
Rhineland-Palatinate	DEB	Rheinhessen-Pfalz	DEB3	Ludwigshafen am Rhein, Kreisfreie Stadt	DEB34
Rhineland-Palatinate	DEB	Rheinhessen-Pfalz	DEB3	Mainz, Kreisfreie Stadt	DEB35
Rhineland-Palatinate	DEB	Rheinhessen-Pfalz	DEB3	Neustadt an der Weinstraße, Kreisfreie Stadt	DEB36
Rhineland-Palatinate	DEB	Rheinhessen-Pfalz	DEB3	Pirmasens, Kreisfreie Stadt	DEB37
Rhineland-Palatinate	DEB	Rheinhessen-Pfalz	DEB3	Speyer, Kreisfreie Stadt	DEB38
Rhineland-Palatinate	DEB	Rheinhessen-Pfalz	DEB3	Worms, Kreisfreie Stadt	DEB39
Rhineland-Palatinate	DEB	Rheinhessen-Pfalz	DEB3	Zweibrücken, Kreisfreie Stadt	DEB3A
Rhineland-Palatinate	DEB	Rheinhessen-Pfalz	DEB3	Alzey-Worms	DEB3B
Rhineland-Palatinate	DEB	Rheinhessen-Pfalz	DEB3	Bad Dürkheim	DEB3C
Rhineland-Palatinate	DEB	Rheinhessen-Pfalz	DEB3	Donnersbergkreis	DEB3D
Rhineland-Palatinate	DEB	Rheinhessen-Pfalz	DEB3	Germersheim	DEB3E
Rhineland-Palatinate	DEB	Rheinhessen-Pfalz	DEB3	Kaiserslautern, Landkreis	DEB3F
Rhineland-Palatinate	DEB	Rheinhessen-Pfalz	DEB3	Kusel	DEB3G
Rhineland-Palatinate	DEB	Rheinhessen-Pfalz	DEB3	Südliche Weinstraße	DEB3H
Rhineland-Palatinate	DEB	Rheinhessen-Pfalz	DEB3	Rhein-Pfalz-Kreis	DEB3I
Rhineland-Palatinate	DEB	Rheinhessen-Pfalz	DEB3	Mainz-Bingen	DEB3J
Rhineland-Palatinate	DEB	Rheinhessen-Pfalz	DEB3	Südwestpfalz	DEB3K
Saarland	DEC	Saarland	DEC0	Regionalverband Saarbrücken	DEC01
Saarland	DEC	Saarland	DEC0	Merzig-Wadern	DEC02
Saarland	DEC	Saarland	DEC0	Neunkirchen	DEC03
Saarland	DEC	Saarland	DEC0	Saarlouis	DEC04
Saarland	DEC	Saarland	DEC0	Saarpfalz-Kreis	DEC05
Saarland	DEC	Saarland	DEC0	St. Wendel	DEC06
Saxony	DED	Dresden	DED2	Dresden, Kreisfreie Stadt	DED21
Saxony	DED	Dresden	DED2	Bautzen	DED2C
Saxony	DED	Dresden	DED2	Görlitz	DED2D
Saxony	DED	Dresden	DED2	Meißen	DED2E
Saxony	DED	Dresden	DED2	Sächsische Schweiz-Osterzgebirge	DED2F
Saxony	DED	Chemnitz	DED4	Chemnitz, Kreisfreie Stadt	DED41
Saxony	DED	Chemnitz	DED4	Erzgebirgskreis	DED42
Saxony	DED	Chemnitz	DED4	Mittelsachsen	DED43
Saxony	DED	Chemnitz	DED4	Vogtlandkreis	DED44
Saxony	DED	Chemnitz	DED4	Zwickau	DED45
Saxony	DED	Leipzig	DED5	Leipzig, Kreisfreie Stadt	DED51
Saxony	DED	Leipzig	DED5	Leipzig	DED52
Saxony	DED	Leipzig	DED5	Nordsachsen	DED53
Saxony-Anhalt	DEE	Sachsen-Anhalt	DEE0	Dessau-Roßlau, Kreisfreie Stadt	DEE01
Saxony-Anhalt	DEE	Sachsen-Anhalt	DEE0	Halle (Saale), Kreisfreie Stadt	DEE02
Saxony-Anhalt	DEE	Sachsen-Anhalt	DEE0	Magdeburg, Kreisfreie Stadt	DEE03
Saxony-Anhalt	DEE	Sachsen-Anhalt	DEE0	Altmarkkreis Salzwedel	DEE04
Saxony-Anhalt	DEE	Sachsen-Anhalt	DEE0	Anhalt-Bitterfeld	DEE05
Saxony-Anhalt	DEE	Sachsen-Anhalt	DEE0	Jerichower Land	DEE06
Saxony-Anhalt	DEE	Sachsen-Anhalt	DEE0	Börde	DEE07
Saxony-Anhalt	DEE	Sachsen-Anhalt	DEE0	Burgenlandkreis	DEE08
Saxony-Anhalt	DEE	Sachsen-Anhalt	DEE0	Harz	DEE09
Saxony-Anhalt	DEE	Sachsen-Anhalt	DEE0	Mansfeld-Südharz	DEE0A
Saxony-Anhalt	DEE	Sachsen-Anhalt	DEE0	Saalekreis	DEE0B
Saxony-Anhalt	DEE	Sachsen-Anhalt	DEE0	Salzlandkreis	DEE0C
Saxony-Anhalt	DEE	Sachsen-Anhalt	DEE0	Stendal	DEE0D
Saxony-Anhalt	DEE	Sachsen-Anhalt	DEE0	Wittenberg	DEE0E
Schleswig-Holstein	DEF	Schleswig-Holstein	DEF0	Flensburg, Kreisfreie Stadt	DEF01
Schleswig-Holstein	DEF	Schleswig-Holstein	DEF0	Kiel, Kreisfreie Stadt	DEF02
Schleswig-Holstein	DEF	Schleswig-Holstein	DEF0	Lübeck, Kreisfreie Stadt	DEF03
Schleswig-Holstein	DEF	Schleswig-Holstein	DEF0	Neumünster, Kreisfreie Stadt	DEF04
Schleswig-Holstein	DEF	Schleswig-Holstein	DEF0	Dithmarschen	DEF05
Schleswig-Holstein	DEF	Schleswig-Holstein	DEF0	Herzogtum Lauenburg	DEF06
Schleswig-Holstein	DEF	Schleswig-Holstein	DEF0	Nordfriesland	DEF07
Schleswig-Holstein	DEF	Schleswig-Holstein	DEF0	Ostholstein	DEF08
Schleswig-Holstein	DEF	Schleswig-Holstein	DEF0	Pinneberg	DEF09
Schleswig-Holstein	DEF	Schleswig-Holstein	DEF0	Plön	DEF0A
Schleswig-Holstein	DEF	Schleswig-Holstein	DEF0	Rendsburg-Eckernförde	DEF0B
Schleswig-Holstein	DEF	Schleswig-Holstein	DEF0	Schleswig-Flensburg	DEF0C
Schleswig-Holstein	DEF	Schleswig-Holstein	DEF0	Segeberg	DEF0D
Schleswig-Holstein	DEF	Schleswig-Holstein	DEF0	Steinburg	DEF0E
Schleswig-Holstein	DEF	Schleswig-Holstein	DEF0	Stormarn	DEF0F
Thuringia	DEG	Thüringen	DEG0	Erfurt, Kreisfreie Stadt	DEG01
Thuringia	DEG	Thüringen	DEG0	Gera, Kreisfreie Stadt	DEG02
Thuringia	DEG	Thüringen	DEG0	Jena, Kreisfreie Stadt	DEG03
Thuringia	DEG	Thüringen	DEG0	Suhl, Kreisfreie Stadt	DEG0S
Thuringia	DEG	Thüringen	DEG0	Weimar, Kreisfreie Stadt	DEG05
Thuringia	DEG	Thüringen	DEG0	Eichsfeld	DEG06
Thuringia	DEG	Thüringen	DEG0	Nordhausen	DEG07
Thuringia	DEG	Thüringen	DEG0	Unstrut-Hainich-Kreis	DEG09
Thuringia	DEG	Thüringen	DEG0	Kyffhäuserkreis	DEG0A
Thuringia	DEG	Thüringen	DEG0	Schmalkalden-Meiningen	DEG0B
Thuringia	DEG	Thüringen	DEG0	Gotha	DEG0C
Thuringia	DEG	Thüringen	DEG0	Sömmerda	DEG0D
Thuringia	DEG	Thüringen	DEG0	Hildburghausen	DEG0E
Thuringia	DEG	Thüringen	DEG0	Ilm-Kreis	DEG0T
Thuringia	DEG	Thüringen	DEG0	Weimarer Land	DEG0G
Thuringia	DEG	Thüringen	DEG0	Sonneberg	DEG0H
Thuringia	DEG	Thüringen	DEG0	Saalfeld-Rudolstadt	DEG0I
Thuringia	DEG	Thüringen	DEG0	Saale-Holzland-Kreis	DEG0J
Thuringia	DEG	Thüringen	DEG0	Saale-Orla-Kreis	DEG0K
Thuringia	DEG	Thüringen	DEG0	Greiz	DEG0L
Thuringia	DEG	Thüringen	DEG0	Altenburger Land	DEG0M
Thuringia	DEG	Thüringen	DEG0	Eisenach, Kreisfreie Stadt	DEG0N
Thuringia	DEG	Thüringen	DEG0	Wartburgkreis	DEG0P

=== Older version ===
In the 2003 version, before the abolition of the government regions in Sachsen-Anhalt, the codes were as follows

DEE1 Dessau

DEE11 Dessau, Kreisfreie Stadt
DEE12 Anhalt-Zerbst
DEE13 Bernburg
DEE14 Bitterfeld
DEE15 Köthen
DEE16 Wittenberg

DEE2 Halle

DEE21 Halle (Saale), Kreisfreie Stadt
DEE22 Burgenlandkreis
DEE23 Mansfelder Land
DEE24 Merseburg-Querfurt
DEE25 Saalkreis
DEE26 Sangerhausen
DEE27 Weißenfels

DEE3 Magdeburg

DEE31 Magdeburg, Kreisfreie Stadt
DEE32 Aschersleben-Staßfurt
DEE33 Bördekreis
DEE34 Halberstadt
DEE35 Jerichower Land
DEE36 Ohrekreis
DEE37 Stendal
DEE38 Quedlinburg
DEE39 Schönebeck
DEE3A Wernigerode
DEE3B Altmarkkreis Salzwedel

Changes

Changes from 2006 to 2010

- BRANDENBURG merged from two regions
- SAXONY restructured after 2008 redistricting legislation

Changes from 2010 to 2013

- MECKLENBURG-VORPOMMERN completely restructured and merged districts

Changes from 2013 to 2016:

DE91C created from merger of old DE915 Göttingen and DE919 Osterode am Harz
Boundary changes for DEB1C (old DEB16) and DEB1D (old DEB19)

== See also ==
- ISO 3166-2 codes of Germany
- FIPS region codes of Germany
- Subdivisions of Germany

== Sources ==
- Hierarchical list of the Nomenclature of territorial units for statistics – NUTS and the Statistical regions of Europe
- Overview map of EU Countries – NUTS level 1
  - DEUTSCHLAND – NUTS level 2
  - DEUTSCHLAND North – NUTS level 3
  - DEUTSCHLAND East – NUTS level 3
  - DEUTSCHLAND South – NUTS level 3
  - DEUTSCHLAND West – NUTS level 3
- Correspondence between the NUTS levels and the national administrative units
- List of current NUTS codes
  - Download current NUTS codes (ODS format)
- States of Germany, Statoids.com
- Districts of Germany, Statoids.com
