= Verkehrs- und Tarifgemeinschaft Ostharz =

Transit district in the Harz, Germany

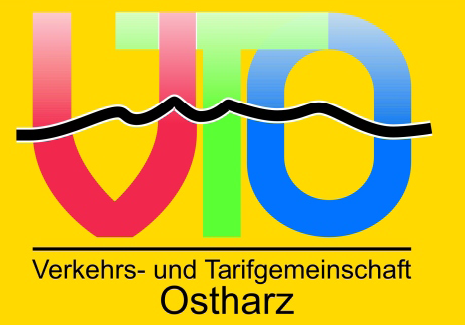
Logo of Verkehrs- und Tarifgemeinschaft Ostharz

The Verkehrs- und Tarifgemeinschaft Ostharz (VTO) was formed in 1995 by the transport companies of the former German districts of Halberstadt, Quedlinburg and Wernigerode (since July 2007 of the joint district of Harz).

== Development ==
The VTO originally comprised the following transport companies:

- Halberstädter Bus-Betriebe GmbH (HBB)
- Q-Bus Nahverkehrsgesellschaft mbH (Q-Bus)
- Wernigeröder Public Transport Company GmbH (WVB)
- Halberstädter Verkehrs-GmbH (HVG)

After the district area reform in 2007, WVB, HBB and Q-Bus were merged to form the Harzer Verkehrsbetriebe GmbH (HVB), so that currently (as of 2013) the following companies are united in the VTO:

- Harzer Verkehrsbetriebe GmbH (HVB)
- Halberstädter Verkehrs-GmbH (HVG)
- DB Regio AG (recognition of certain tickets)
- Harz-Elbe-Express (recognition of certain tickets)
- Harzer Schmalspurbahnen (HSB) (recognition of certain tickets)

== Area ==
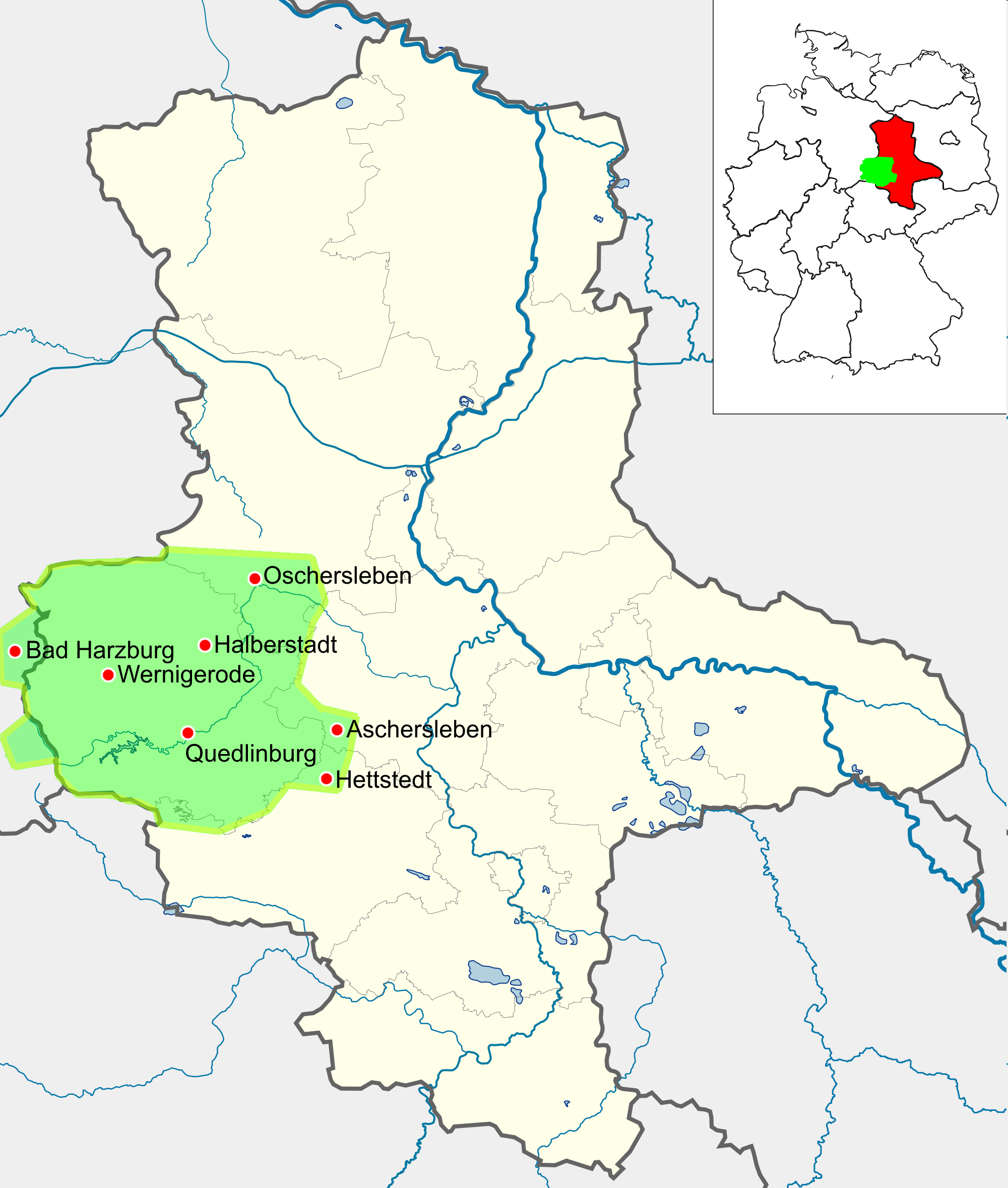
Tariff area of the VTO (as of 2015)

The core area of the VTO is the present Harz district. However, due to the intercity lines, the tickets are also valid beyond this area. Bad Harzburg, Braunlage (both Lower Saxony), Aschersleben (Salzlandkreis), Hettstedt, Wippra (both Mansfeld-Südharz) and Oschersleben (Bode) (Börde district) also have their own tariff zone within the VTO.

== Tariff structure ==
The aim was to ensure that tickets were mutually recognised within the three districts and to establish a uniform price board.

The price board was revised and the following cards were introduced: the 10-ticket card (since 2011 also the 4-ticket card), a transferable weekly and monthly ticket, a weekly and monthly trainee ticket and, exclusively for the city transport of Blankenburg and Wernigerode, the 9 o'clock ticket (9-Uhr-Karte), the family day ticket and the city card. On 1 May 2008, the social ticket was also introduced so that Hartz IV recipients are entitled to buy tickets at a reduced rate ("children's rate"). For the HVG area, VTO tickets are only valid for season tickets that include the Halberstadt tariff zone; in all other cases, a separate ticket must be purchased for the HVG tram.

The following tickets are offered:

- 9-Uhr-Karte is valid for one month on the city transport system of Wernigerode and Blankenburg and is valid for any number of journeys.
- Familien-Tageskarte is valid for two adults and two children (up to 11 years, since 2011 up to 14 years) only in the city transport system of Blankenburg and Wernigerode.
- CityCard is valid from the beginning for one year and entitles to use the city transport system of Blankenburg and Wernigerode.
- HarzTourCard is valid on three consecutive days in all participating companies.
- HarzMobilCard is an additional card which entitles you to travel with the reduced ticket ("children's fare") for one month. Included are the HSB (except Brocken), the trams in Halberstadt and selected trains of DB Regio and HEX.
- Selkebahnticket allows the use of selected bus lines of the HVB and the Selketalbahn and is valid for 3 days.
- WiSel-Card is valid on selected train and bus lines in the direction of Mansfeld Land, only on weekends and public holidays for one calendar day.

As special zone (as of 2015) are considered: Hornburg, Isingerode, Schladen, Wiedelah, Vienenburg, Eckertal, Bad Harzburg, Plessenburg, Steinerne Renne, Karlshaus, Hohnepfahl and Braunlage.
