= Heike Brehmer =

German politician

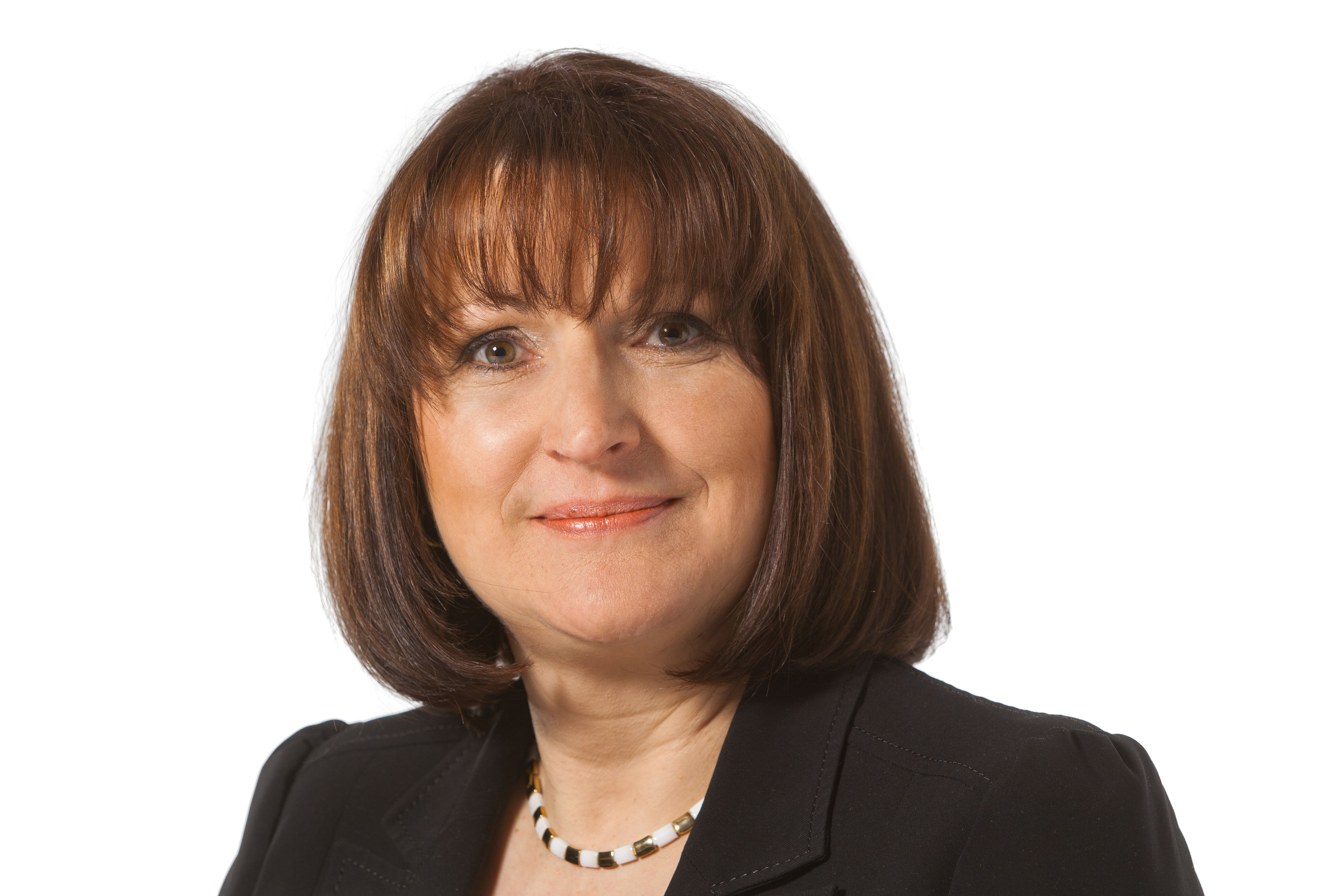

Member of the Bundestag for Harz
- In office 2009–2025

Personal details
- Born: 5 November 1962 (age 63) Staßfurt, East Germany
- Party: CDU

Heike Brehmer (born 5 November 1962) is a German politician of the Christian Democratic Union (CDU) who has been serving as member of the Bundestag and former district counselor of the district of Aschersleben-Staßfurt.

== Early life and career ==
Heike Brehmer was born in Staßfurt. She completed an apprenticeship in gastronomy and afterwards an apprenticeship as a merchant for agriculture and food industry (Land- und Nahrungsgüterwirtschaft, LNG). She later qualified to a business administration graduate at a Fachhochschule (FH).

From 1990 to 1994, she was a municipality director in Tarthun and from 1994 to 2003 head of the joint administrative office Bördeaue.

From 2008 to 2009, she was managing director of the Studentenwerk Magdeburg.

== Political career ==
=== Career in local politics ===
From 1990 to 2003, Brehmer was a member of the Aschersleben-Staßfurt district council, which she chaired between 1999 and 2003. On 27 April 2003, she was elected in the run-off election 61.4% as the successor of Thomas Leimbach district administrator of the district of Aschersleben-Staßfurt. On 22 April 2007, Heike Brehmer joined as CDU candidate for the district council post of the new Salzlandkreis district. In the run-off election on 6 May 2007, she lost against the candidate of the SPD, Ulrich Gerstner.

=== Member of Parliament, 2009–2025 ===
In June 2009, Brehmer was nominated by the CDU as the direct candidate for the constituency of Harz (constituency 69). In the 2009 federal election, she was able to move as directly elected representative for the first time in the German Bundestag, receiving 33% of the first votes. In 2013 federal election she was re-elected with 46%, in 2017 federal election with 36.4%.

In parliament, Brehmer has served on the Committee on Labor and Social Affairs (2009–2013), the Committee on Tourism (2014–2017, since 2021), and the Committee on Petitions (2018–2021). She chaired the Committee on Tourism (2014–2017) and the Committee on Petitions (2018–2021). In 2014, she joined the parliament's Council of Elders, which – among other duties – determines daily legislative agenda items and assigning committee chairpersons based on party representation.

Within her parliamentary group, Brehmer has been the deputy chairman of the workers' group and led the group of CDU parliamentarians from Saxony-Anhalt from 2013 until 2021.

Since 2009, Brehmer has been a member of the Federal Council of the CDU Association for Municipal Policies (Kommunalpolitische Vereinigung, KPV), since 2010 also deputy chairman of the CDU Saxony-Anhalt under the leadership of chairman Holger Stahlknecht.

In 2024, Brehmer announced, that she isn't seeking re-election for Bundestag.

== Other activities ==
- Konrad Adenauer Foundation, Member (since 2022)
- Federal Agency for Civic Education (BPB), Member of the Board of Trustees (since 2022)

== Political positions ==
In June 2017, Brehmer voted against Germany's introduction of same-sex marriage.

== Personal life ==
Brehmer is of Roman Catholic denomination, divorced and has two children.
