= Regions of Germany (disambiguation) =

The Regions or States of Germany are the sixteen current first-level administrative subdivisions of Germany.

Regions of Germany may also refer to:

- Natural regions of Germany
- Government regions of Germany (German: Regierungsbezirke), a second-level administrative division
- NUTS statistical regions of Germany

== See also ==
- Subdivisions of Germany
- Category:Historical regions in Germany
- List of historic states of Germany
