= List of German states by life expectancy =

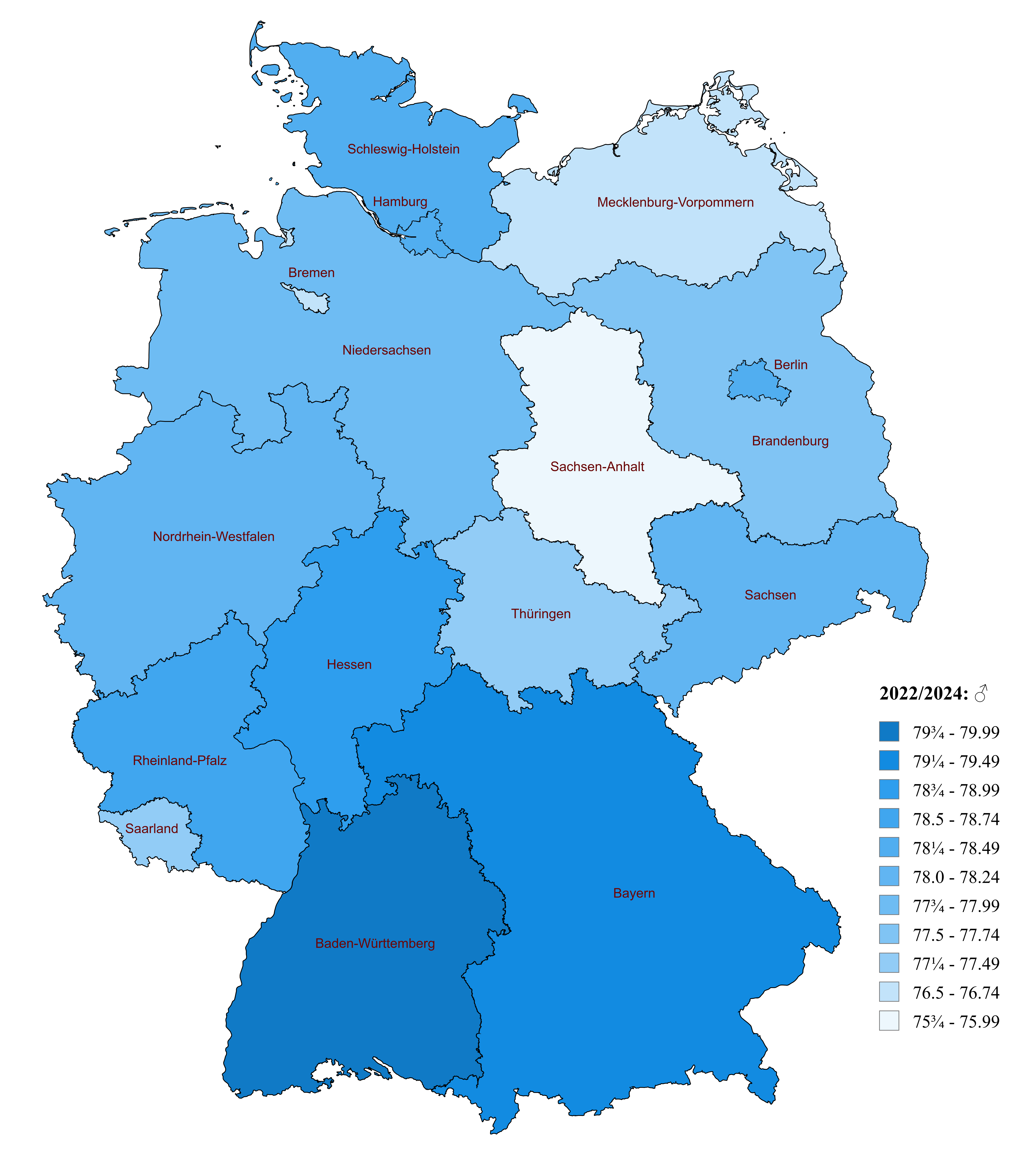
Life expectancy in the German states in 2022/2024 for male

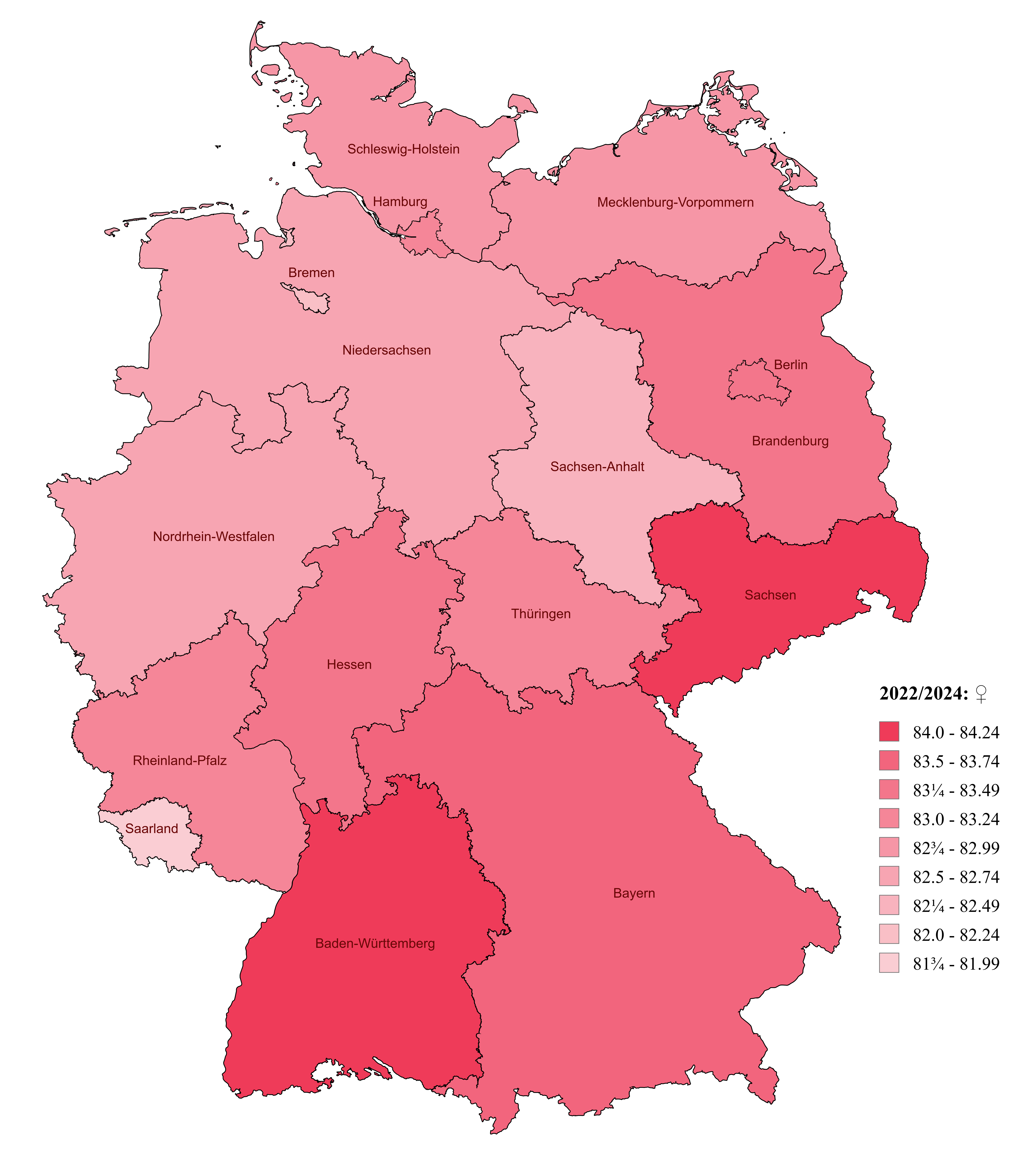
Life expectancy in the German states in 2022/2024 for female

Germany is administratively divided into 16 partly sovereign states. 13 of them are so-called area-states and 3 are city-states.

According to estimation of the United Nations, in 2023 life expectancy in Germany was 81.38 years (79.02 for male, 83.76 for female).

Estimation of the World Bank Group for 2023: 80.54 years total (78.20 for male, 83.00 for female).

Estimation of Eurostat for 2023: 81.1 years total (78.7 for male, 83.5 for female).

According to estimation of the WHO for 2019, at that year life expectancy in Germany was 80.97 years (78.75 years for male and 83.19 years for female).
And healthy life expectancy was 69.44 years (69.00 years for male and 69.86 years for female).

As of 2023, life expectancy in Germany is lower than in neighboring Denmark, Austria, Belgium, the Netherlands, Luxembourg, Sweden, Norway, France, and Switzerland. However, it is higher than in Czechia, Estonia, Poland, Slovakia, Latvia, and Lithuania.

The official statistics of Germany, available on the Destatis website, do not include total life expectancy for the population as a whole. For a more correct comparison of regions with various differences in life expectancy for men and women, a column with the arithmetic mean of these indicators was added to the tables.

== Destatis (2022/2024) ==
By default, the table is sorted by 2022/2024 period, the arithmetic mean.

state	2021/2023				change	2022/2024			
state	male	female	sex gap	arith. mean	change	male	female	sex gap	arith. mean
Germany on average	78.17	82.99	4.82	80.58	0.25	78.47	83.19	4.72	80.83
Baden-Württemberg	79.64	83.93	4.29	81.78	0.24	79.92	84.13	4.21	82.02
Bavaria	78.94	83.51	4.57	81.22	0.31	79.34	83.74	4.40	81.54
Hesse	78.63	83.11	4.48	80.87	0.21	78.88	83.28	4.40	81.08
Saxony	77.41	83.61	6.20	80.51	0.52	78.04	84.02	5.98	81.03
Berlin	78.08	83.17	5.09	80.62	0.21	78.37	83.29	4.92	80.83
Rhineland-Palatinate	78.34	82.92	4.58	80.63	0.18	78.60	83.03	4.43	80.82
Hamburg	78.14	82.98	4.84	80.56	0.19	78.41	83.10	4.69	80.76
Schleswig-Holstein	78.25	82.72	4.47	80.48	0.07	78.34	82.76	4.42	80.55
Brandenburg	77.17	83.09	5.92	80.13	0.41	77.66	83.42	5.76	80.54
North Rhine-Westphalia	77.91	82.43	4.52	80.17	0.18	78.13	82.58	4.45	80.35
Lower Saxony	77.77	82.59	4.82	80.18	0.11	77.96	82.63	4.67	80.29
Thuringia	76.76	82.59	5.83	79.68	0.58	77.38	83.14	5.76	80.26
Saarland	77.09	81.92	4.83	79.50	0.17	77.38	81.97	4.59	79.68
Mecklenburg-Vorpommern	76.24	82.58	6.34	79.41	0.25	76.53	82.78	6.25	79.66
Bremen	76.74	82.08	5.34	79.41	−0.01	76.74	82.06	5.32	79.40
Saxony-Anhalt	75.49	82.07	6.58	78.78	0.32	75.93	82.27	6.34	79.10

Data source: Destatis

== Destatis (2016/2018) ==
This is a list of German states by life expectancy at birth (average of 2016 to 2018) according to the Federal Statistical Office of Germany.

Rank	State	Life expectancy in years (mean of both)	Life expectancy in years (men)	Life expectancy in years (women)
1	Baden-Württemberg	81.88	79.66	84.10
2	Bavaria	81.56	79.33	83.56
3	Hesse	81.32	79.15	83.48
4	Hamburg	80.95	78.53	83.37
5	Saxony	80.94	77.97	83.91
6	Rhineland-Palatinate	80.84	78.62	83.06
7	Berlin	80.75	78.30	83.19
8	Brandenburg	80.51	77.76	83.26
9	Schleswig-Holstein	80.48	78.18	82.78
10	Lower Saxony	80.47	78.11	82.82
10	North Rhine-Westphalia	80.47	78.17	82.76
12	Thuringia	80.23	77.44	83.02
13	Mecklenburg-Vorpommern	79.95	76.76	83.14
14	Saarland	79.88	77.62	82.14
15	Bremen	79.83	77.18	82.47
16	Saxony-Anhalt	79.46	76.28	82.63
	Germany	80.88	78.48	83.27

== Eurostat (2014—2023) ==
By default the table is sorted by 2023.

code	region	2014				2014 →2019	2019				2019 →2023	2023				2014 →2023
code	region	overall	male	female	F Δ M	2014 →2019	overall	male	female	F Δ M	2019 →2023	overall	male	female	F Δ M	2014 →2023
	Germany on average	81.2	78.7	83.6	4.9	0.1	81.3	79.0	83.7	4.7	−0.2	81.1	78.7	83.5	4.8	−0.1
DE14	Tübingen	82.4	79.9	84.8	4.9	0.0	82.4	80.3	84.6	4.3	0.4	82.8	80.7	84.8	4.1	0.4
DE21	Upper Bavaria	82.6	80.4	84.6	4.2	0.2	82.8	80.9	84.7	3.8	−0.1	82.7	80.6	84.8	4.2	0.1
DE11	Stuttgart	82.5	80.2	84.7	4.5	0.1	82.6	80.4	84.7	4.3	0.0	82.6	80.4	84.7	4.3	0.1
DE13	Freiburg	82.2	80.0	84.2	4.2	0.1	82.3	80.2	84.4	4.2	0.0	82.3	80.3	84.2	3.9	0.1
DE27	Swabia	82.0	79.6	84.3	4.7	0.1	82.1	80.0	84.2	4.2	−0.1	82.0	79.9	84.2	4.3	0.0
DE12	Karlsruhe	81.9	79.6	84.0	4.4	−0.1	81.8	79.6	84.0	4.4	0.2	82.0	79.8	84.1	4.3	0.1
DED2	Dresden	81.6	78.6	84.6	6.0	0.3	81.9	79.1	84.8	5.7	0.0	81.9	79.0	85.0	6.0	0.3
DE71	Darmstadt	81.9	79.7	83.9	4.2	0.2	82.1	80.1	84.0	3.9	−0.4	81.7	79.6	83.7	4.1	−0.2
DE26	Lower Franconia	81.9	79.5	84.3	4.8	0.2	82.1	80.0	84.3	4.3	−0.4	81.7	79.5	83.9	4.4	−0.2
DEB3	Rheinhessen-Pfalz	81.4	79.0	83.7	4.7	−0.1	81.3	79.2	83.4	4.2	0.1	81.4	79.1	83.6	4.5	0.0
DE25	Middle Franconia	81.2	78.7	83.7	5.0	0.1	81.3	79.0	83.4	4.4	0.0	81.3	79.0	83.6	4.6	0.1
DEA2	Cologne	81.2	79.0	83.3	4.3	0.1	81.3	79.2	83.4	4.2	−0.1	81.2	78.9	83.3	4.4	0.0
DE30	Berlin	80.9	78.3	83.5	5.2	0.6	81.5	79.1	83.9	4.8	−0.3	81.2	78.7	83.7	5.0	0.3
DED5	Leipzig	80.8	77.7	84.0	6.3	0.2	81.0	78.1	84.0	5.9	0.2	81.2	78.3	84.3	6.0	0.4
DEA4	Detmold	81.4	79.0	83.8	4.8	0.2	81.6	79.2	83.9	4.7	−0.5	81.1	78.7	83.5	4.8	−0.3
DEB2	Trier	81.2	78.7	83.7	5.0	0.5	81.7	79.6	83.7	4.1	−0.7	81.0	78.7	83.3	4.6	−0.2
DE22	Lower Bavaria	80.7	78.3	83.2	4.9	0.7	81.4	79.4	83.5	4.1	−0.4	81.0	78.6	83.4	4.8	0.3
DEB1	Koblenz	80.8	78.5	83.0	4.5	0.3	81.1	79.0	83.1	4.1	−0.2	80.9	78.6	83.2	4.6	0.1
DE60	Hamburg	81.2	78.7	83.5	4.8	0.3	81.5	79.2	83.8	4.6	−0.6	80.9	78.5	83.3	4.8	−0.3
DEF0	Schleswig-Holstein	80.8	78.5	83.1	4.6	0.1	80.9	78.6	83.3	4.7	−0.1	80.8	78.6	83.1	4.5	0.0
DE23	Upper Palatinate	80.9	78.5	83.4	4.9	0.4	81.3	79.1	83.4	4.3	−0.5	80.8	78.6	83.0	4.4	−0.1
DE72	Giessen	81.3	79.0	83.5	4.5	−0.3	81.0	78.8	83.2	4.4	−0.3	80.7	78.4	83.0	4.6	−0.6
DE24	Upper Franconia	81.0	78.5	83.4	4.9	0.2	81.2	78.7	83.6	4.9	−0.5	80.7	78.2	83.2	5.0	−0.3
DE40	Brandenburg	80.7	77.9	83.5	5.6	0.5	81.2	78.4	84.0	5.6	−0.5	80.7	77.8	83.7	5.9	0.0
DE93	Lüneburg	80.7	78.1	83.4	5.3	0.2	80.9	78.5	83.2	4.7	−0.3	80.6	78.2	83.0	4.8	−0.1
DEA3	Münster	80.9	78.4	83.3	4.9	0.2	81.1	78.7	83.4	4.7	−0.5	80.6	78.2	82.9	4.7	−0.3
DED4	Chemnitz	80.9	77.8	83.9	6.1	−0.1	80.8	77.8	83.9	6.1	−0.2	80.6	77.5	83.9	6.4	−0.3
DE73	Kassel	81.2	78.6	83.6	5.0	0.1	81.3	79.0	83.6	4.6	−0.8	80.5	78.0	83.1	5.1	−0.7
DEG0	Thuringia	80.6	77.6	83.6	6.0	0.1	80.7	78.0	83.5	5.5	−0.2	80.5	77.7	83.5	5.8	−0.1
DE94	Weser-Ems	80.8	78.5	83.1	4.6	0.2	81.0	78.6	83.4	4.8	−0.6	80.4	78.1	82.8	4.7	−0.4
DE92	Hanover	80.7	78.0	83.3	5.3	0.3	81.0	78.4	83.5	5.1	−0.6	80.4	78.0	82.8	4.8	−0.3
DE91	Braunschweig	80.7	78.2	83.1	4.9	−0.1	80.6	78.4	82.9	4.5	−0.4	80.2	77.9	82.6	4.7	−0.5
DEA1	Düsseldorf	80.5	78.1	82.8	4.7	0.2	80.7	78.4	82.9	4.5	−0.5	80.2	77.9	82.5	4.6	−0.3
DEC0	Saarland	80.2	77.7	82.6	4.9	0.0	80.2	77.9	82.5	4.6	−0.2	80.0	77.6	82.4	4.8	−0.2
DE80	Mecklenburg-Vorpommern	80.4	77.2	83.7	6.5	−0.1	80.3	77.3	83.5	6.2	−0.3	80.0	76.9	83.3	6.4	−0.4
DEA5	Arnsberg	80.2	77.6	82.7	5.1	0.2	80.4	78.0	82.7	4.7	−0.5	79.9	77.5	82.3	4.8	−0.3
DE50	Bremen	80.1	77.4	82.7	5.3	0.6	80.7	78.0	83.3	5.3	−1.0	79.7	77.0	82.4	5.4	−0.4
DEE0	Saxony-Anhalt	79.8	76.6	83.0	6.4	0.2	80.0	77.0	83.1	6.1	−0.8	79.2	76.1	82.4	6.3	−0.6

Data source: Eurostat

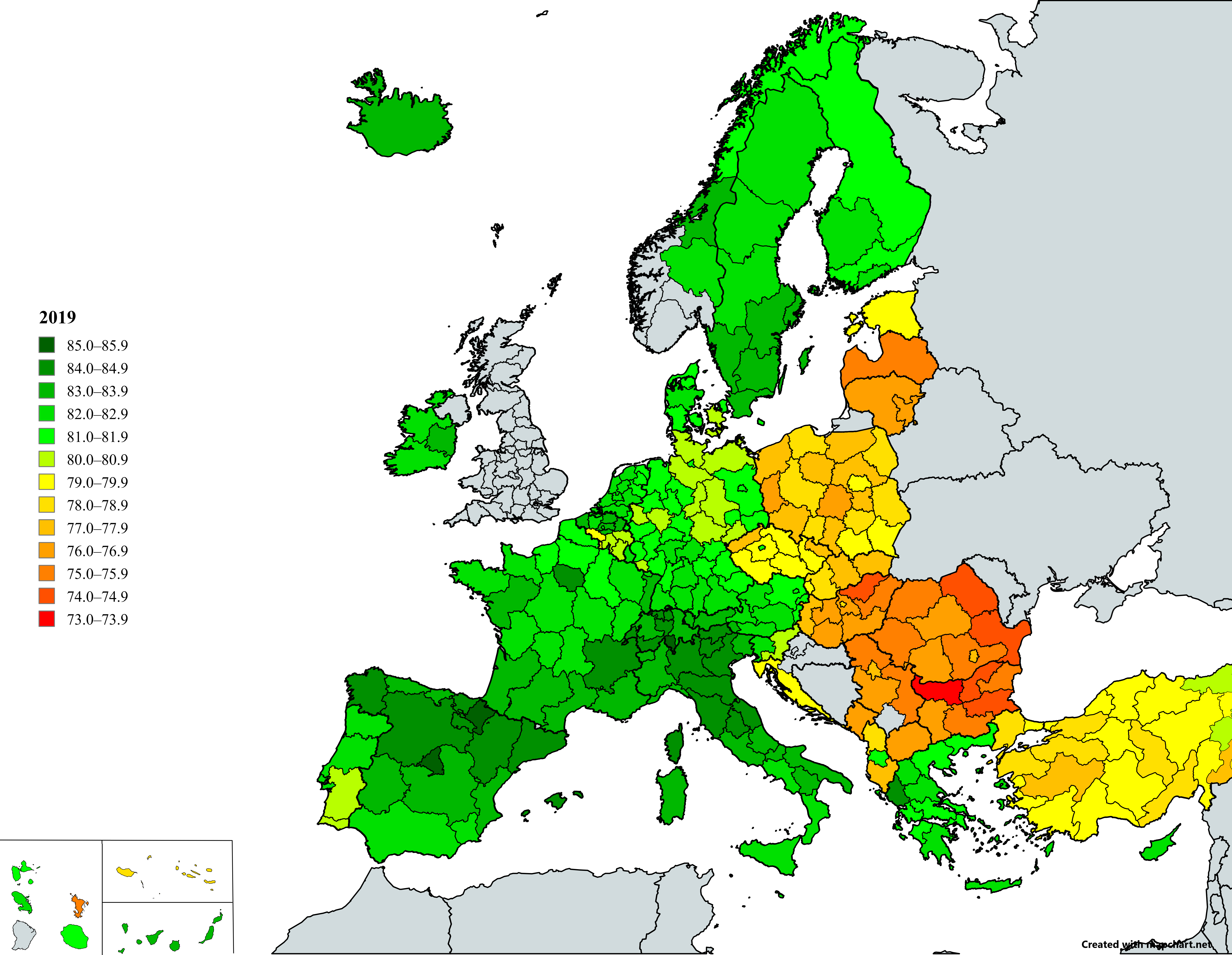
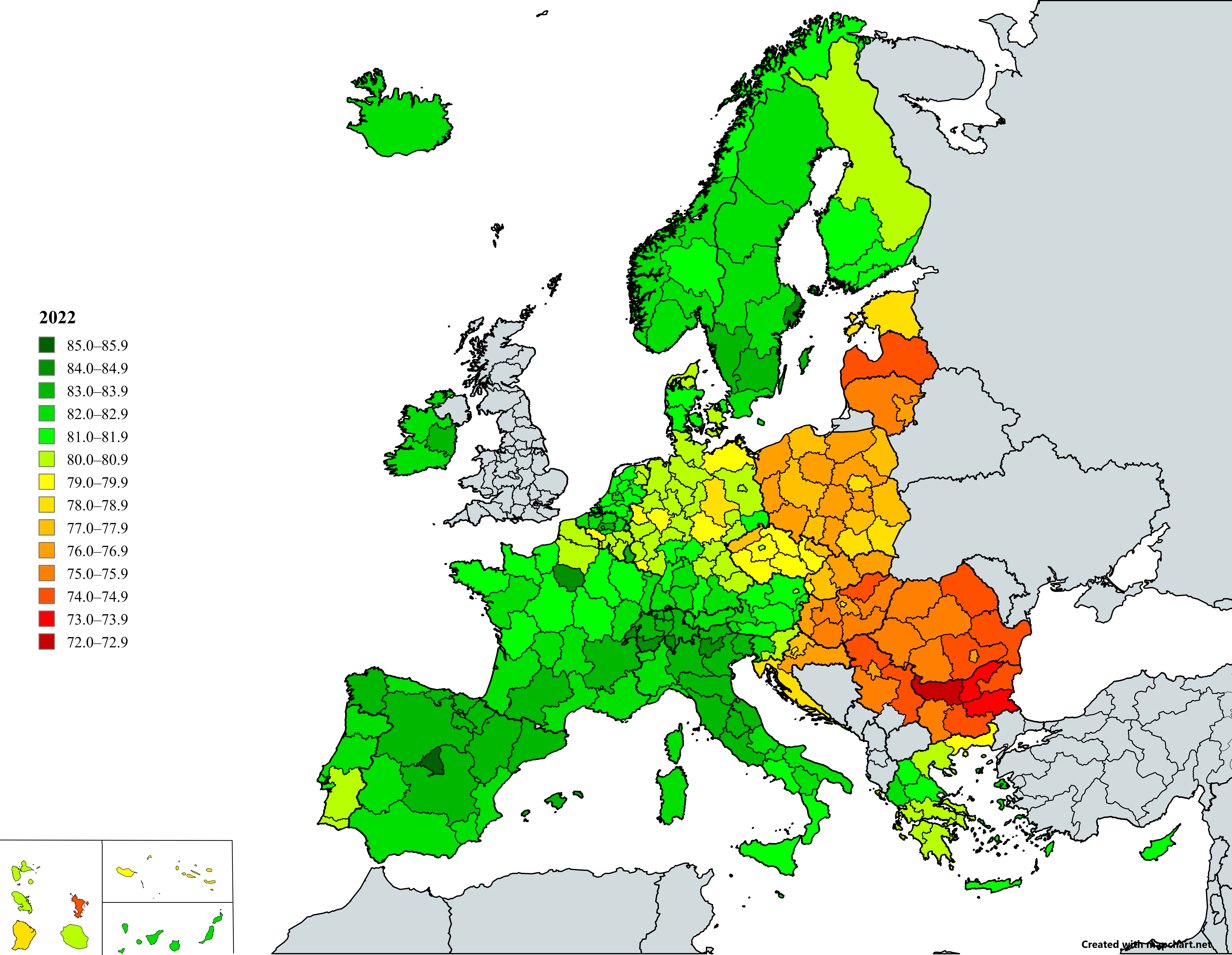
Life expectancy in German regions in comparison with regions of other European countries in 2019 and 2022, according to Eurostat
(legends on the maps are identical)

== Global Data Lab (2019–2022) ==
region	2019				2019 →2021	2021	2021 →2022	2022				2019 →2022
region	overall	male	female	F Δ M	2019 →2021	overall	2021 →2022	overall	male	female	F Δ M	2019 →2022
Germany on average	81.56	79.13	83.97	4.84	−0.93	80.63	0.36	80.99	78.51	83.49	4.98	−0.57
Baden-Württemberg	82.49	80.22	84.72	4.50	−0.63	81.86	0.34	82.20	79.94	84.42	4.48	−0.29
Bavaria	82.22	80.03	84.38	4.35	−1.01	81.21	0.49	81.70	79.34	84.08	4.74	−0.52
Hesse	81.94	79.75	84.07	4.32	−0.97	80.97	0.27	81.24	79.02	83.52	4.50	−0.70
Berlin	81.68	79.18	84.18	5.00	−0.95	80.73	0.45	81.18	78.44	83.84	5.40	−0.50
Saxony	81.46	78.46	84.56	6.10	−1.80	79.66	1.47	81.13	78.03	84.31	6.28	−0.33
Hamburg	81.68	79.28	84.08	4.80	−0.85	80.83	0.25	81.08	78.65	83.54	4.89	−0.60
Rhineland-Palatinate	81.46	79.26	83.60	4.34	−0.74	80.72	0.15	80.87	78.57	83.19	4.62	−0.59
Schleswig-Holstein	81.08	78.68	83.58	4.90	−0.35	80.73	−0.05	80.68	78.34	82.93	4.59	−0.40
Brandenburg	81.38	78.48	84.28	5.80	−1.64	79.74	0.84	80.58	77.54	83.64	6.10	−0.80
North Rhine-Westphalia	81.13	78.73	83.45	4.72	−0.78	80.35	0.16	80.51	78.12	82.86	4.74	−0.62
Lower Saxony	81.08	78.56	83.56	5.00	−0.64	80.44	0.00	80.44	78.00	83.01	5.01	−0.64
Thuringia	80.88	78.08	83.78	5.70	−2.04	78.84	1.23	80.07	77.14	83.03	5.89	−0.81
Mecklenburg-Vorpommern	80.48	77.38	83.78	6.40	−1.04	79.44	0.43	79.87	76.74	83.13	6.39	−0.61
Saarland	80.38	77.98	82.77	4.79	−0.84	79.54	−0.07	79.47	76.94	82.23	5.29	−0.91
Bremen	80.88	78.08	83.58	5.50	−0.94	79.94	−0.47	79.47	76.74	82.23	5.49	−1.41
Saxony-Anhalt	80.18	77.08	83.37	6.29	−1.84	78.34	0.73	79.07	75.84	82.53	6.69	−1.11

Data source: Global Data Lab

== Charts ==
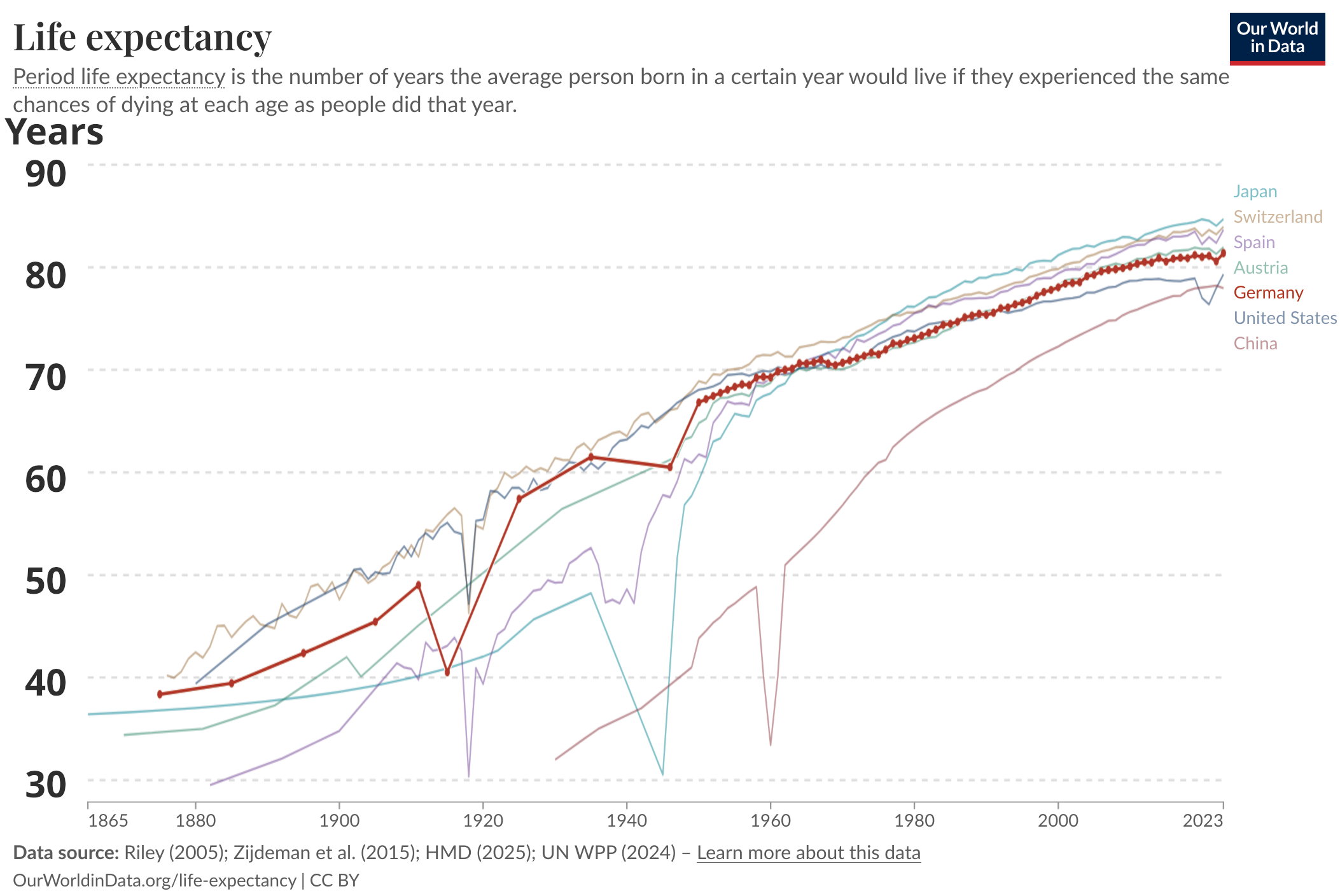
Average lifespan at birth with other countries of the D-A-CH countries and USA, China, Spain and Japan for comparison

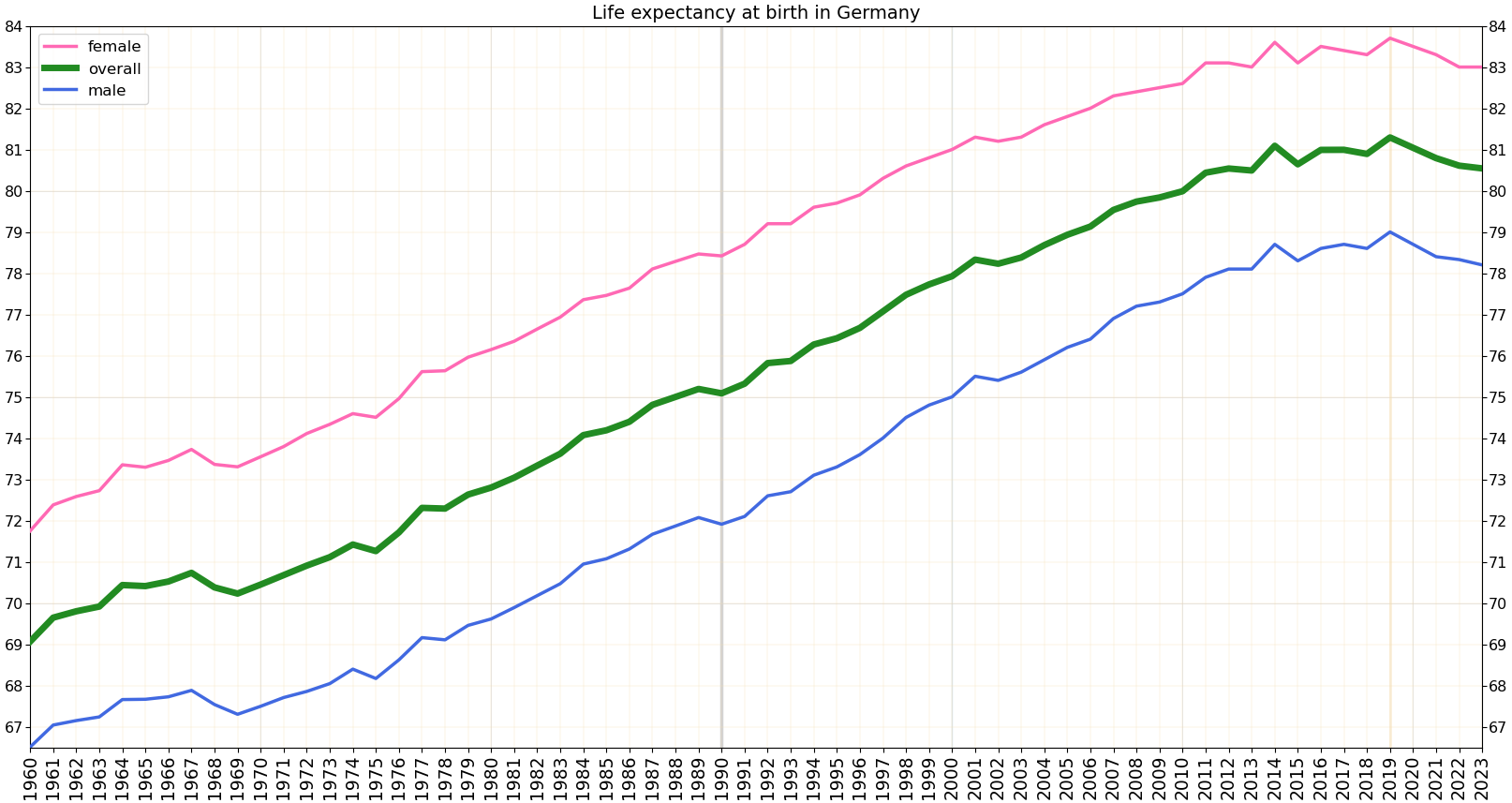
Development of life expectancy in Germany according to estimation of the World Bank Group

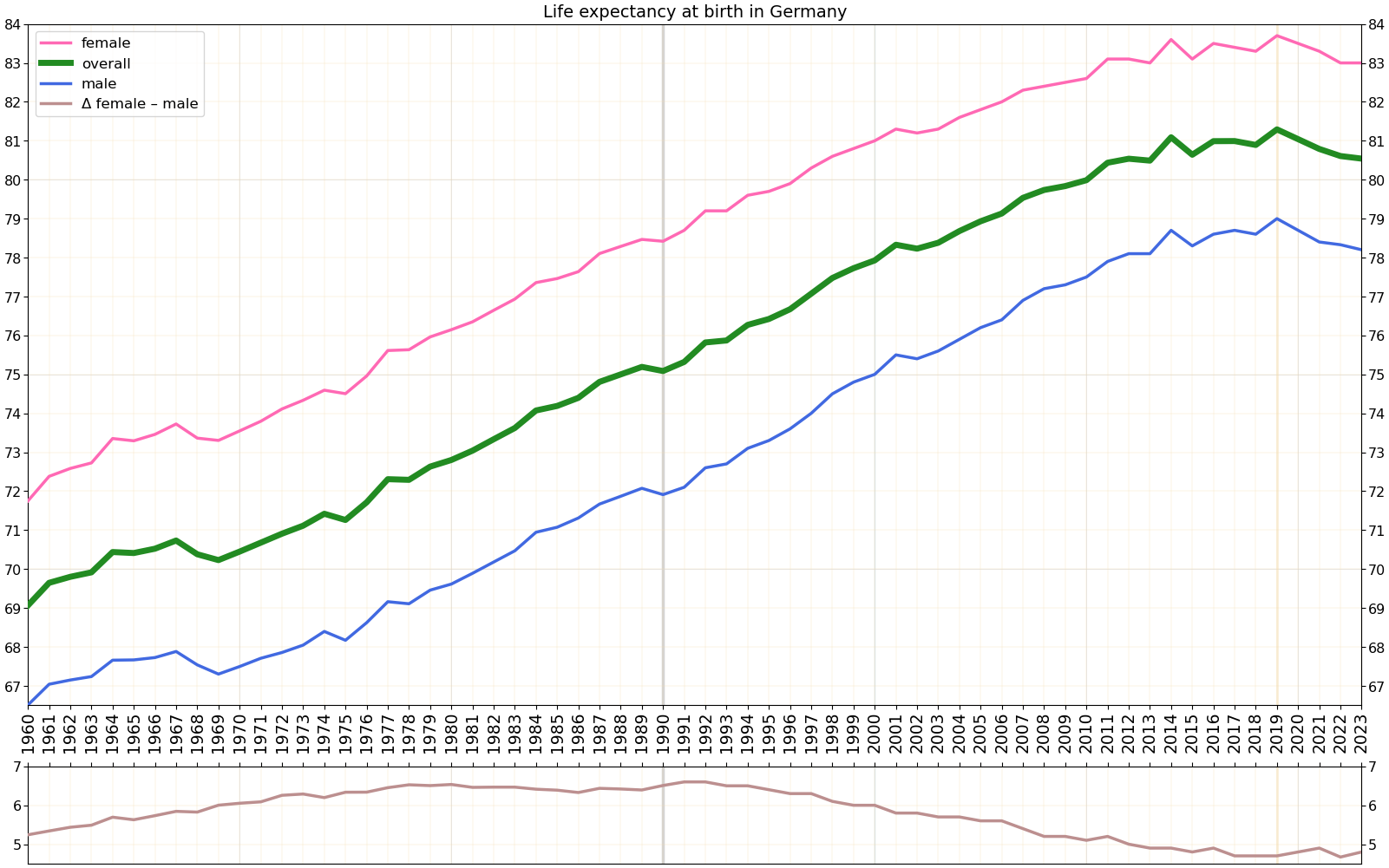
Life expectancy with calculated sex gap

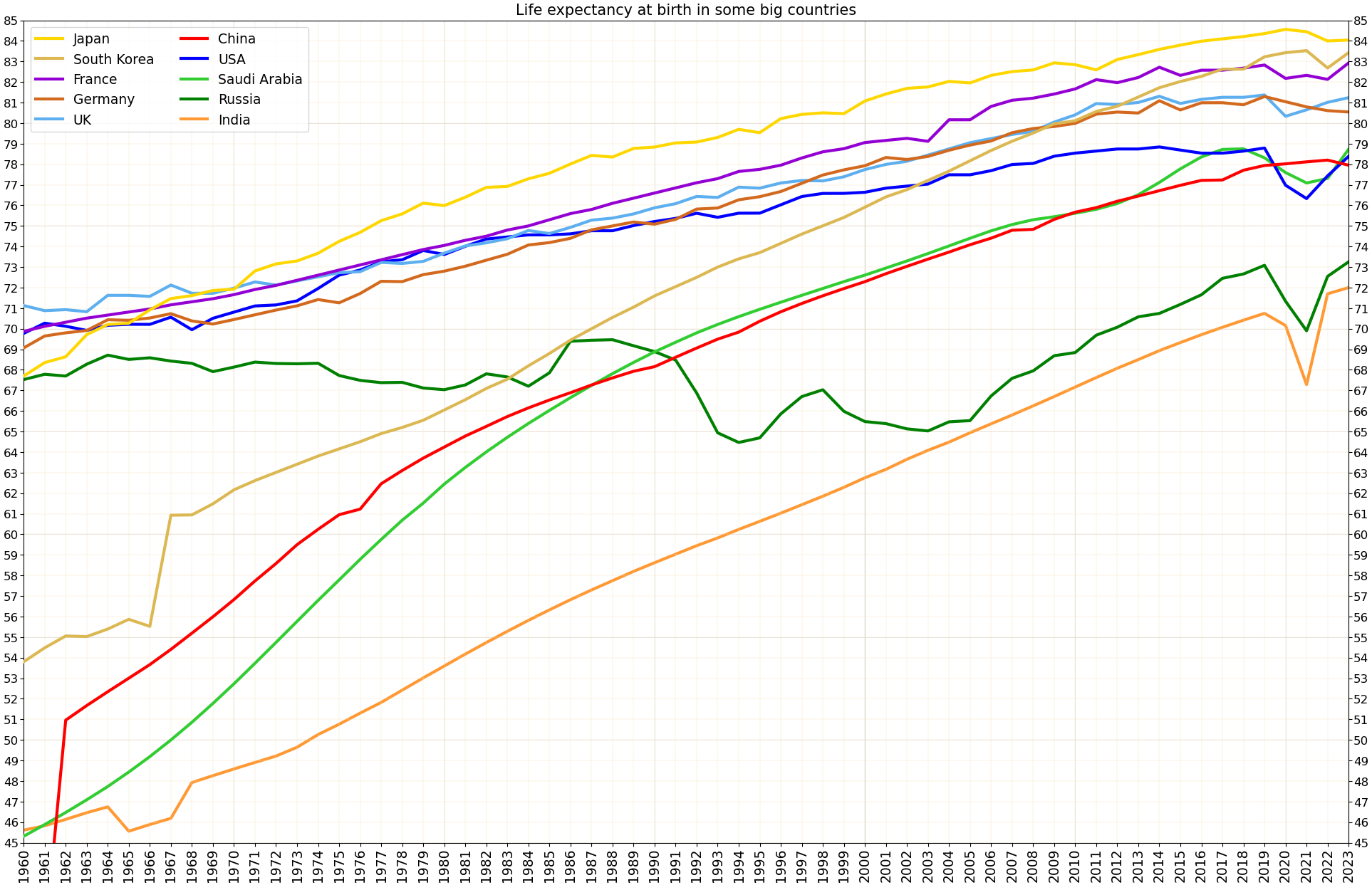
Development of life expectancy in Germany in comparison to some big countries of the world

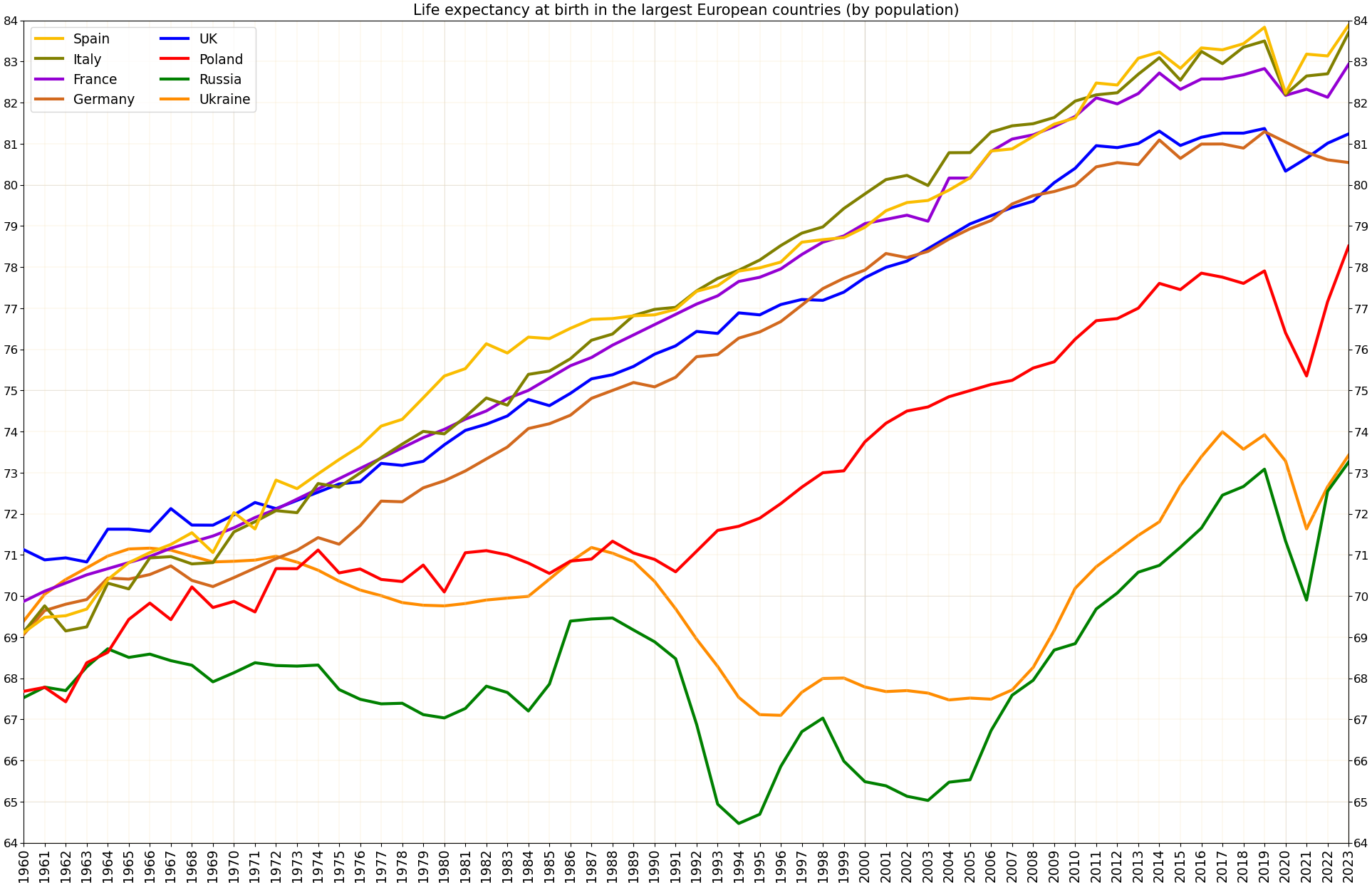
Development of life expectancy in Germany in comparison to the largest by population European countries

== See also ==
- List of countries by life expectancy
- List of European countries by life expectancy
- Demographics of Germany
