= VTO =

VTO may refer to:

- Valero Texas Open, a professional golf tournament
- Verkehrs- und Tarifgemeinschaft Ostharz, a German transport company
- Vertical takeoff, a class of rocket or aircraft
- Vitou language (ISO 639:vto), a Papuan language of Indonesia
- Volume-time output, in Process chemistry
- Vserosiikoe Teatralnoe Obshchestvo ("All-Russian Theatrical Society"), the Soviet-era name of the Union of Theatre Workers of the Russian Federation
