= Südliche Börde =

Südliche Börde (Southern Börde) was a Verwaltungsgemeinschaft ("collective municipality") in the district of Schönebeck, in Saxony-Anhalt, Germany. It is situated south of Schönebeck. The seat of the Verwaltungsgemeinschaft was in Förderstedt. In May 2006, the remaining members of the Verwaltungsgemeinschaft: Brumby and Glöthe, merged with Förderstedt, and the Verwaltungsgemeinschaft was disbanded.
