= Abraum salts =

Mixed deposit of salts in Germany

Abraum salts is the name given to a mixed deposit of salts, including halite (sodium chloride), carnallite, and kieserite (magnesium sulfate), found in association with rock salt at Aschersleben-Staßfurt in Germany. The term comes from the German Abraum-salze, "salts to be removed."

Abraum, which is red, is used to darken mahogany.
