= Florian Fahrtmann =

German politician (born 1983)

Member of the Landtag of Saxony-Anhalt
- Incumbent
- Assumed office 6 October 2026

Personal details
- Born: 1983 (age 42–43)
- Party: Social Democratic Party

Florian Fahrtmann (born 1983) is a German politician who was elected member of the Landtag of Saxony-Anhalt in 2026. He has served as secretary general of the Social Democratic Party in Saxony-Anhalt since 2025.
