= Monika Brudlewsky =

German politician (born 1946)

Member of the Bundestag
- In office 3 October 1990 – 17 October 2002

Personal details
- Born: 4 May 1946 (age 79) Groß-Ottersleben, East Germany (now Germany)
- Party: CDU

Monika Brudlewsky (born 4 May 1946) is a German politician of the Christian Democratic Union (CDU) and former member of the German Bundestag.

== Life ==
After graduating from high school, she attended the medical school from 1964 to 1966. She worked as a nurse in a hospital, a home for the elderly, a facility for the disabled and a doctor's practice (until 1990). In 1973 she joined the CDU of the GDR. In March 1990 she was elected to the Volkskammer, in December 1990 to the German Bundestag, of which she was a member until 2002.
