= Bördekreis =

- District
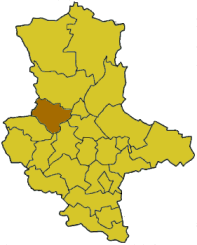
- Country: Germany
- State: Saxony-Anhalt
- Disbanded: 2007-07-01
- Capital: Oschersleben

Area
  - Total: 872.4 km^{2} (336.8 sq mi)

Population (2002)
  - Total: 78,662
  - Density: 90/km^{2} (230/sq mi)
- Time zone: UTC+01:00 (CET)
  - Summer (DST): UTC+02:00 (CEST)
- Vehicle registration: BÖ
- Website: http://www.boerdekreis.de

The Bördekreis was a district (Kreis) in Saxony-Anhalt, Germany. Neighboring districts were (from north clockwise) Ohrekreis, district-free city of Magdeburg, Schönebeck, Aschersleben-Staßfurt, Quedlinburg, Halberstadt and the district Helmstedt in Lower Saxony.

== History ==
The district was created in 1994 when the two districts Oschersleben and Wanzleben were merged. Both precursor districts were created in 1816 under the Prussian government, and only underwent small changes in the time until their inclusion into the new district. In 2007 the districts of Bördekreis and Ohrekreis were merged into a new Landkreis Börde.

== Geography ==
The district got its name from the landscape it is located in, the Magdeburger Börde. Due to the fertile loess soil it was for long an agricultural area.

The highest elevation is the Heidberg (211 m) east of Sommersdorf. There are several small rivers in the district, the most known one is the Aller.

== Coat of arms ==
The coat of arms shows two symbols for the agricultural history of the district, an ear and a scythe. The wavy line symbolizes the many small rivers in the district.

== Towns and municipalities ==
Verwaltungsgemeinschaften
1. Börde Wanzleben (incl. towns Seehausen and Wanzleben)
2. Obere Aller
3. Oschersleben (incl. towns Hadmersleben and Oschersleben)
4. Westliche Börde (incl. towns Gröningen and Kroppenstedt)
free municipalities
1. Sülzetal
