= Mansfelder Land (district) =

Coordinates: 51°31′N 11°33′E

- District
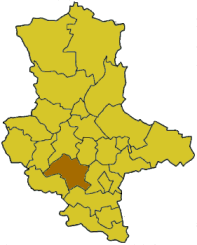
- Country: Germany
- State: Saxony-Anhalt
- Disbanded: 2007-07-01
- Capital: Eisleben

Area
  - Total: 758.71 km^{2} (292.94 sq mi)

Population (2002)
  - Total: 104,970
  - Density: 140/km^{2} (360/sq mi)
- Time zone: UTC+01:00 (CET)
  - Summer (DST): UTC+02:00 (CEST)
- Vehicle registration: ML
- Website: mansfelderland.de

Mansfelder Land was a district (Kreis) in the middle of Saxony-Anhalt, Germany. Neighboring districts were (from north clockwise) Aschersleben-Staßfurt, Bernburg, Saalkreis, Merseburg-Querfurt, Sangerhausen and Quedlinburg. It was merged on July 1, 2007, with Sangerhausen into the new district Mansfeld-Südharz as part of a reform.

== History ==
The district was created in 1994 by merging the previous districts Hettstedt and Eisleben. These were the successors of the Mansfelder Gebirgskreis (mountain district of Mansfeld) and Mansfelder Seekreis (lake district of Mansfeld), which were renamed after World War II.

The city of Eisleben is famous, being the birthplace of Martin Luther.

== Geography ==
The district is located in the southern foothills of the Harz mountains.

== Coat of arms ==
| The top-left quarter of the coat of arms shows the arms of the Counts of Mansfeld. The horizontal bars are the symbol of Querfurt, while the diamonds are the original symbol of the county of Mansfeld. The two symbols were combined when Burchhard von Querfurt became the Count of Mansfeld. The mining tools as well as the fish in the right half - taken from the coat of arms of the Mansfelder Seekreis - represent the industry of the district as well as the nature. The tree in the bottom-left also stands for the nature in the district, and was taken from the coat of arms of the Mansfelder Gebirgskreis. |

== Towns and municipalities ==
Towns
1. Mansfeld
Verwaltungsgemeinschaften
1. Gerbstedt (incl. town Gerbstedt)
2. Hettstedt (incl. town Hettstedt)
3. Lutherstadt Eisleben (incl. town Eisleben)
4. Mansfelder Grund-Helbra
5. Seegebiet Mansfelder Land
6. Wipper-Eine (incl. town Sandersleben)
