= Christina Baum =

German politician

Member of the Bundestag for Baden-Württemberg
- Incumbent
- Assumed office 2021

Personal details
- Born: 21 March 1956 (age 70) Grabe, Mühlhausen, Thuringia, Germany (then East Germany)
- Party: AfD

Christina Baum (née Sauser; born 21 March 1956) is a German politician from the AfD. She has been a Member of the German Bundestag from Baden-Württemberg since 2021.

Christina Baum is a dentist.

She is a proponent of the Great Replacement conspiracy theory and is referred to multiple times in a 2024 Federal Office for the Protection of the Constitution report about the orientation of the AfD.

== See also ==
- List of members of the 20th Bundestag
