= Schönebeck (district) =

Coordinates: 52°0′N 11°45′E

- District
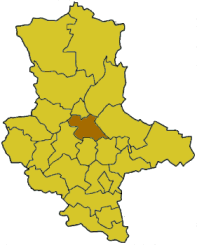
- Country: Germany
- State: Saxony-Anhalt
- Disbanded: 2007-07-01
- Capital: Schönebeck

Area
  - Total: 460.51 km^{2} (177.80 sq mi)

Population (2002)
  - Total: 75,321
  - Density: 160/km^{2} (420/sq mi)
- Time zone: UTC+01:00 (CET)
  - Summer (DST): UTC+02:00 (CEST)
- Vehicle registration: SBK
- Website: landkreis-schoenebeck.de

Schönebeck was a district (Kreis) in the middle of Saxony-Anhalt, Germany. Neighboring districts are (from north clockwise) the district-free city Magdeburg, the districts Jerichower Land, Anhalt-Zerbst, Köthen, Bernburg, Aschersleben-Staßfurt and Bördekreis.

== History ==
The district was created on July 1, 1816, with the capital Calbe, and was therefore named Landkreis Calbe. 1946 Schönebeck became a district-free city, but was reincorporated into the district in 1950 and became the new administrative seat. It was also renamed to Landkreis Schönebeck then to represent the change of capital.

== Geography ==
Main rivers in the district are the Elbe and the Saale. The landscape is the mostly flat Magdeburger Börde. The elevation of the district ranges between 43 m and 123 m above sea level.

== Partnerships ==
In 1991 the district started a friendship with the Polish district Jarosław, which was converted into a partnership in 2001. Another friendship with the district Wittmund in Lower Saxony.

== Coat of arms ==
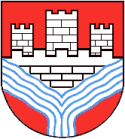
| The coat of arms show the two main rivers of the district, and their joining. The three towers of the caste symbolize the three cities in the district. The coat of arms were granted on October 10, 1991, replacing the old coat of arms which were very similar - only showing a castle with a single tower instead. |

== Towns and municipalities ==
Towns
1. Calbe
Verwaltungsgemeinschaften
1. Elbe-Saale (incl. town Barby)
2. Schönebeck (incl. town Schönebeck)
3. Südliche Börde
4. Südöstliches Bördeland
