= Aschersleben-Staßfurt =

Coordinates: 51°50′N 11°30′E

- District
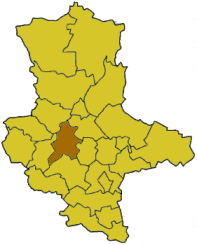
- Country: Germany
- State: Saxony-Anhalt
- Disbanded: 2007-07-01
- Capital: Aschersleben

Area
  - Total: 655 km^{2} (253 sq mi)

Population (1999)
  - Total: 107,500
  - Density: 160/km^{2} (430/sq mi)
- Time zone: UTC+01:00 (CET)
  - Summer (DST): UTC+02:00 (CEST)
- Vehicle registration: ASL
- Website: aschersleben-stassfurt.de

Aschersleben-Staßfurt was a district in Saxony-Anhalt, Germany until 2007. It was bounded by (from the northeast and clockwise) the districts of Schönebeck, Bernburg, Mansfelder Land, Quedlinburg and Bördekreis.

== History ==
The two districts of Aschersleben and Staßfurt were merged in 1994 in order to form the new district of Aschersleben-Staßfurt. As part of the reform of 2007 the district was disbanded and the area is now part of the Salzlandkreis district except Falkenstein which now is part of the Harz district.

== Geography ==
The southwestern parts of the district are occupied by the foothills of the Harz Mountains. From here the country slopes away to the Saale valley in the east and the Elbe valley in the northeast. Both rivers don't cross the district itself. The two main watercourses are the Bode and the Wipper, both affluents of the Saale.

Apart from the Harz foothills the region is mainly agriculturally used.

== Coat of arms ==
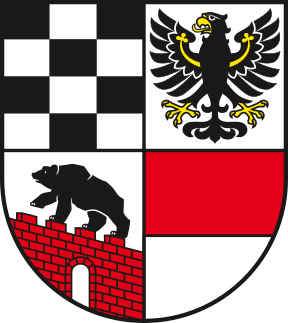
The coat of arms displays:
- top left: the black and white arms of the county of Aschersleben
- top right: the heraldic eagle of Prussia
- bottom left: the heraldic bear of the former state of Anhalt
- bottom right: the red and white arms of the duchy of Magdeburg

== Towns and municipalities ==
Towns
1. Falkenstein
Verwaltungsgemeinschaften
1. Aschersleben-Land (incl. town Aschersleben)
2. Egelner Mulde (incl. town Egeln)
3. Hecklingen (incl. town Hecklingen)
4. Seeland (incl. town Hoym)
5. Staßfurt (incl. town Staßfurt)

== See also ==
- Abraum salts, salt deposit (geological feature)
