= Quedlinburg (district) =

Coordinates: 51°48′N 11°09′E

- District
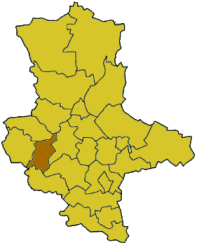
- Country: Germany
- State: Saxony-Anhalt
- Disbanded: 2007-07-01
- Capital: Quedlinburg

Area
  - Total: 540.36 km^{2} (208.63 sq mi)

Population (2002)
  - Total: 76,812
  - Density: 142.15/km^{2} (368.17/sq mi)
- Time zone: UTC+01:00 (CET)
  - Summer (DST): UTC+02:00 (CEST)
- Vehicle registration: QLB

Quedlinburg was a district (Kreis) in the west of Saxony-Anhalt, Germany. Neighboring districts are (from west clockwise) Wernigerode, Halberstadt, Bördekreis, Aschersleben-Staßfurt, Mansfelder Land, Sangerhausen and the district Nordhausen in Thuringia.

== History ==
In 1950, the district of Ballenstedt was added to the district. Parts of the districts of Blankenburg and of Aschersleben were added in 1994.

On July 1, 2007, the district of Quedlinburg was merged, with the districts of Halberstadt and of Wernigerode, into the new district of Harz.

== Geography ==
The northern part of the district is located in the Harz mountains.

== Coat of arms ==
The coat of arms shows symbols for the three historic landscapes in the district. In the top left part is an antler symbolizing the Regenstein county. The two knives are special knives used at a buffet (German: Kredenzmesser), which stand for the Abbey of Quedlinburg. The yellow-black stripes (fesses) derive from the coat of arms of the county Ballenstedt.

The coat of arms were granted on September 24, 1990, replacing the older arms which only contained the knives of Quedlinburg.

== Towns and municipalities ==
Towns
1. Quedlinburg
Verwaltungsgemeinschaften
1. Ballenstedt/Bode-Selke-Aue (incl. town Ballenstedt)
2. Gernrode/Harz (incl. town Gernrode)
3. Thale (incl. town Thale)
4. Unterharz (incl. towns Güntersberge and Harzgerode)
