= Wernigerode (district) =

Coordinates: 51°50′24″N 10°47′24″E

- District
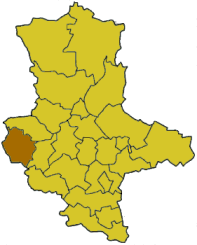
- Country: Germany
- State: Saxony-Anhalt
- Disbanded: 2007-07-01
- Capital: Wernigerode

Area
  - Total: 797.60 km^{2} (307.96 sq mi)

Population (2002)
  - Total: 94,556
  - Density: 118.55/km^{2} (307.04/sq mi)
- Time zone: UTC+01:00 (CET)
  - Summer (DST): UTC+02:00 (CEST)
- Vehicle registration: WR

Wernigerode was a district (Kreis) in the west of Saxony-Anhalt, Germany. The neighboring districts were (from north clockwise) Halberstadt, Quedlinburg, the district Nordhausen in Thuringia and the district Goslar in Lower Saxony. On 1 July 2007, during the district reform in Saxony-Anhalt it became part of the new district of Harz.

== Geography ==
The district is located at the northern end of the Harz mountains. The highest mountain of the Harz, the Brocken, is located in the southeast of the district.

== Coat of arms ==
The coat of arms are based upon those used by the principality and the diocese of Halberstadt. On top of the red and white areas are two fish, which are taken from the coat of arms of the counts of Wernigerode. Blazon: Per pale argent and gules, two salmo trutta hauriant respectant counterchanged.

== Towns and municipalities ==
Towns
1. Elbingerode
2. Wernigerode
Verwaltungsgemeinschaften
1. Blankenburg (incl. town Blankenburg)
2. Brocken-Hochharz (incl. towns Benneckenstein and Hasselfelde)
3. Ilsenburg (incl. town Ilsenburg)
4. Nordharz (incl. town Derenburg)
