= Halberstadt (district) =

Coordinates: 51.8958°N 11.0467°E

- District
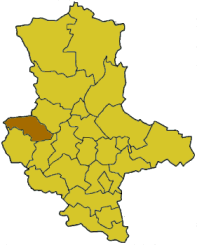
- Country: Germany
- State: Saxony-Anhalt
- Disbanded: 2007-07-01
- Capital: Halberstadt

Area
  - Total: 664.99 km^{2} (256.75 sq mi)

Population (2002)
  - Total: 77,876
  - Density: 117.11/km^{2} (303.31/sq mi)
- Time zone: UTC+01:00 (CET)
  - Summer (DST): UTC+02:00 (CEST)
- Vehicle registration: HBS
- Website: landkreis.halberstadt.de

Halberstadt was a district (Kreis) in the middle of Saxony-Anhalt, Germany. Neighboring districts were (from north clockwise) Bördekreis, Quedlinburg, Wernigerode, Goslar, Wolfenbüttel, Helmstedt.

== History ==
The region around Halberstadt was a clerical principality, which emerged with the creation of the Bishopric of Halberstadt in 804 and existed until the Thirty Years' War. In 1648 it was secularized and became part of Brandenburg-Prussia as the Principality of Halberstadt. During the Napoleonic Wars it became part of the French-controlled Kingdom of Westphalia, where Halberstadt was the capital of the Département of the Saale. In 1815 it came back to the Kingdom of Prussia, and in 1816 it became part of the Regierungsbezirk Magdeburg within the newly established Prussian Province of Saxony. At the same time the Landkreis (district) of Halberstadt was created. In 1825 it was merged with the Osterwieck district.

On 1 July 2007 the district was merged with the districts of Quedlinburg and Wernigerode to form the new district of Harz.

== Geography ==
The district is located at the northern end of the Harz mountains.

== Coat of arms ==
The coat of arms is the same as that used by the principality and the diocese of Halberstadt historically.

== Towns and municipalities ==
Towns
1. Halberstadt
Verwaltungsgemeinschaften
1. Bode-Holtemme (incl. towns Schwanebeck and Wegeleben)
2. Harzvorland-Huy
3. Osterwieck-Fallstein (incl. town Osterwieck)
Free municipalities
1. Huy
