= Bundesstraße 6n =

Federal highway in Germany

B 6n
- Bundesstraße 6n
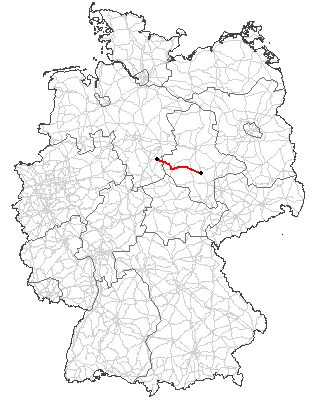

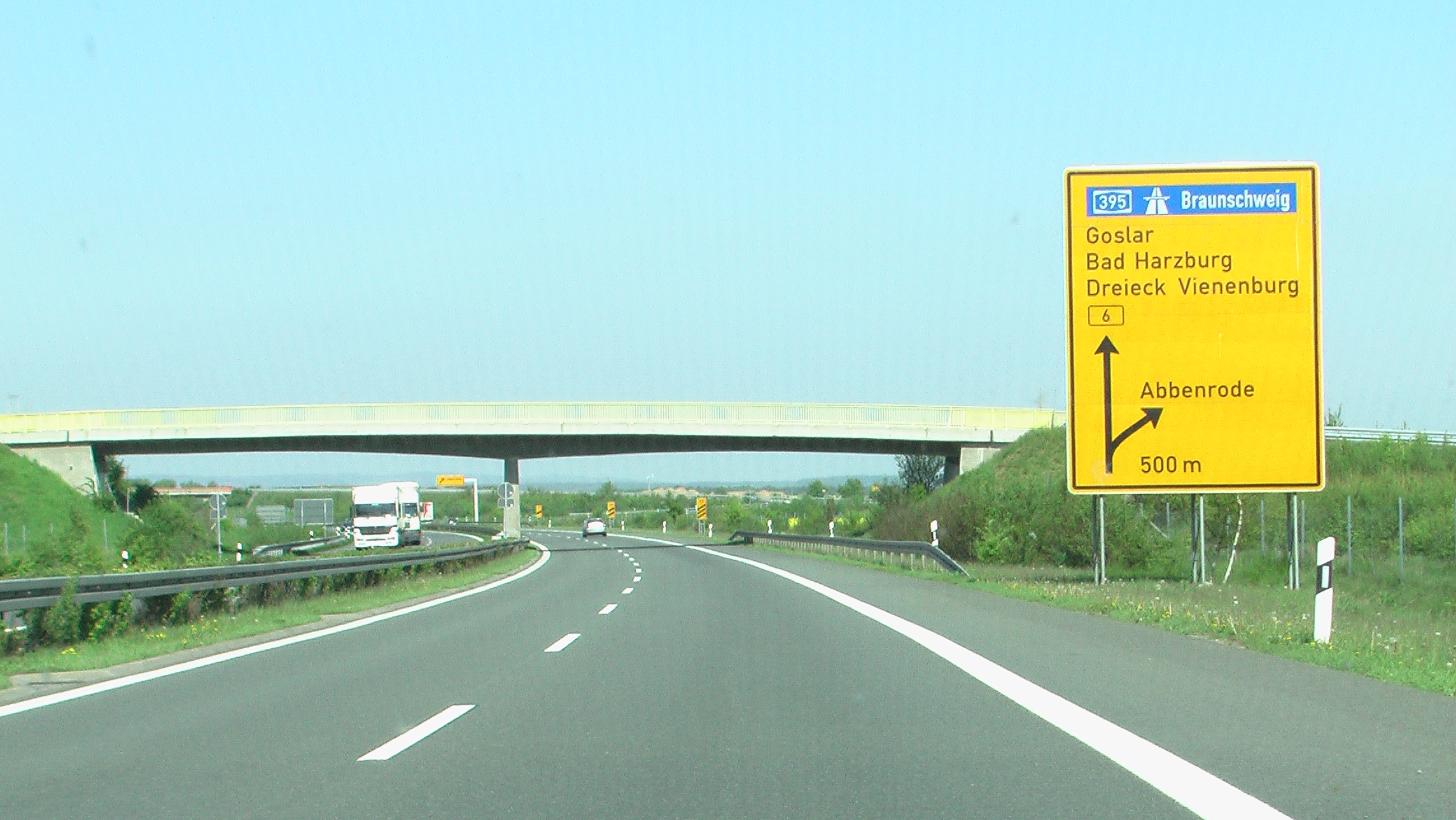
- The B6n near Abbenrode

Route information
- Length: 94 km (58 mi)

Major junctions
- West end: A 395
- East end: Bernburg (Saale)

Location
- Country: Germany
- States: Lower Saxony, Saxony-Anhalt

Highway system
- Roads in Germany; Autobahns; List; Federal; List; State; E-roads

The Bundesstraße 6n is a German federal road that runs east-west from the Vienenburg district of Goslar to Bernburg, where it connects to the A14. It was originally planned to be the A 36 motorway. It is intended to have four lanes running from the A 395 near Vienenburg through Wernigerode, Blankenburg, Quedlinburg, Aschersleben over the A 14 to Bernburg (Saale).

The designation B 6n has been given to distinguish it from the old B 6 and B 185 during the planning and construction phase. After it is opened to traffic and the old Bundesstraße is downgraded to a Landesstraße or Kreisstraßen the B 6n will be renumbered the B 6 from Goslar to Aschersleben, the remaining section to the A 14 will become the B 185. For the most part the signs have already been changed accordingly.

== Route ==
The B 6n is signed off the A 14 (Magdeburg–Halle/Leipzig) motorway at Bernburg motorway junction and, after Braunschweig (Brunswick), it joins the A 395 at the Vienenburg three-way interchange (Autobahndreieck). It is thus intended to link these two motorways and create a new east–west axis. It is also intended to relieve traffic on the A 2 by providing an alternative route. The B 6 is being downgraded; indeed it already has been in those sections where the B 6n has already been built and is no longer signed as a Bundesstraße or federal road.

From Vienenburg the B 6 continues as a 4-lane dual carriageway or Schnellstraße to Goslar and from there as the B 82, albeit no longer a Schnellstraße, to the A 7 motorway near Rhüden. During ultrasound testing on the route of the B 6n numerous sites of archaeological significance were found, including a burial hut (Totenhütte ) of the Bernburg culture near Benzingerode in the borough of Wernigerode.

The section between the three-way intersection at Vienenburg and Bernburg is already finished. This has relieved through traffic in the towns and villages by providing a motorway-like Schnellstraße or so-called "yellow motorway" (gelbe Autobahn).

The extension of the B 6n is in planning and will consist of a ring road around Bernburg. In addition, there are preliminary investigations into an extension of the B 6 as far as the A 9 motorway. The route is intended to pass south of Köthen. The regional planning procedure for this was completed in 2001. The link to the A9 will be built near Thurland (about 5 kilometres south of the Dessau-Süd junction). There were thoughts about a further extension to Cottbus, but these have been put aside, because it was assessed that this route would not be used by a lot of traffic.

At present the B 6n is open from the west i.e. Goslar as far as the Bernburg junction.

Since 11 July 2007, planning and building law applies to all 13 sections (as far as the A 14).

However, complaints were made to the Federal Administrative Court against the planning decision for section 13.3 (between Ilberstedt and the A 14). This legal dispute ended on 5 November 2008 with a court-proposed settlement agreement.

According to the court decision, all applications for the B 6n gained governmental approval, which meant that the B 6n could be completed in the direction of the A 14 and lengthened as far as Bernburg. This last section was opened to traffic on 11 December 2011.

== Administrative regions ==
The B 6n passes through the following administrative regions:

- Lower Saxony
  - Goslar district
    - Vienenburg
- Saxony-Anhalt
  - Harz district
    - Verwaltungsgemeinschaft Nordharz: Abbenrode, Stapelburg
    - Ilsenburg
    - Wernigerode
    - Verwaltungsgemeinschaft Blankenburg: Heimburg, Blankenburg
    - Verwaltungsgemeinschaft Thale: Thale, Westerhausen
    - Quedlinburg
  - Salzlandkreis
    - Seeland
    - Aschersleben
    - Verwaltungsgemeinschaft Saale-Wipper: Güsten, Ilberstedt
    - Verwaltungsgemeinschaft Bernburg: Bernburg (Saale)

== See also ==
- List of federal roads in Germany
- Bundesstraße 6
