= Börde – Salzlandkreis =

Federal electoral district of Germany

67 Börde – Salzlandkreis
- Electoral district for the Bundestag
- Börde – Salzlandkreis in 2025
- State: Saxony-Anhalt
- Population: 260,500 (2019)
- Electorate: 215,532 (2021)
- Major settlements: Bernburg; Staßfurt; Oschersleben
- Area: 3,170.95 km^{2}

Current electoral district
- Created: 2009
- Party: AFD
- Member: Jan Wenzel Schmidt
- Elected: 2025

Börde – Salzlandkreis is an electoral constituency (German: Wahlkreis) represented in the Bundestag. It elects one member via first-past-the-post voting. Under the current constituency numbering system, it is designated as constituency 67. It is located in northern Saxony-Anhalt, comprising the district of Börde and part of Salzlandkreis.

Börde – Salzlandkreis was created for the 2009 federal election. From 2021 to 2025, it was represented by Franziska Kersten of the Social Democratic Party (SPD). Since 2025 it has been represented by Jan Wenzel Schmidt of the AFD.

== Geography ==
Börde – Jerichower Land is located in northern Saxony-Anhalt. As of the 2025 federal election, it comprises the districts of Börde as well as the municipalities of Bernburg, Hecklingen, Könnern, Nienburg, and Staßfurt and the collective municipalities of Egelner Mulde and Saale-Wipper from the Salzlandkreis district.

== History ==
Börde – Salzlandkreis, originally Börde – Jerichower Land, was created in 2009 and contained parts of the abolished constituencies of Elbe-Havel-Gebiet and Börde. In the 2009 election, it was constituency 68 in the numbering system. Since the 2013 election, it has been number 67. Until the 2025 election, it comprised the districts of Börde and Jerichower Land.

Election	No.	Name	Borders
2009	68	Börde – Jerichower Land	Börde district; Jerichower Land district
2013	67	Börde – Jerichower Land	Börde district; Jerichower Land district
2017	67	Börde – Jerichower Land	Börde district; Jerichower Land district
2021	67	Börde – Jerichower Land	Börde district; Jerichower Land district
2025	67	Börde – Salzlandkreis	Börde district; Salzlandkreis district (only Bernburg, Hecklingen, Könnern, Nienburg, and Staßfurt municipalities and Egelner Mulde and Saale-Wipper Verbandsgemeinde)

== Members ==
The constituency was represented by Manfred Behrens of the Christian Democratic Union (CDU) from its formation until 2021. Franziska Kersten won it for the Social Democratic Party (SPD) in 2021.

Election	Member	Party	%
2009	Manfred Behrens	CDU	32.7
2013	Manfred Behrens	CDU	44.6
2017	Manfred Behrens	CDU	37.8
2021	Franziska Kersten	SPD	26.2
2025	Jan Schmidt	AfD	43.2

== Election results ==
=== 2025 election ===
Federal election (2025): Börde – Salzlandkreis
Notes:	Blue background denotes the winner of the electorate vote. Pink background denotes a candidate elected from their party list. Yellow background denotes an electorate win by a list member, or other incumbent. A ✓ or ✗ denotes status of any incumbent, win or lose respectively.						
Party	Candidate	Votes	%	±%	Party votes	%	±%
AfD	Jan Schmidt	72,650	43.2	▲21.1	70,158	41.5	▲19.9
CDU	Anna Aeikens	37,608	22.4	▼2.0	32,353	19.1	▼2.8
BSW					19,062	11.3	New
SPD	✗ Franziska Kersten	22,894	13.6	▼10.0	17,576	10.4	▼14.9
Left	David Schliesing	17,753	10.6	▼0.7	15,344	9.1	▼0.1
FDP	Amy Schneider	4,606	2.7	▼5.5	4,941	2.9	▼6.9
Greens	Sandra Bauer	3,746	2.2	▼1.6	4,463	2.6	▼1.8
Independent	Jens Kersten	1,841	1.1	New			
PARTEI					1,146	0.7	0.0
Volt					809	0.5	▲0.4
BD	Mario Laddey	2,364	1.4	New	795	0.5	New
MLPD					118	0.1	0.0
Informal votes		2,283			1,519		
Total valid votes		168,201			168,965		
Turnout		170,484	78.6	▲11.4			
AfD gain from SPD	Majority	35,042	20.8	N/A			

=== 2021 election ===
Federal election (2021): Börde – Jerichower Land
Notes:	Blue background denotes the winner of the electorate vote. Pink background denotes a candidate elected from their party list. Yellow background denotes an electorate win by a list member, or other incumbent. A ✓ or ✗ denotes status of any incumbent, win or lose respectively.						
Party	Candidate	Votes	%	±%	Party votes	%	±%
SPD	Franziska Kersten	38,520	26.2	▲6.3	39,043	26.6	▲10.3
CDU	Gerry Weber	36,652	25.0	▼12.8	32,720	22.3	▼9.9
AfD	Jan Schmidt	29,843	20.3		29,604	20.1	▲1.3
Left	David Schliesing	12,785	8.7	▼11.6	12,426	8.5	▼8.1
FDP	Mathias Schulte	11,817	8.1	▲0.5	13,589	9.2	▲1.5
Greens	Thomas Schlenker	6,184	4.2	▲1.8	7,267	4.9	▲2.1
FW	André Futh	3,704	2.5	▼2.8	2,737	1.9	▲0.5
Tierschutzallianz	Marcel Nakoinz	3,014	2.1		1,909	1.3	▼0.1
dieBasis	Bettina Graf	2,258	1.5		2,182	1.5	
Tierschutzpartei	Carina Hansen	1,969	1.3		1,966	1.3	
PARTEI					1,130	0.8	▼0.1
Gartenpartei					831	0.6	0.0
Pirates					454	0.3	
NPD					372	0.3	▼0.6
Volt					229	0.2	
du.					176	0.1	
Humanists					136	0.1	
MLPD					118	0.1	0.0
ÖDP					74	0.1	
Informal votes		1,774			1,557		
Total valid votes		146,746			146,963		
Turnout		148,520	68.9	▲0.7			
SPD gain from CDU	Majority	1,868	1.2				

=== 2017 election ===
Federal election (2017): Börde – Jerichower Land
Notes:	Blue background denotes the winner of the electorate vote. Pink background denotes a candidate elected from their party list. Yellow background denotes an electorate win by a list member, or other incumbent. A ✓ or ✗ denotes status of any incumbent, win or lose respectively.						
Party	Candidate	Votes	%	±%	Party votes	%	±%
CDU	✓ Manfred Behrens	55,110	37.8	▼6.8	47,566	32.1	▼11.1
Left	Kerstin Auerbach	29,616	20.3	▼1.1	24,555	16.6	▼5.1
SPD	Franziska Kersten	29,174	20.0	▼3.1	24,053	16.2	▼3.3
AfD					27,905	18.8	▲15.0
FDP	Christiane Fuchs	11,080	7.6	▲4.9	11,413	7.7	▲4.8
NPD	Nick-Oliver Machts	9,619	6.6		1,330	0.9	▼1.2
FW	Ines Busse	7,809	5.4	▲3.3	2,074	1.4	▲0.2
Greens	Max Schirmer	3,540	2.4	▼0.2	4,236	2.9	▼0.2
Tierschutzallianz					2,137	1.4	
PARTEI					1,313	0.9	
MG					784	0.5	
BGE					358	0.2	
DiB					213	0.1	
MLPD					151	0.1	0.0
Informal votes		4,551			2,411		
Total valid votes		145,948			148,088		
Turnout		150,499	68.2	▲6.0			
CDU hold	Majority	25,494	17.5	▼4.0			

=== 2013 election ===
Federal election (2013): Börde – Jerichower Land
Notes:	Blue background denotes the winner of the electorate vote. Pink background denotes a candidate elected from their party list. Yellow background denotes an electorate win by a list member, or other incumbent. A ✓ or ✗ denotes status of any incumbent, win or lose respectively.						
Party	Candidate	Votes	%	±%	Party votes	%	±%
CDU	✓ Manfred Behrens	61,890	44.6	▲11.9	60,207	43.2	▲11.7
SPD	Waltraud Wolff	32,118	23.1	▲0.7	27,279	19.6	▲1.7
Left	Thomas Waldheim	29,759	21.4	▼7.3	30,235	21.7	▼8.9
AfD					5,380	3.9	
Pirates	Andrea Bogner	4,224	3.0		2,556	1.8	▼0.5
FDP	Jens Ackermann	3,686	2.7	▼7.1	3,995	2.9	▼7.9
Greens	Thomas Schlenker	3,611	2.6	▼0.9	4,281	3.1	▼1.2
NPD					2,903	2.1	
FW	Rolf Wegener	2,854	2.1		1,630	1.2	
Independent	Thomas Buch	696	0.6				
PRO					458	0.3	
ÖDP					232	0.2	
MLPD					170	0.1	▼0.1
Informal votes		2,976			2,488		
Total valid votes		138,838			139,326		
Turnout		141,814	62.2	▲1.1			
CDU hold	Majority	29,772	21.5	▲17.5			

=== 2009 election ===
Federal election (2009): Börde – Jerichower Land
Notes:	Blue background denotes the winner of the electorate vote. Pink background denotes a candidate elected from their party list. Yellow background denotes an electorate win by a list member, or other incumbent. A ✓ or ✗ denotes status of any incumbent, win or lose respectively.						
Party	Candidate	Votes	%	±%	Party votes	%	±%
CDU	Manfred Behrens	46,686	32.7	▲4.6	45,060	31.5	▲4.8
Left	Thomas Waldheim	41,040	28.7	▲5.6	43,781	30.6	▲5.5
SPD	Waltraud Wolff	31,994	20.4	▼15.3	25,606	17.9	▼16.1
FDP	Jens Ackermann	13,914	9.7	▲4.5	15,368	10.7	▲3.3
Greens	Christoph Erdmenger	5,041	3.5	▲1.2	6,081	4.3	▲0.9
NPD	Stefan Träger	3,446	2.4	▼0.4	3,033	2.1	▼0.2
Pirates					3,320	2.3	
Independent	Uwe Lehmann	733	0.5				
DVU					461	0.3	
MLPD					331	0.2	0.0
Informal votes		3,411			3,224		
Total valid votes		142,854			143,041		
Turnout		146,265	61.1	▼9.9			
CDU win new seat	Majority	5,646	4.0				
