= Stadt Hecklingen =

Coordinates: 51.850°N 11.517°E

Stadt Hecklingen was a Verwaltungsgemeinschaft ("collective municipality") in the Salzlandkreis district, in Saxony-Anhalt, Germany. The seat of the Verwaltungsgemeinschaft was in Hecklingen.

It was disbanded on 1 January 2010.

The Verwaltungsgemeinschaft Stadt Hecklingen consisted of the following municipalities:

1. Giersleben
2. Hecklingen
