= Unseburg =

- Ortsteil of Bördeaue
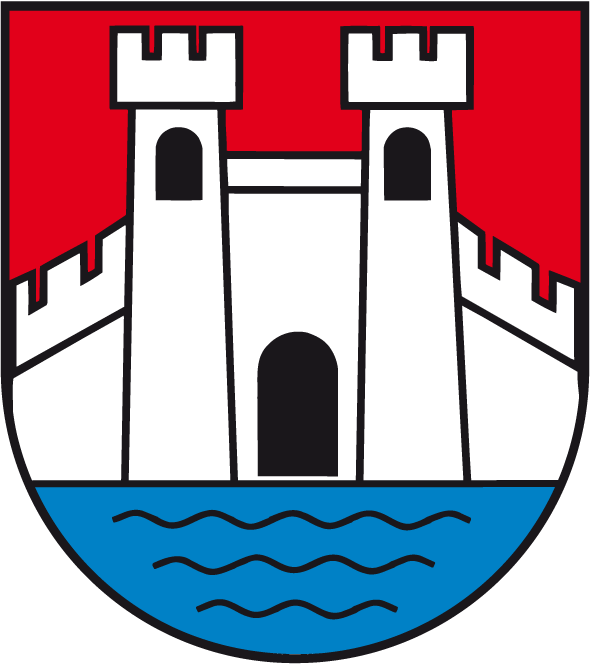
- Coat of arms
- Interactive map of Unseburg
- Location within Germany Location within Saxony-Anhalt
- Coordinates: 51°55′50″N 11°31′4″E
- Country: Germany
- State: Saxony-Anhalt
- District: Salzlandkreis
- Municipality: Bördeaue

Area
  - Total: 16.78 km^{2} (6.48 sq mi)
- Elevation: 68 m (223 ft)

Population (2006-12-31)
  - Total: 1,274
  - Density: 75.92/km^{2} (196.6/sq mi)
- Time zone: UTC+01:00 (CET)
  - Summer (DST): UTC+02:00 (CEST)
- Postal codes: 39435
- Dialling codes: 039263

Unseburg is a village and a former municipality in the district Salzlandkreis, in Saxony-Anhalt, Germany. Since 1 January 2010, it is part of the municipality Bördeaue.

== Geography ==
The Bode River passes through Unseburg but most of the town is located on its western banks with a small trucking business and residential area located on the eastern side. The town is also located at the northern foot of the Harz Mountain Range, known for its history throughout the Middle Ages such as the witch burnings and architecture of the area. The largest city near Unseburg is Magdeburg, which lies about 25 km northwest of the town. It sits in an ancient riverbed and is one of the oldest civilizations in all of Germany, with multiple archaeological expeditions being conducted there by scientists from around the world.

On January 1, 2010, the formerly independent communities of Tarthun and Unseburg united to form the municipality of Bördeaue or "Fruitful meadow"

== History ==
The first historical documentation of the town of Unseburg occurs in the church records for the foundation of towns of the Archdiocese of Magdeburg on 7 June 939 with the founding of the Unseburg Fortress. The town remained one of the few surviving in the area after the destruction of the Thirty Years' War of 1618–1648. The name Unseburg means "our castle" in Middle German - the town was once a large fortress and vital trading port due to the enormous amount of salt and brown coal in the area (the region has been known as the "Salt Land" (German: Salzland) since Viking times). Remnants of the fortress still exist, such as the bell tower of the Lutheran church that is the last surviving watchtower belonging to the fortress. The fortress-town was destroyed in the late Middle Ages after the Bishop of the Archdiocese of Magdeburg ordered a raid on the town after it was taken over by Black knights.

During World War II, ammunition, rockets and experimental jet engines were manufactured and stored outside of the town - Wernher von Braun lived there at one point. American bombers tried to bomb the factories multiple times during the war but, being located underground, the targets could not be found. Nevertheless, one damaged American B-24 Liberator that had not reached its targets in Bernburg was forced to drop its payload on the town, damaging multiple residential houses through firebombing as well as breaking several very old stained-glass windows located in the Lutheran Church. The cemetery in town contains the graves of several American and British pilots who died in combat over the skies of Egelner Mulde (this region of Germany saw some of the heaviest air-to-air combat in the whole war).

Towards the end of the war, Americans of the 83rd Infantry Division (United States) occupied Unseburg. Some of the Hitler Youth of the town desired to resist but were stopped at the last minute by a senior SA Party Member who lived in the town, knowing that resistance would be futile. Fighting in the town would have assured its destruction. Because the town escaped damage, the Americans used the town as a place of respite as well as a field hospital during the battles of Magdeburg and Barby in April 1945. Soon thereafter, Unseburg became part of the British Occupation Zone and finally it was given to the Russians along with the surrounding areas in exchange for the Russian-occupied half of Austria. All of the occupation forces ransacked the manufacturing facilities outside of the town to give them an edge in the upcoming Cold War.

== Attractions ==
Sights to see in the town include the Bode River, local Park, Kamplake Lake, Frula Juice Factory, Town Museum located in the old elementary school, numerous biking trails in the area, the American Line dance Club, yearly Christmas market, Karnival-Fasching celebrations, and the local Lutheran Church St. Stephen (Stephan) with its 12th century Tower and Building built in 1839.

== Monuments ==
On an open area at the crossing of Ernst-Thälmann-Straße, August-Bebel-Straße and Bäckergasse, there is a memorial to the Brown Coal mine "Johanne-Henriette" that was in operation from 1849 to 1963. Located in the cemetery is a monument to the dozens of soldiers from the town that were killed in World War II. There is currently a motion to restore it as well as build a new monument for the allied pilots that were buried in the area and later taken back to their home countries after the war.

== Commerce ==
The town is home to the industrial concrete magnet-manufacturing firm FTW, a local shipping truck firm and the fruit juice factory "Frula".

== Clubs ==
The Sport Fishing Club „Am Bodestrand“ 1922 Unseburg e.V. located in unseburg is a member of the State Association of Sport Fishermen. The club has about 100 members from the local area and even from the distant Harz Mountain region. Club-available waters include the 13 hectare Kamplake, the 8 hectare Westerwiese, the 2.5 hectare Holl´sche Brook, and the Bode River area between the Wolmirsleben Stappen-bridge and the Rothenförde retaining dam.

Active in the local town history is the Heimatstube Club Unseburg e.V. with its headquarters on "Schulstrasse". The Heimatstube Club runs the town museum as well in the recently closed elementary school.

== Coat of arms ==
The coat of arms of Unseburg to the right is defined as the following: "Emblazoned in red with a silver fortress with tinned walls and two tinned towers. The fortress is to have a black gate and two black windows. At the foot of the shield is the blue Bode river and black wave-lines."

It was redesigned by Jörg Mantzsch, a well known student of heraldry living in Magdeburg.

Unseburg's flag is three-striped with the colors blue-silver/white-red and has the coat of arms emblazoned upon it.
