= Staßfurt (Verwaltungsgemeinschaft) =

Municipality in Saxony-Anhalt, Germany

Coordinates: 51.867°N 11.567°E

Staßfurt was a Verwaltungsgemeinschaft ("collective municipality") in the Salzlandkreis district, in Saxony-Anhalt, Germany. The seat of the Verwaltungsgemeinschaft was in Staßfurt. It was disbanded on 1 January 2010.

The Verwaltungsgemeinschaft Staßfurt consisted of the following municipalities:

1. Amesdorf
2. Staßfurt
