= Egeln =

- Town
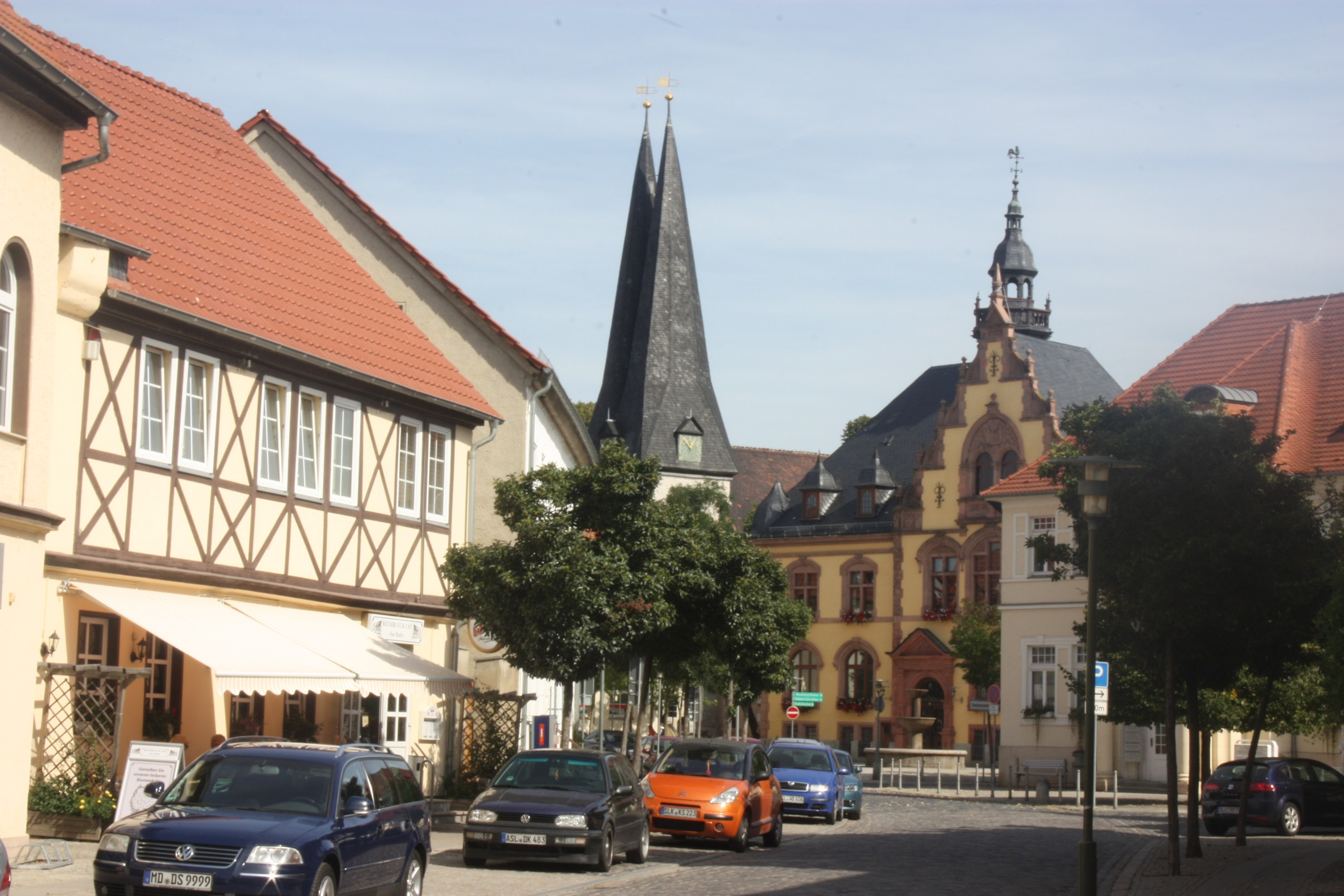
- Market square, St Christopher's Church and town hall

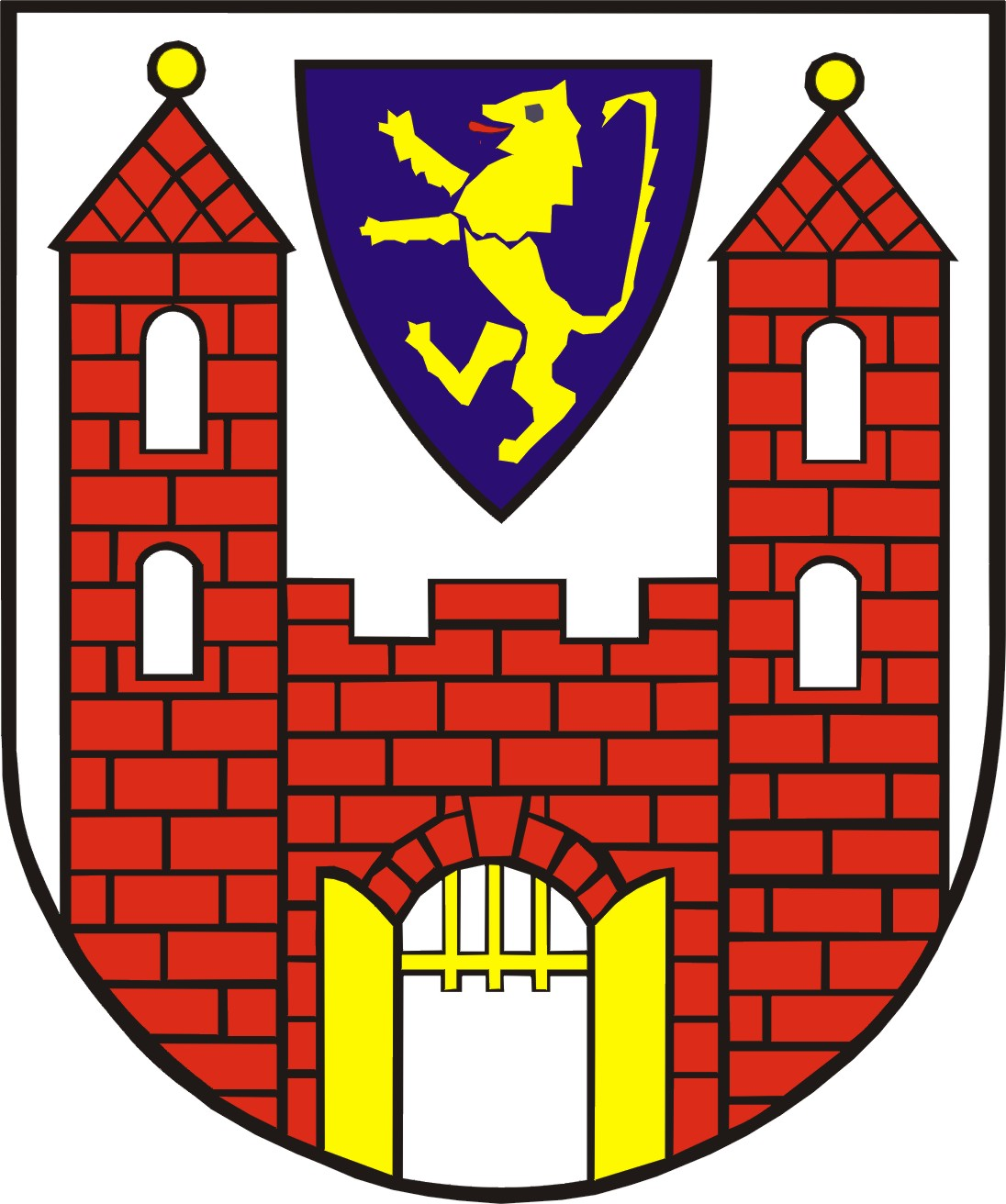
- Coat of arms

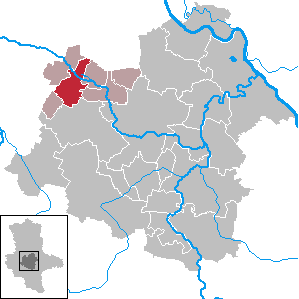
- Location of Egeln within Salzlandkreis district
- Interactive map of Egeln
- Location within Germany Location within Saxony-Anhalt
- Coordinates: 51°57′N 11°26′E
- Country: Germany
- State: Saxony-Anhalt
- District: Salzlandkreis
- Municipal assoc.: Egelner Mulde

Government
  - Mayor (2019–26): Reinhard Luckner

Area
  - Total: 29.33 km^{2} (11.32 sq mi)
- Elevation: 70 m (230 ft)

Population (2025-12-31)
  - Total: 3,032
  - Density: 103.4/km^{2} (267.7/sq mi)
- Time zone: UTC+01:00 (CET)
  - Summer (DST): UTC+02:00 (CEST)
- Postal codes: 39435
- Dialling codes: 039268
- Vehicle registration: SLK
- Website: www.egeln.info

Egeln (German pronunciation: [ˈeːɡl̩n]) is a small town in the Salzlandkreis district, in Saxony-Anhalt, Germany. It is the administrative seat of the Verbandsgemeinde ("collective municipality") Egelner Mulde.

== Geography ==
Egeln is situated on the river Bode, approx. 15 kilometres (9.3 mi) northwest of Staßfurt, and 25 km (16 mi) southwest of the state capital Magdeburg on the road to Halberstadt. A train connection to Staßfurt via Hecklingen is provided at Egeln station.

== History ==
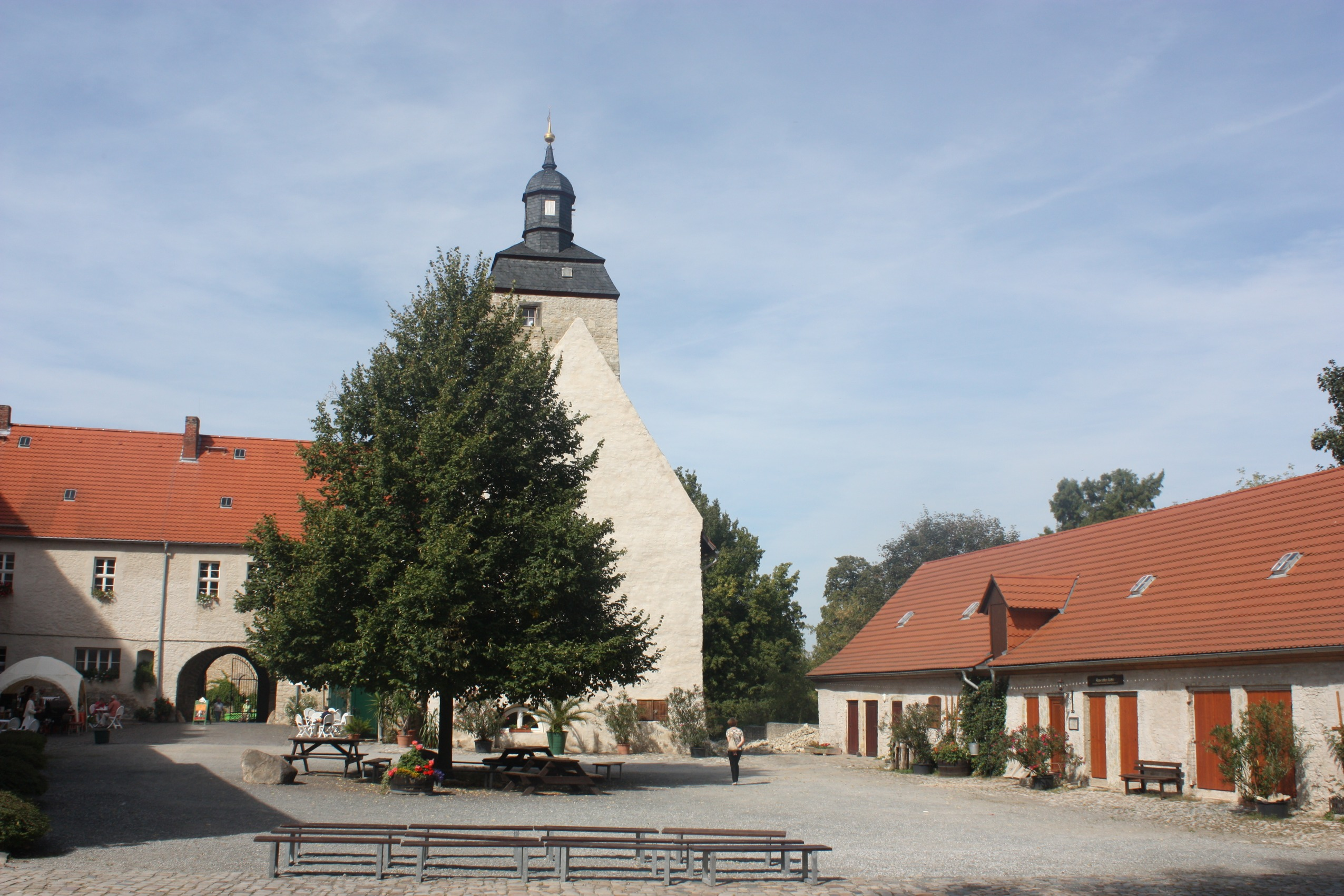
Egeln Castle, courtyard

The fertile Bode basin had been settled since the Paleolithic; the town's name may refer to Anglian tribes which in the 2nd and 3rd century AD moved from the Baltic coast southwards to present-day Thuringia. A fortification at the site named Osteregulon is mentioned in a 941 deed of donation, issued by German king Otto I when he enfeoffed Siegfried, firstborn son of Margrave Gero, with the surrounding estates. The castle secured a causeway across the Bode river, part of an important trade route from the cities of Goslar and Quedlinburg to the Ottonian residence in Magdeburg.

After Siegfried's early death, the area passed into the possessions of newly established Gernrode Abbey. Merchants and craftsmen settled there, and a fortified town was laid out in the 11th century at the behest of the Saxon counts from the Ascanian dynasty. A parish church was first mentioned in 1206. Conquered by the Lords of Hadmersleben about 1250, the Egeln citizens were vested with town privileges; Otto of Hadmersleben founded a Cistercian nunnery (Marienstuhl monastery) at the site in 1259. After the Hadmersleben dynasty became extinct in 1416, Egeln fell to the Prince-Archbishops of Magdeburg who had the castle rebuilt as a summer residence.

In the Thirty Years' War, Egeln Castle temporarily served as headquarters of the Swedish troops under Field Marshal Johan Banér. Here he met with the young nun Anna Margareta von Haugwitz, the later wife of Carl Gustaf Wrangel, and became her guardian. Part of the Prussian Duchy of Magdeburg from 1680, the demesne passed into state ownership while Egeln obtained the status of an independent city. The Marienstuhl nunnery was finally dissolved by order of the Napoleonic king Jérôme Bonaparte in 1809. After the Napoleonic Wars, Egeln was incorporated into the Prussian Province of Saxony by 1816.

After World War II, Egeln was part of East Germany and the manor became a Volkseigenes Gut ("People-Owned Property"). After German reunification, the castle complex has been extensively restored.

== International relations ==
Egeln is twinned with:

- Mûrs-Erigné (France)
- Bzenec (Czech Republic)
- Rüthen (North Rhine-Westphalia, Germany) – since 1991

== Notable people ==
- Friedrich Lücke (1791–1855), Protestant theologian, university professor and abbot of the monastery Bursfelde near Hann. Münden, Germany
- Ernst Pittschau sen. (1859–1916), father of Ernst Pittschau (1883-1951) and Werner Pittschau (1902–1928), actor at the Court Theatre (today Burgtheater) in Vienna
- Ruth Fuchs (1946–2023), javelin thrower, Olympic winner 1972 and 1976, later Member of the East German pseudo-parliament, People's Chamber; Member of the German parliament, Federal Diet and Member of the Thuringian regional parliament, Land Diet.
