= Westeregeln =

- Ortsteil of Börde-Hakel
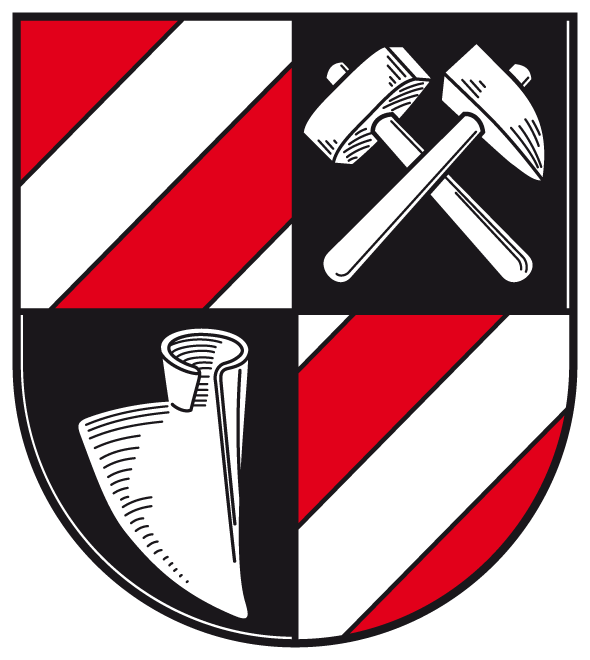
- Coat of arms
- Interactive map of Westeregeln
- Location within Germany Location within Saxony-Anhalt
- Coordinates: 51°57′43″N 11°23′21″E
- Country: Germany
- State: Saxony-Anhalt
- District: Salzlandkreis
- Municipality: Börde-Hakel

Area
  - Total: 13.94 km^{2} (5.38 sq mi)
- Elevation: 70 m (230 ft)

Population (2006-12-31)
  - Total: 2,063
  - Density: 148.0/km^{2} (383.3/sq mi)
- Time zone: UTC+01:00 (CET)
  - Summer (DST): UTC+02:00 (CEST)
- Postal codes: 39448
- Dialling codes: 039268

Westeregeln is a village and a former municipality in the district Salzlandkreis, in Saxony-Anhalt, Germany.

Since 1 January 2010, it is part of the municipality Börde-Hakel.
