= Hakeborn =

- Ortsteil of Börde-Hakel
- Coat of arms
- Interactive map of Hakeborn
- Location within Germany Location within Saxony-Anhalt
- Coordinates: 51°55′N 11°22′E
- Country: Germany
- State: Saxony-Anhalt
- District: Salzlandkreis
- Municipality: Börde-Hakel

Area
  - Total: 11.45 km^{2} (4.42 sq mi)
- Elevation: 100 m (330 ft)

Population (2006-12-31)
  - Total: 805
  - Density: 70.3/km^{2} (182/sq mi)
- Time zone: UTC+01:00 (CET)
  - Summer (DST): UTC+02:00 (CEST)
- Postal codes: 39448
- Dialling codes: 039268

Hakeborn is a village and a former municipality in the district Salzlandkreis, in Saxony-Anhalt, Germany.

Since 1 January 2010, it is part of the municipality Börde-Hakel.
