= Schliesing =

Schliesing is a surname of German origin. It could refer to:

- David Schliesing (born 1983), German actor and politician
- Jannis Schliesing (born 1992), German footballer

== See also ==
- Schlesinger
