= Borne, Germany =

Borne, Germany may refer to:

- Borne, a district of Bad Belzig, Brandenburg
- Borne, Saxony-Anhalt
