= Sven Rosomkiewicz =

German politician (born 1986)

Member of the Landtag of Saxony-Anhalt
- Incumbent
- Assumed office 6 June 2021
- Preceded by: Matthias Büttner
- Constituency: Staßfurt

Personal details
- Born: 1986 (age 39–40) Staßfurt
- Party: Christian Democratic Union (since 2003)

Sven Rosomkiewicz (born 1986 in Staßfurt) is a German politician serving as a member of the Landtag of Saxony-Anhalt since 2021. He has served as mayor of Borne since 2015.
