= Anna Aeikens =

German politician (born 1998)

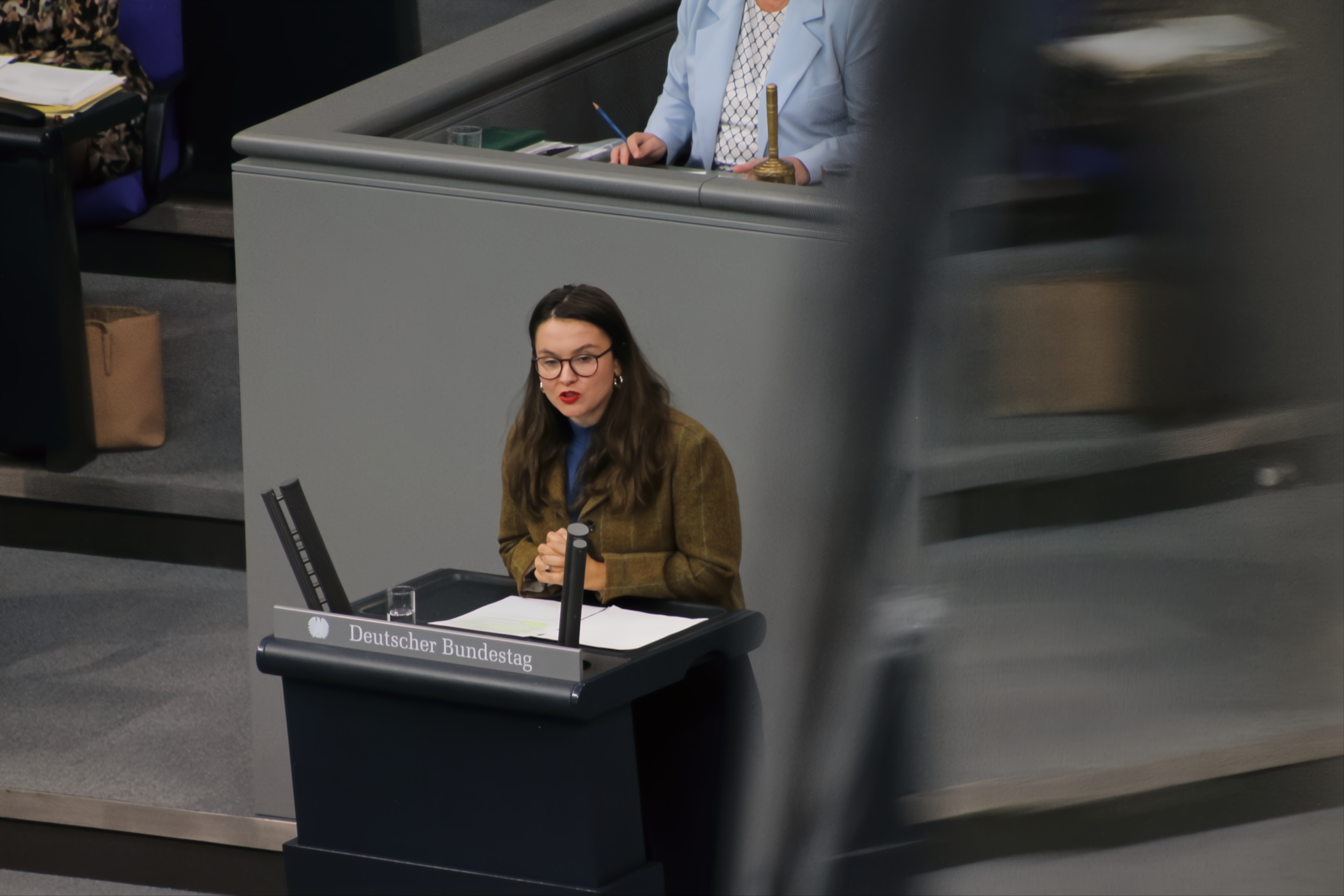
- Aeikens speaking in the Bundestag in 2025

Member of the Bundestag
- Incumbent
- Assumed office 25 March 2025
- Constituency: Saxony-Anhalt

Personal details
- Born: 15 August 1998 (age 28) Magdeburg, Germany
- Party: Christian Democratic Union
- Relatives: Hermann Onko Aeikens (father)
- Education: University of Göttingen (BSc); UCLouvain (MSc); University of Bonn (MSc)

Anna Elisabeth Christine Sophie Aeikens (born 15 August 1998) is a German politician of the Christian Democratic Union (CDU) who has been serving as a member of the Bundestag since the 2025 federal election. She has also been a member of the federal board of the Young Union since 2026.

== Early life and education ==
Aeikens was born in 1998 in Magdeburg. Her father is agronomist and CDU politician Hermann Onko Aeikens. She attended the Landesschule Pforta, where she graduated in 2017.

From 2017 to 2021, Aeikens studied agricultural sciences at the University of Göttingen on a scholarship from the Konrad Adenauer Foundation. She later earned a master's degree in agricultural, food and environmental policy analysis through a double-degree programme of UCLouvain and the University of Bonn (2021–2023). During her studies, she interned in the Berlin office of Manfred Behrens.

== Early career ==
From 2022 to 2024, Aeikens worked for a Member of the European Parliament in Brussels and Strasbourg, first as a student assistant and from 2023 as an accredited parliamentary assistant. In this capacity, she covered the Committee on Regional Development and its links to agricultural policy.

In 2024, Aeikens co-founded the agricultural consultancy Aeikens & Kraft with Katrin Kraft and served as its co-managing director. She stepped down from the role upon entering parliament and, by her own account, no longer draws a salary or a share of profits from the firm.

== Political career ==
=== Career in party politics ===
Aeikens joined the CDU and the Young Union in 2017. Within the Young Union, she has been a member of the board in the Börde district since 2021. She also served on the board of the organisation's Saxony-Anhalt chapter from 2021 to 2023 and has been its treasurer since 2023. At the 2026 Deutschlandtag in Bonn, she was elected to the Young Union's federal board.

Within the CDU, Aeikens has been a member of the Mittelstands- und Wirtschaftsunion (MIT), the party's association for small and medium-sized businesses, and of the board of the Women's Union in Saxony-Anhalt since 2024. Since 2025, she has been serving as deputy chair of the CDU in the Börde district. She is also a member of the German Agricultural Society (DLG).

=== Member of the Bundestag ===
Aeikens ran in the Börde – Salzlandkreis constituency in the 2025 federal election but lost to Jan Wenzel Schmidt of the Alternative for Germany, receiving 22.4 percent of the vote. She instead entered parliament through the CDU's state list for Saxony-Anhalt, on which she had been placed third.

In parliament, Aeikens has since been serving on the Committee on Agriculture, Food and Regional Identity and the Committee on the Environment, Climate Action, Nature Conservation and Nuclear Safety, where she focuses on agricultural policy. She is also a substitute member of the Committee on Housing, Urban Development, Building and Local Government and serves as one of the secretaries of the Bundestag. In addition to her committee assignments, she is part of the German delegation to the Franco-German Parliamentary Assembly.

Within the CDU/CSU parliamentary group, Aeikens serves as deputy chair of the Young Group (Junge Gruppe). She also belongs to the Parliamentary Group Mittelstand (PKM), which focuses on the concerns of small and medium-sized enterprises.
