= Neundorf =

Neundorf may refer to the following places in Germany:

- Neundorf, Saxony-Anhalt, in the Salzlandkreis, Saxony-Anhalt
- Neundorf bei Lobenstein, in the Saale-Orla-Kreis, Thuringia
- Neundorf bei Schleiz, in the Saale-Orla-Kreis, Thuringia
- Neundorf (Pirna), a subdivision of Pirna, Saxony
- Neundorf auf dem Eigen, part of Herrnhut, Saxony
