= Förderstedt =

- Stadtteil of Staßfurt
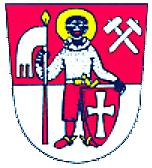
- Coat of arms
- Interactive map of Förderstedt
- Location within Germany Location within Saxony-Anhalt
- Coordinates: 51°53′N 11°37′E
- Country: Germany
- State: Saxony-Anhalt
- District: Salzlandkreis
- Town: Staßfurt

Area
  - Total: 73.42 km^{2} (28.35 sq mi)
- Elevation: 67 m (220 ft)

Population (2006-12-31)
  - Total: 5,814
  - Density: 79.19/km^{2} (205.1/sq mi)
- Time zone: UTC+01:00 (CET)
  - Summer (DST): UTC+02:00 (CEST)
- Postal codes: 39443
- Dialling codes: 039266, 03925
- Vehicle registration: SLK

Förderstedt is a village and a former municipality in the district of Salzlandkreis, in Saxony-Anhalt, Germany. Since 1 January 2009, it is part of the town Staßfurt.
