= Siedentopf (surname) =

Siedentopf is a surname, and may refer to:

- Henry Siedentopf
- Max Siedentopf
- Fritz Siedentopf
- Heinrich Siedentopf
