= Königstein (Westerhausen) =

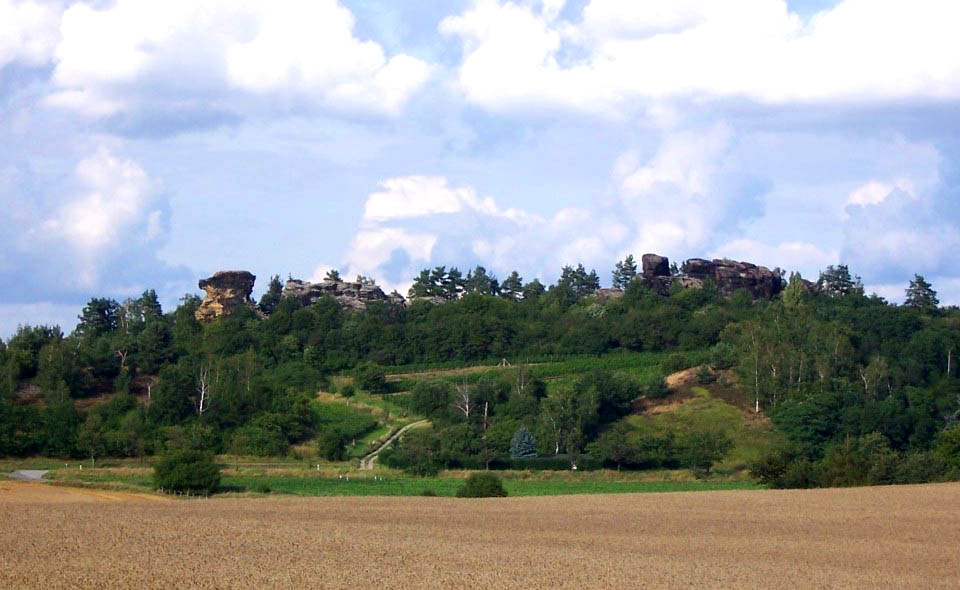
- The Königstein from the south

Highest point
- Elevation: 189 m (620 ft)
- Coordinates: 51°48′46″N 11°03′01″E

Geography
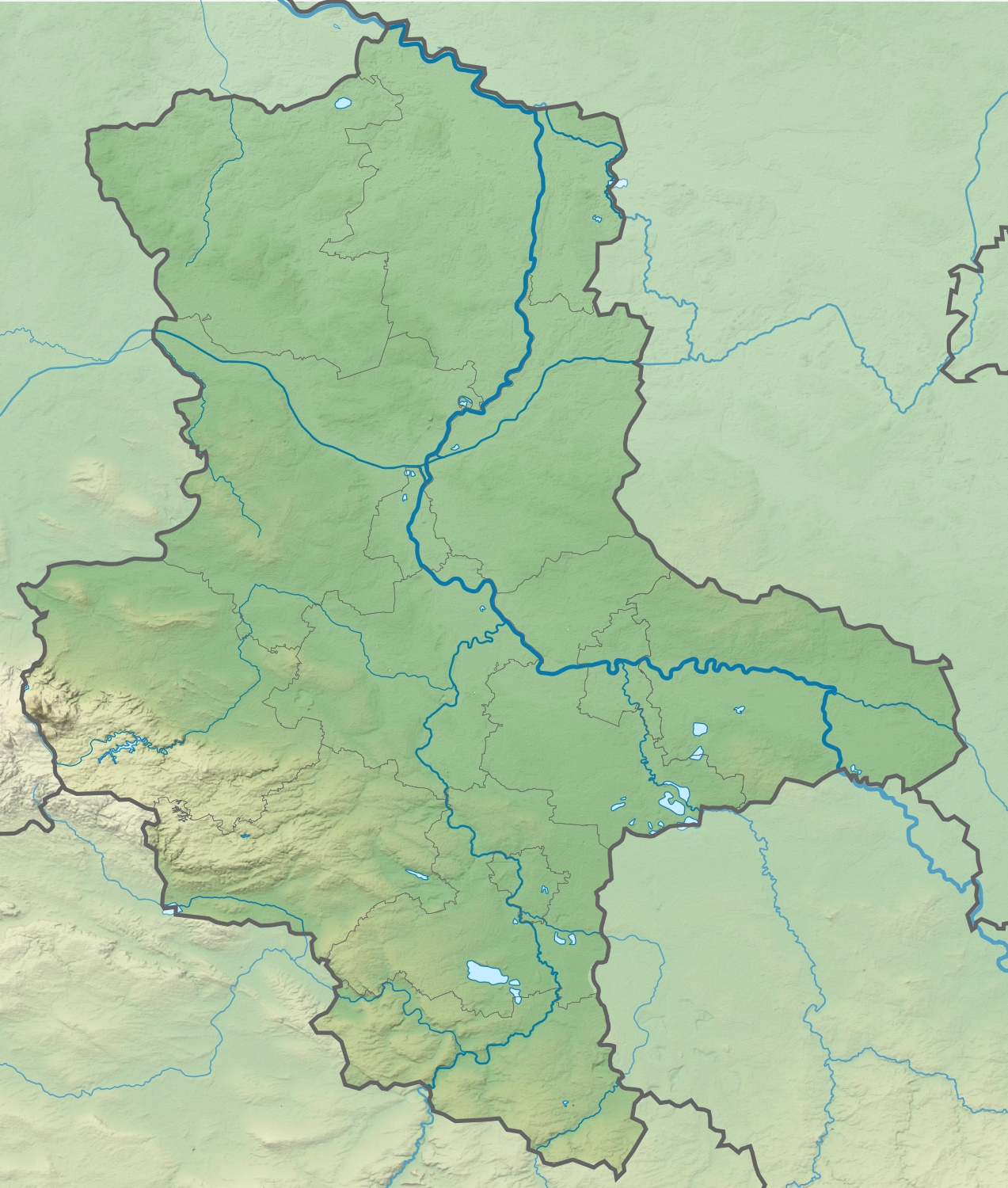
- Location within Saxony-Anhalt
- Location: Westerhausen, Saxony-Anhalt
- Parent range: Harz Mountains

The Königstein (German pronunciation: [ˈkøːniçʃtaɪn] or [ˈkøːnikʃtaɪn]) is a 189 m high hill in the northern Harz Foreland in the German state of Saxony-Anhalt. It is also known as the Kamelfelsen ("Camel Rocks") due to its unusually shaped sandstone rock formation.

== Location and area ==
The Königstein lies in the northern Harz Foreland, northwest of Westerhausen (near Quedlinburg) on the road towards Börnecke. Its neighbouring hill to the northwest is the 178 m high Jätchenberg. The federal road B 6n runs by to the north. The Königstein is a ridge running from northwest to southeast. Its northeastern flank is relatively steep, but its southwestern slopes fall away much more gently. It is mostly covered in deciduous forest. The vineyard on the southern slopes of the Königstein belongs to the Saale-Unstrut wine-growing area. The crest of the ridge is dominated by the striking Kamelfelsen rocks, whose name derives from their shape: seen from the south or north they are supposed to resemble two camels lying down.

== The Kamelfelsen ==
The Kamelfelsen consist of hardened sandstone, which also has very soft and crumbly sections. This rock formation, like the well-known Teufelsmauer, was created as a result of the formation of the fault-block mountains of the Harz and the earth movements in the northern Harz Foreland resulting from it. Like the nearby Teufelsmauer, the Königstein is a "rib" of harder rock (Schichtrippe) from the Lower Cretaceous. The Königstein was first placed under protection as a geological feature in 1932 and has been registered as a natural monument since 1997. There are several climbing routes on the Kamelfelsen up to climbing grade VIIIb (Saxon grading).

== History ==
The Königstein was probably used during the Stone Age as a cult site, and Germanic summer solstice celebrations may have taken place here,. The "sun discs" (Sonnenräder) on the rocks - circular shapes cut into the rock, about 1 metre or more in diameter which are distributed around the lower part of the rocks on their northern side - are artifacts resulting from the production of millstones. There are also several archaeological sites in the immediate vicinity. The last important find was made during the construction of the German federal road B 6n which runs close by the site.
