= Etgersleben =

- Ortsteil of Börde-Hakel
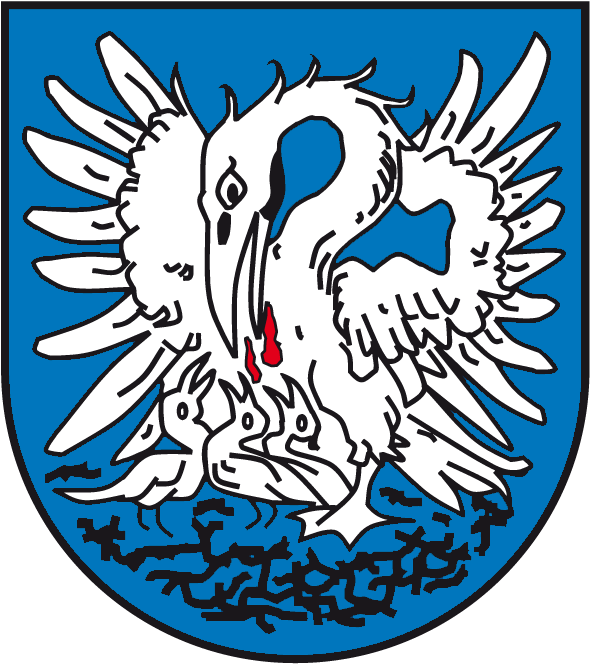
- Coat of arms
- Interactive map of Etgersleben
- Location within Germany Location within Saxony-Anhalt
- Coordinates: 51°58′53″N 11°24′39″E
- Country: Germany
- State: Saxony-Anhalt
- District: Salzlandkreis
- Municipality: Börde-Hakel

Area
  - Total: 13.26 km^{2} (5.12 sq mi)
- Elevation: 88 m (289 ft)

Population (2006-12-31)
  - Total: 798
  - Density: 60.2/km^{2} (156/sq mi)
- Time zone: UTC+01:00 (CET)
  - Summer (DST): UTC+02:00 (CEST)
- Postal codes: 39448
- Dialling codes: 039268

Etgersleben is a village and a former municipality in the district Salzlandkreis, in Saxony-Anhalt, Germany.

Since 1 January 2010, it is part of the municipality Börde-Hakel.
