= Wolmirsleben =

- Municipality
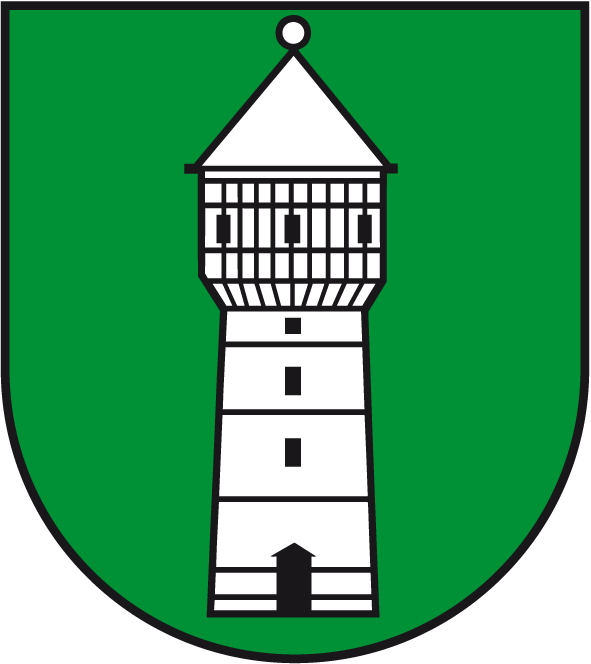
- Coat of arms

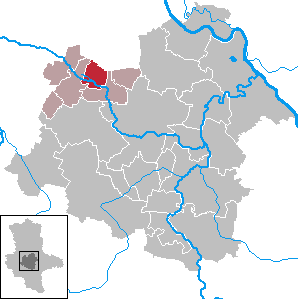
- Location of Wolmirsleben within Salzlandkreis district
- Interactive map of Wolmirsleben
- Location within Germany Location within Saxony-Anhalt
- Coordinates: 51°57′N 11°29′E
- Country: Germany
- State: Saxony-Anhalt
- District: Salzlandkreis
- Municipal assoc.: Egelner Mulde

Government
  - Mayor (2023–30): Knut Kluczka

Area
  - Total: 16.90 km^{2} (6.53 sq mi)
- Elevation: 77 m (253 ft)

Population (2025-12-31)
  - Total: 1,388
  - Density: 82.13/km^{2} (212.7/sq mi)
- Time zone: UTC+01:00 (CET)
  - Summer (DST): UTC+02:00 (CEST)
- Postal codes: 39435
- Dialling codes: 039268
- Vehicle registration: SLK
- Website: www.wolmirsleben.de

Wolmirsleben is a municipality in the district of Salzlandkreis, in Saxony-Anhalt, Germany. It is about 25 kilometres south-west of Magdeburg. It has a population of 1417 as of 2016. It is first mentioned in historical records in 937 with the name Wilmersleve, varying only slightly over the next fifty years. In 1144 records show it as being named Wilmarslope, and in 1214 as Wolmersleve. The tower on the local coat of arms is the still functioning local water tower.
