= Bernburg (Verwaltungsgemeinschaft) =

Coordinates: 51.800°N 11.733°E

Bernburg was a Verwaltungsgemeinschaft ("collective municipality") in the Salzlandkreis district, in Saxony-Anhalt, Germany. The seat of the Verwaltungsgemeinschaft was in Bernburg. It was disbanded on 1 January 2010.

The Verwaltungsgemeinschaft Bernburg consisted of the following municipalities:

1. Bernburg
2. Gröna
