= Tarthun =

- Ortsteil of Bördeaue
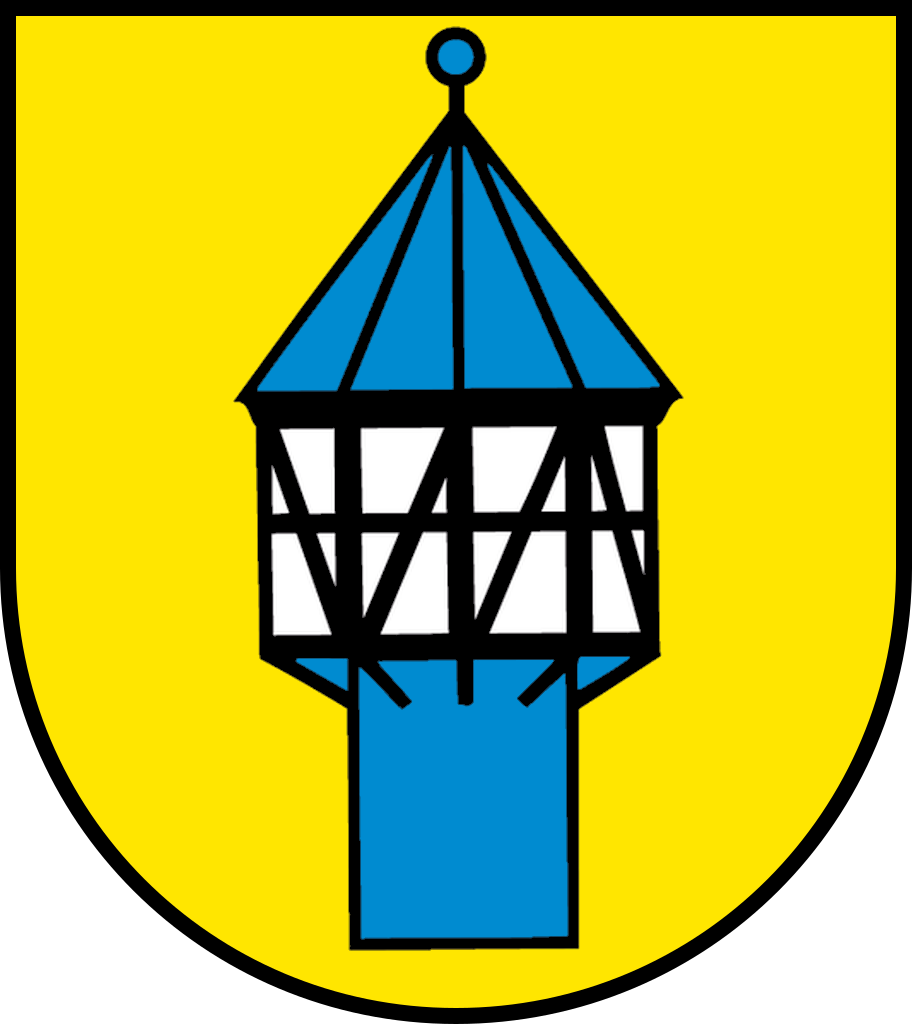
- Coat of arms
- Interactive map of Tarthun
- Location within Germany Location within Saxony-Anhalt
- Coordinates: 51°55′50″N 11°28′22″E
- Country: Germany
- State: Saxony-Anhalt
- District: Salzlandkreis
- Municipality: Bördeaue

Area
  - Total: 8.62 km^{2} (3.33 sq mi)
- Elevation: 67 m (220 ft)

Population (2006-12-31)
  - Total: 814
  - Density: 94.4/km^{2} (245/sq mi)
- Time zone: UTC+01:00 (CET)
  - Summer (DST): UTC+02:00 (CEST)
- Postal codes: 39435
- Dialling codes: 039268
- Vehicle registration: SLK

Tarthun is a village and a former municipality in the district Salzlandkreis, in Saxony-Anhalt, Germany.

Since 1 January 2010, it is part of the municipality Bördeaue.
