= Bördeaue =

- Municipality
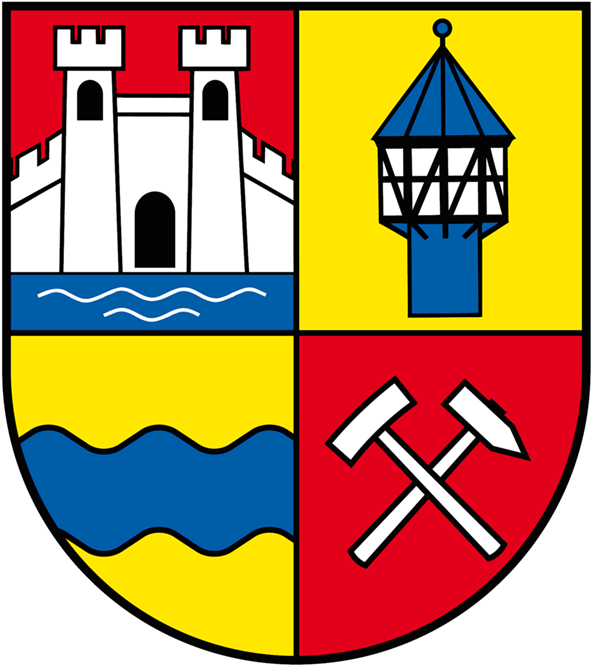
- Coat of arms

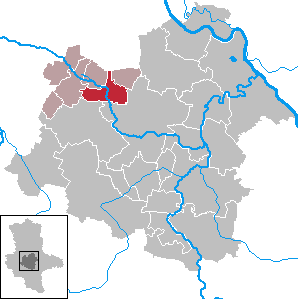
- Location of Bördeaue within Salzlandkreis district
- Interactive map of Bördeaue
- Location within Germany Location within Saxony-Anhalt
- Coordinates: 51°56′N 11°30′E
- Country: Germany
- State: Saxony-Anhalt
- District: Salzlandkreis
- Municipal assoc.: Egelner Mulde

Government
  - Mayor (2023–30): Peter Fries

Area
  - Total: 25.4 km^{2} (9.8 sq mi)
- Elevation: 67 m (220 ft)

Population (2025-12-31)
  - Total: 1,727
  - Density: 68.0/km^{2} (176/sq mi)
- Time zone: UTC+01:00 (CET)
  - Summer (DST): UTC+02:00 (CEST)
- Postal codes: 39435
- Dialling codes: 039263, 039268
- Vehicle registration: SLK
- Website: www.egelnermulde.de

Bördeaue is a municipality in the district of Salzlandkreis, in Saxony-Anhalt, Germany. It was formed on 1 January 2010 by the merger of the former municipalities Unseburg and Tarthun.
