= Neundorf, Saxony-Anhalt =

Neundorf
- Stadtteil of Staßfurt
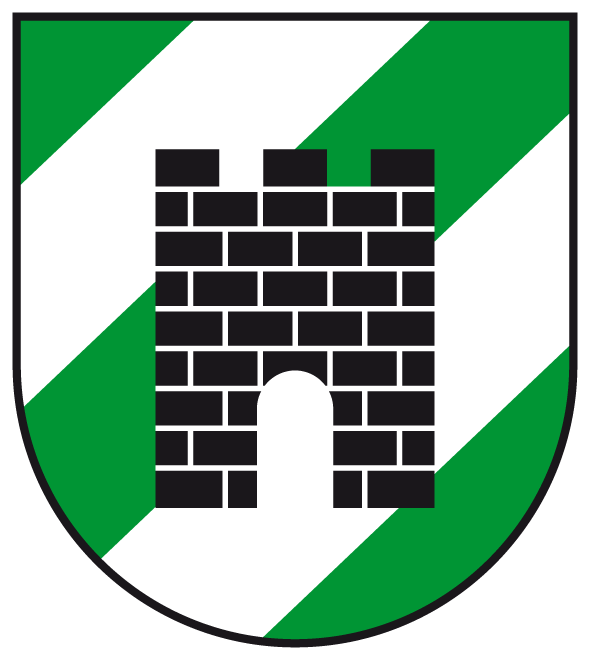
- Coat of arms
- Interactive map of Neundorf
- Location within Germany Location within Saxony-Anhalt
- Coordinates: 51°49′N 11°34′E
- Country: Germany
- State: Saxony-Anhalt
- District: Salzlandkreis
- Town: Staßfurt

Area
  - Total: 14.93 km^{2} (5.76 sq mi)
- Elevation: 74 m (243 ft)

Population (2006-12-31)
  - Total: 2,245
  - Density: 150.4/km^{2} (389.5/sq mi)
- Time zone: UTC+01:00 (CET)
  - Summer (DST): UTC+02:00 (CEST)
- Postal codes: 39418
- Dialling codes: 03925
- Vehicle registration: SLK

Neundorf (German pronunciation: [ˈnɔʏndɔʁf]) is a village and a former municipality in the district of Salzlandkreis, in Saxony-Anhalt, Germany. Since 1 January 2009, it is part of the town Staßfurt.
