= Börde-Hakel =

- Municipality
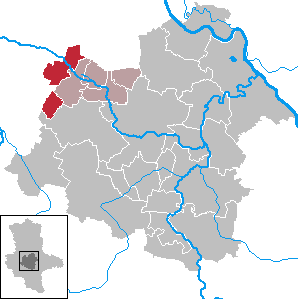
- Location of Börde-Hakel within Salzlandkreis district
- Interactive map of Börde-Hakel
- Location within Germany Location within Saxony-Anhalt
- Coordinates: 51°58′N 11°24′E
- Country: Germany
- State: Saxony-Anhalt
- District: Salzlandkreis
- Municipal assoc.: Egelner Mulde

Government
  - Mayor (2023–30): Tim Heberling

Area
  - Total: 38.65 km^{2} (14.92 sq mi)

Population (2025-12-31)
  - Total: 2,847
  - Density: 73.66/km^{2} (190.8/sq mi)
- Time zone: UTC+01:00 (CET)
  - Summer (DST): UTC+02:00 (CEST)
- Postal codes: 39448
- Dialling codes: 039268
- Vehicle registration: SLK
- Website: www.egelnermulde.de

Börde-Hakel is a municipality in the district of Salzlandkreis, in Saxony-Anhalt, Germany. It was formed on 1 January 2010 by the merger of the former municipalities Etgersleben, Hakeborn and Westeregeln.
