= Franziska Kersten =

German politician

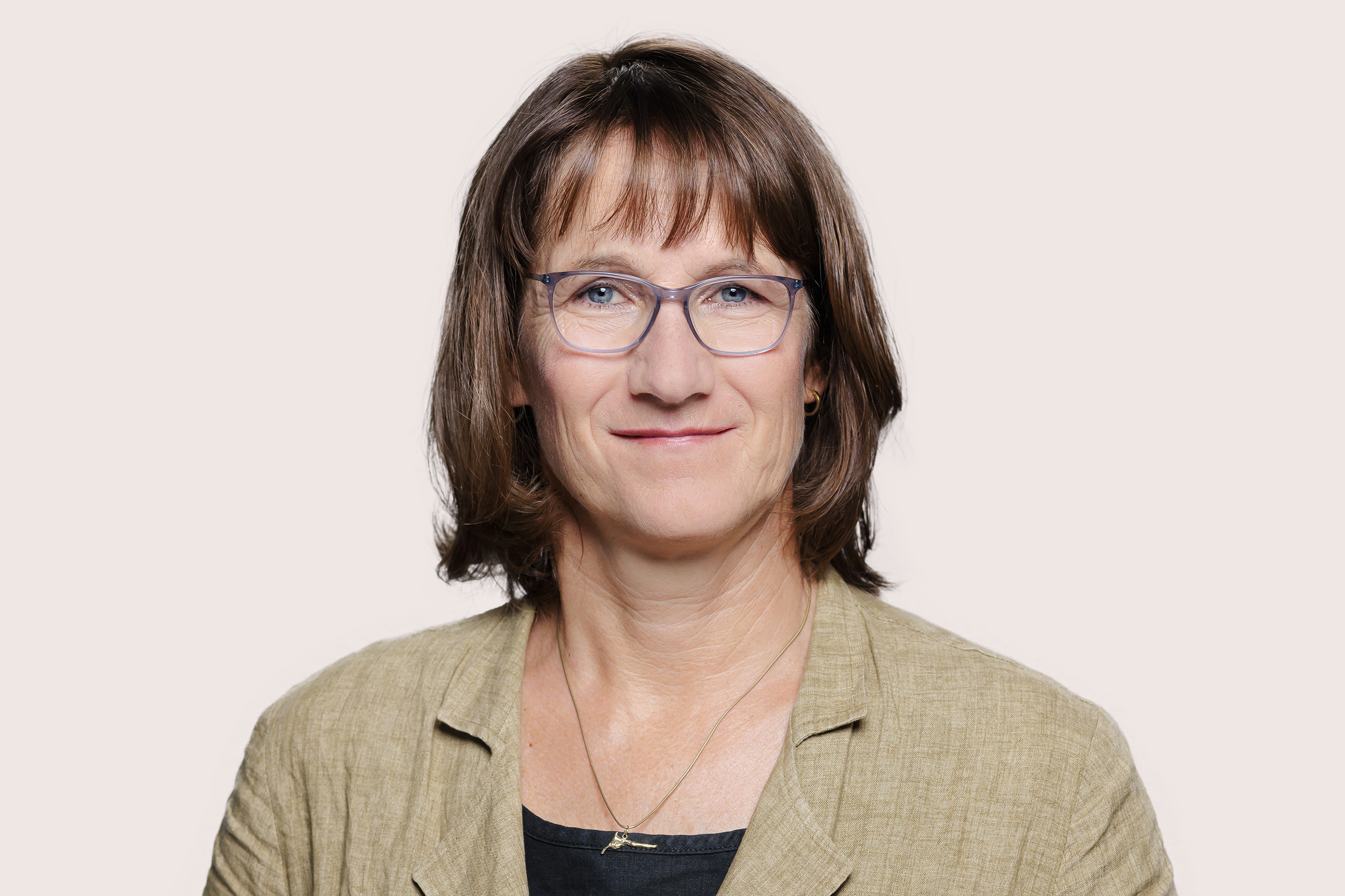

Member of the Bundestag
- Incumbent
- Assumed office 2021

Personal details
- Born: 19 December 1968 (age 57) Lutherstadt Wittenberg, East Germany (now Germany)
- Party: SPD
- Education: University of Leipzig
- Occupation: Veterinarian

Franziska Kersten (born 19 December 1968) is a German veterinarian and politician of the Social Democratic Party (SPD) who has been serving as a member of the Bundestag since 2021, representing the Börde – Jerichower Land district.

== Early life and career ==
Kersten was born in 1968 in the East German town of Lutherstadt Wittenberg and grew up in Pretzsch, Wittenberg. She studied veterinary medicine at the University of Leipzig.

From 2019 to 2020, Kersten served as vice president of the German Environment Agency (UBA). From 2020 to 2021, she worked at the Federal Ministry for the Environment, Nature Conservation and Nuclear Safety.

== Political career ==
Kersten was elected directly to the Bundestag in the 2021 federal elections. In the negotiations to form a so-called traffic light coalition of the SPD, the Green Party and the Free Democratic Party (FDP) following the elections, she was part of her party's delegation in the working group on agriculture and nutrition, co-chaired by Till Backhaus, Renate Künast and Carina Konrad.

In parliament, Kersten has since been serving on the Committee on the Environment, Nature Conservation, Nuclear Safety and Consumer Protection, the Committee on Food and Agriculture and the Parliamentary Advisory Council on Sustainable Development. Within her parliamentary group, she is part of working groups on criminal policy and on the environment, nature conservation, nuclear safety and consumer protection.

In addition to her committee assignments, Kersten has been a member of the German delegation to the Franco-German Parliamentary Assembly. She has also been an alternate member of the German delegation to the Parliamentary Assembly of the Council of Europe (PACE) since 2022. In the Assembly, she serves on the Committee on Social Affairs, Health and Sustainable Development; the Committee on Culture, Science, Education and Media; and the Sub-Committee on Culture, Diversity and Heritage.

In the negotiations to form a Grand Coalition under the leadership of Friedrich Merz's Christian Democrats (CDU together with the Bavarian CSU) and the SPD following the 2025 German elections, Kersten led the SPD delegation in the working group on rural areas, agriculture, nutrition and the environment; her counterparts from the other parties were Steffen Bilger and Artur Auernhammer.

== Other activities ==
- International Federation for Equestrian Sports (FEI), Member

== Personal life ==
Kersten is married to a fellow veterinarian.
