= Amesdorf =

- Stadtteil of Güsten
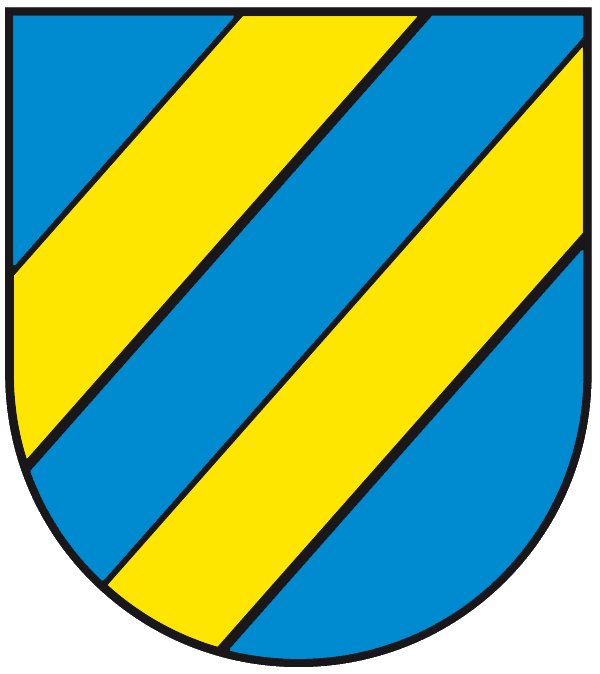
- Coat of arms
- Interactive map of Amesdorf
- Location within Germany Location within Saxony-Anhalt
- Coordinates: 51°46′48″N 11°35′48″E
- Country: Germany
- State: Saxony-Anhalt
- District: Salzlandkreis
- Town: Güsten

Area
  - Total: 11.91 km^{2} (4.60 sq mi)
- Elevation: 126 m (413 ft)

Population (2006-12-31)
  - Total: 812
  - Density: 68.2/km^{2} (177/sq mi)
- Time zone: UTC+01:00 (CET)
  - Summer (DST): UTC+02:00 (CEST)
- Postal codes: 39439
- Dialling codes: 039262

Amesdorf is a village and a former municipality in the district Salzlandkreis, in Saxony-Anhalt, Germany. Since 1 January 2010, it is part of the town Güsten.
