= Giersleben =

- Municipality
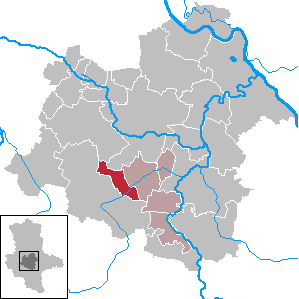
- Location of Giersleben within Salzlandkreis district
- Interactive map of Giersleben
- Location within Germany Location within Saxony-Anhalt
- Coordinates: 51°45′50″N 11°33′43″E
- Country: Germany
- State: Saxony-Anhalt
- District: Salzlandkreis
- Municipal assoc.: Saale-Wipper

Government
  - Mayor (2020–27): Peter Rietsch

Area
  - Total: 20.14 km^{2} (7.78 sq mi)
- Elevation: 128 m (420 ft)

Population (2025-12-31)
  - Total: 905
  - Density: 44.9/km^{2} (116/sq mi)
- Time zone: UTC+01:00 (CET)
  - Summer (DST): UTC+02:00 (CEST)
- Postal codes: 06449
- Dialling codes: 034746
- Vehicle registration: SLK

Giersleben is a municipality in the district of Salzlandkreis, in Saxony-Anhalt, Germany.
