= Ilberstedt =

- Municipality
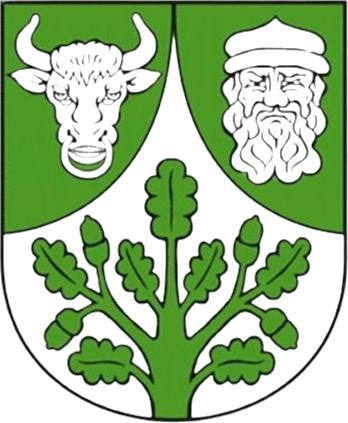
- Coat of arms

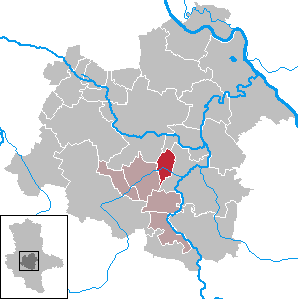
- Location of Ilberstedt within Salzlandkreis district
- Interactive map of Ilberstedt
- Location within Germany Location within Saxony-Anhalt
- Coordinates: 51°48′N 11°40′E
- Country: Germany
- State: Saxony-Anhalt
- District: Salzlandkreis
- Municipal assoc.: Saale-Wipper
- Subdivisions: 2

Government
  - Mayor (2022–29): Lothar Jänsch

Area
  - Total: 14.93 km^{2} (5.76 sq mi)
- Elevation: 70 m (230 ft)

Population (2025-12-31)
  - Total: 926
  - Density: 62.0/km^{2} (161/sq mi)
- Time zone: UTC+01:00 (CET)
  - Summer (DST): UTC+02:00 (CEST)
- Postal codes: 06408
- Dialling codes: 03471
- Vehicle registration: SLK

Ilberstedt is a municipality in the district of Salzlandkreis, in Saxony-Anhalt, Germany.
