= Thale (Verwaltungsgemeinschaft) =

Municipality in Harz, Saxony-Anhalt, Germany

Coordinates: 51.750°N 11.050°E

Thale is a former Verwaltungsgemeinschaft ("collective municipality") in the district of Harz, in Saxony-Anhalt, Germany. The seat of the Verwaltungsgemeinschaft was in Thale. It was disbanded in September 2010.

The Verwaltungsgemeinschaft Thale consisted of the following municipalities:

1. Thale
2. Westerhausen
