= Fritz Siedentopf =

German communist and resistance fighter (1908–1944)

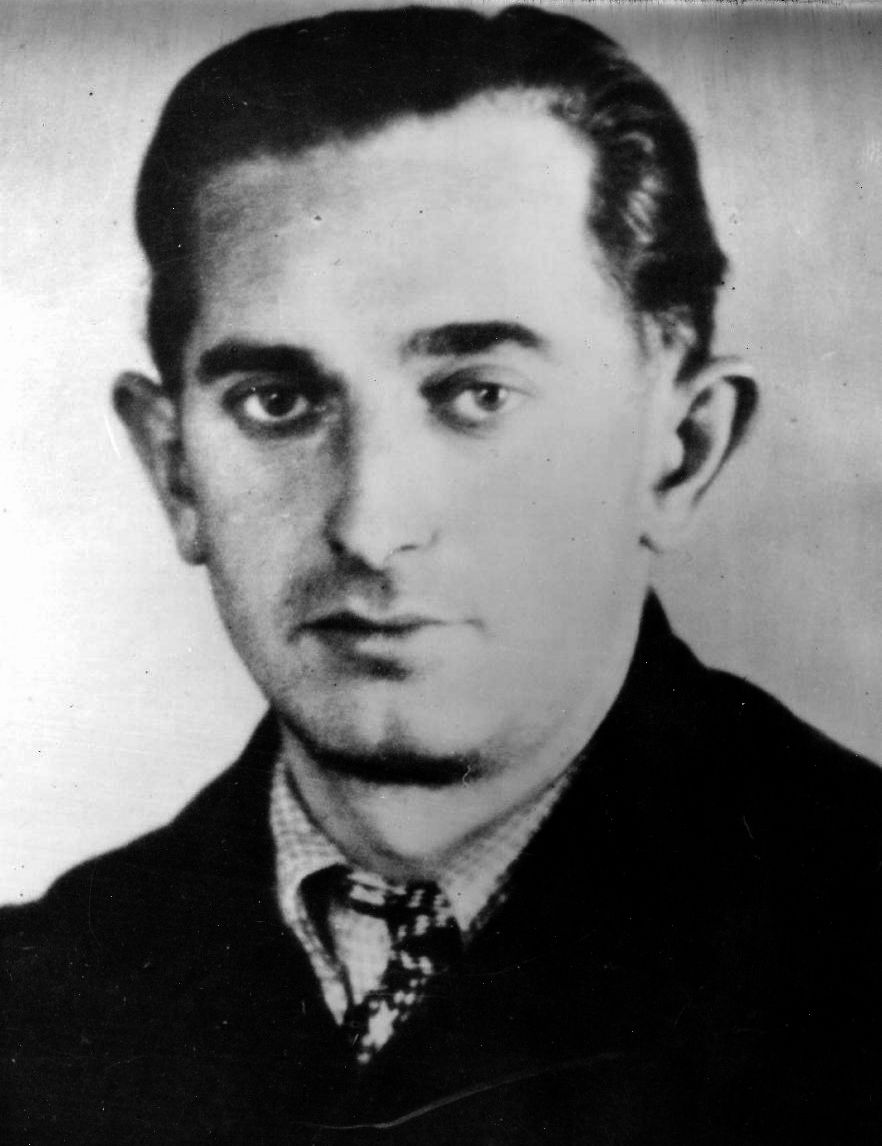
Fritz Siedentopf

Fritz Siedentopf (14 April 1908 – 28 August 1944) was a German communist and resistance fighter against Nazism.

== Biography ==
Siedentopf, a locksmith, was born in Güsten and moved to Berlin after the death of his parents in the early 1930s. In 1932 he joined the Communist Party of Germany (KPD). After the Nazi Party came to power in 1933, he was tasked with producing illegal anti-fascist pamphlets and newspapers.

On 18 August 1934 Siedentopf was arrested, and on 13 December he was sentenced to four years' imprisonment for "preparation for high treason". After his release on 22 December 1938, he joined the resistance group of Robert Uhrig, whom he had met while in prison; Siedentopf was mainly responsible for organizing sabotage of German industry.

Siedentopf was arrested once again by the Gestapo on 4 February 1942, amid a wave of arrests of resistance members, and held in Sachsenhausen concentration camp, Plötzensee Prison and Landsberg an der Warthe. On 15 February 1944 he was charged with "preparation for high treason" and "aiding the enemy in war time", and on 6 July he was sentenced to death by the People's Court in Potsdam. Siedentopf was executed by guillotine on 28 August 1944 in Brandenburg-Görden Prison.
