= Westerhausen =

- Stadtteil of Thale
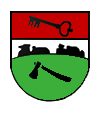
- Coat of arms
- Interactive map of Westerhausen
- Location within Germany Location within Saxony-Anhalt
- Coordinates: 51°48′N 11°4′E
- Country: Germany
- State: Saxony-Anhalt
- District: Harz
- Municipal assoc.: Thale
- Town: Thale

Area
  - Total: 17.42 km^{2} (6.73 sq mi)
- Elevation: 166 m (545 ft)

Population (2009-12-31)
  - Total: 2,092
  - Density: 120.1/km^{2} (311.0/sq mi)
- Time zone: UTC+01:00 (CET)
  - Summer (DST): UTC+02:00 (CEST)
- Postal codes: 06484
- Dialling codes: 03946
- Vehicle registration: HZ

Westerhausen (German pronunciation: [vɛstɐˈhaʊzn̩]) is a village and a former municipality in the district of Harz, in Saxony-Anhalt, Germany. Since 1 September 2010, it is part of the town Thale.

== Nature conservation ==
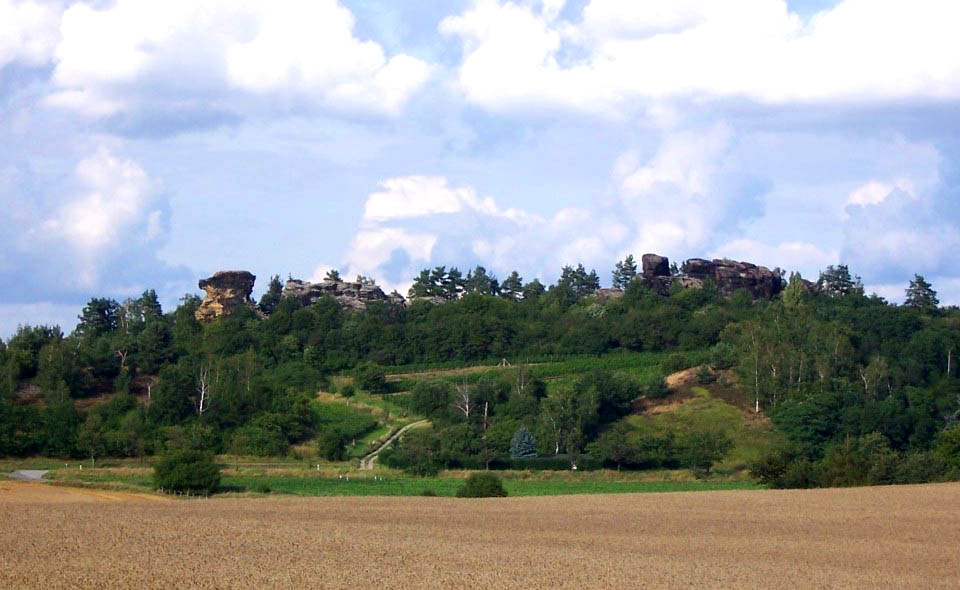
Königstein near Westerhausen, also called the Kamelfelsen or Großes Kamel. A landmark of the village.

The parish of Westerhausen lies in the landscape protection area of Harz und Vorländer (formerly the Northern Harz Foreland).

Part of it belongs to the following nature reserves (in brackets: year the reserve was created):

Harslebener Berge und Steinholz (1967). [1]

The Seggen- und binsenreiche Nasswiesen in Helsunger Bruch are a protected biotope (1999).

Natural monument area sites are the Acker Helmstein (1990), Alte Torfstich im Helsunger Bruch (1994, changed in 1996), Königstein (Großes Kamel), 189 m NN, (1932, natural monument in 1965, area monument in 1997) and Hirtenwiese (2000).

Others are the Dalgenberg (1965), Kuckucksberg (1965) and Kleine Kamel (1965, prepared since 1927).
