= Güsten =

- Town
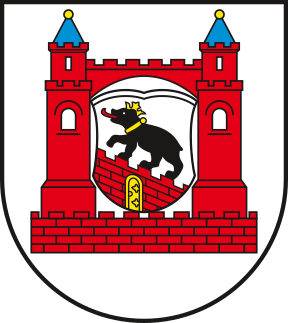
- Coat of arms

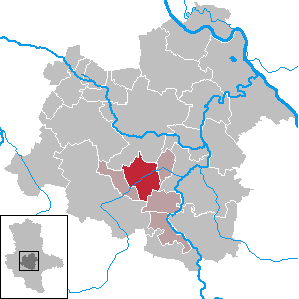
- Location of Güsten within Salzlandkreis district
- Interactive map of Güsten
- Location within Germany Location within Saxony-Anhalt
- Coordinates: 51°47′50″N 11°36′36″E
- Country: Germany
- State: Saxony-Anhalt
- District: Salzlandkreis
- Municipal assoc.: Saale-Wipper

Government
  - Mayor (2022–29): Michael Kruse

Area
  - Total: 36.16 km^{2} (13.96 sq mi)
- Elevation: 92 m (302 ft)

Population (2025-12-31)
  - Total: 3,744
  - Density: 103.5/km^{2} (268.2/sq mi)
- Time zone: UTC+01:00 (CET)
  - Summer (DST): UTC+02:00 (CEST)
- Postal codes: 39439
- Dialling codes: 039262
- Vehicle registration: SLK
- Website: www.wipperaue-guesten.de

Güsten (German pronunciation: [ˈɡʏstn̩]) is a town in the district of Salzlandkreis, in Saxony-Anhalt, Germany. It is situated on the river Wipper, west of Bernburg. It is part of the Verbandsgemeinde ("collective municipality") Saale-Wipper. It absorbed the former municipality Amesdorf in January 2010.

== Notable people ==
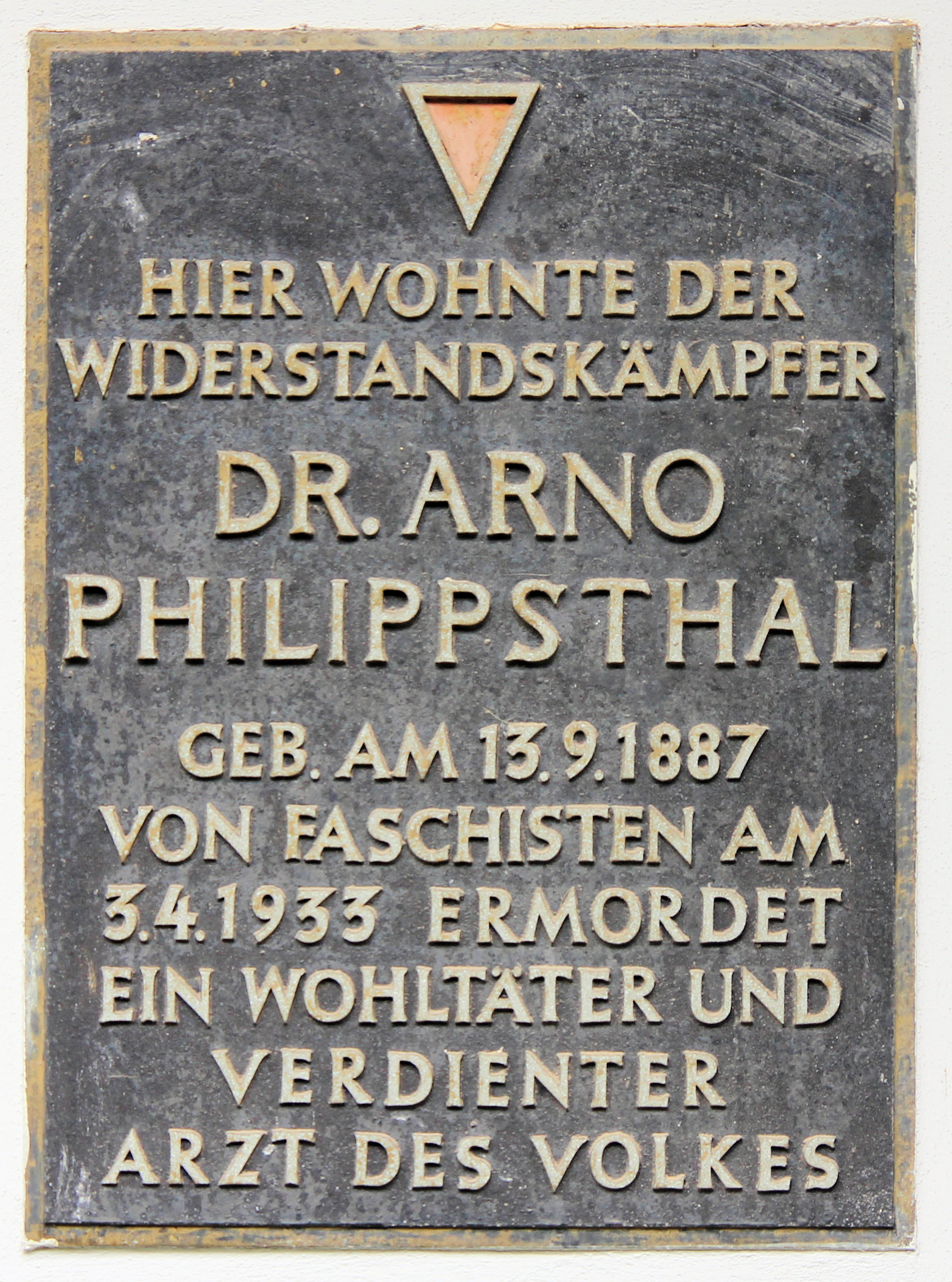
Memorial plate Berlin Arno Philippsthal

- Arno Philippsthal (1887-1933), physician and one of the first Jewish victims of the National Socialist rule in Berlin
- Ernst-Otto Reher (1936-2016), process engineer and professor, pioneer of technical rheology
- Fritz Siedentopf (1908–1944), communist and resistance fighter against Nazism.
- Julius Kraaz (1822-1889), lawyer, sugar producer and member of the German Reichstag, died in Güsten
