= David Schliesing =

German politician

Member of the Bundestag from Saxony-Anhalt
- Incumbent
- Assumed office 2025

Personal details
- Born: 26 January 1983 (age 43) Osterburg (Altmark)
- Party: Die Linke (since 2020)
- Education: University of Potsdam

David Schliesing (born 26 January 1983) is a German politician from Die Linke. He is also known as a director, actor and dramaturge.

== Early life and theatre career ==
Schliesing was born in the Altmark region and grew up in Berlin. After graduating from the Wilhelm-von-Siemens-Gymnasium in Berlin-Marzahn, he began studying German studies and philosophy at the University of Potsdam in 2003. From 2005, he studied acting directing at the Ernst Busch Academy of Dramatic Arts in Berlin and held assistant director positions and internships at the Landestheater Neustrelitz, the Theater Neubrandenburg, and in Berlin.

He completed his first directing work, as well as activities as a musician and actor, at the Berlin off-stage company at the Freies Theater "Zimmer 16 camera dell' arte". In 2007, at the Mecklenburg State Theatre in Schwerin, he directed a modern stage version of Johann Wolfgang von Goethe's Werther, which integrated music, advertising texts, and video elements into the text. The production received positive reviews from the press. His work as a dramaturge also received positive attention from cultural critics. In June 2009, he directed Georg Büchner's play Leonce and Lena as a diploma production to mark the conclusion of his studies.

From the 2010/11 season, Schliesing was a dramaturge at the Theater Mainz. For the 2013/14 season, he moved to the Theater Bonn as a dramaturge. From the 2016/17 season until 2019, Schliesing was employed as a leading drama dramaturge at the Theater Magdeburg.

Together with the director Jan-Christoph Gockel, he developed several theatre projects (Grimm: A German Fairy Tale, Heart of Darkness).

Since 2021, he has been working as an audio editor at the Landtag of Saxony-Anhalt.

== Political career ==
David Schliesing is active in the Die Linke, where he has been a member since 2020.

In the 2021 German federal election, he ran as a direct candidate for his party in Börde – Salzlandkreis constituency. Schliesing received 8.7% of the first votes. In the 2025 German federal election, he ran again as a direct candidate in same constietuency, where he received 10.6% of the first votes. Schliesing was elected to the German Bundestag, as the candidate in 2nd place on the state list of the Left Party in Saxony-Anhalt.

== Productions (selection) ==
- Geschlossene Gesellschaft nach Jean-Paul Sartre am Theater am Park, Berlin, Premiere 15. Mai 2002
- l' affaire nach Eugène Labiche im Zimmer 16 camera dell' arte, Berlin-Pankow, Premiere 2. Juli 2004
- Brechtliederabend mit Yasmin-Melissa Engelke im Zimmer 16 camera dell' arte, Berlin-Pankow, Premiere 16. April 2005
- Bär heiratet Tabak nach Anton Tschechow im Zimmer 16 camera dell' arte, Berlin-Pankow, Premiere 8. September 2005
- alter ford escort dunkelblau von Dirk Laucke, Szenische Lesung am bat-Studiotheater Berlin, Premiere 7. Juni 2006
- Symptom von Dirk Laucke am Uni.T der UdK Berlin, Premiere 14. Oktober 2006
- ciel bleu ciel von Martin Crimp beim Festival de Liège/Belgien, Premiere 16. Februar 2007
- Die Leiden des jungen Werthers nach Goethe am Staatstheater Schwerin, Premiere 27. Oktober 2007
- Alptraum. Hamlet nach Shakespeare am bat-Studiotheater Berlin, Premiere 24. Februar 2008
- Don Quijote. Ein Trailer nach Cervantes und anderen am Uni.T der UdK Berlin, Premiere 12. April 2008
- Leonce und Lena von Georg Büchner am bat-Studiotheater, Premiere 4. Juni 2009

== Dramaturgies ==
- Der Geisterseher nach Friedrich Schiller am Maxim Gorki Theater Berlin (beratende Dramaturgie), Premiere 30. Januar 2009
- Die Wissenden (UA) von Nina Ender an der Berliner Schaubühne (beratende Dramaturgie), Premiere 23. Februar 2009
- Hundeherz nach Michail Bulgakow am bat – Studiotheater Berlin, Premiere 13. März 2009
- Ein Volksfeind von Henrik Ibsen am bat-Studiotheater Berlin, Premiere 25. Februar 2010
