= Manfred Behrens =

German politician (born 1956)

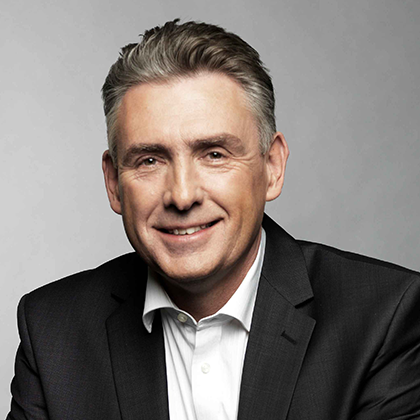

Member of the Bundestag
- In office 2009–2021

Personal details
- Born: 28 October 1956 (age 69) Magdeburg, East Germany (now Germany)
- Citizenship: German
- Party: CDU

Manfred Behrens (born 28 October 1956) is a German politician of the Christian Democratic Union (CDU) who served as a Member of the German Bundestag for Saxony-Anhalt from 2009 until 2021.

== Early life and career ==
Manfred Behrens was born in Magdeburg. He completed an apprenticeship as a car mechanic and worked in the catering industry before being elected mayor of Ebendorf (Barleben) in 1990. Since 1992, Behrens is a member of the CDU, since 2004 Chairman of the CDU local associations Barleben / Ebendorf / Meitzendorf. In 1999 he also moved to the district council for the CDU. From 2001 to 2003, he worked as an employee of the state parliament of Saxony-Anhalt.

== Political career ==
In the German federal elections on 27 September 2009, Behrens won the direct mandate in the Bundestag constituency Börde - Jerichower Land and became a member of the German Bundestag. In the 17th legislature, he was full member of the Interior Committee and deputy member of the Committee on Family, Senior Citizens, Women and Youth.

In the 2013 federal elections, Behrens again won the direct mandate for his constituency. He subsequently became a member of the Committee on Transport and Digital Infrastructure, where he served as his parliamentary group’s rapporteur on for accessibility and consumer protection, and a deputy member of the Committee on Family, Senior Citizens, Women and Youth. In the 2017 federal elections, he won his constituency again. In addition to his committee assignments, Behrens was a member of the German-Canadian Parliamentary Friendship Group and of the Parliamentary Friendship Group for the States of East Africa, which is in charge of maintaining inter-parliamentary relations with Ethiopia, Burundi, Djibouti, Eritrea, Kenya, Rwanda, Somalia, Sudan and Uganda.

Behrens decided to run again in the 2021 German federal election.
