= Borne, Saxony-Anhalt =

Borne
- Municipality
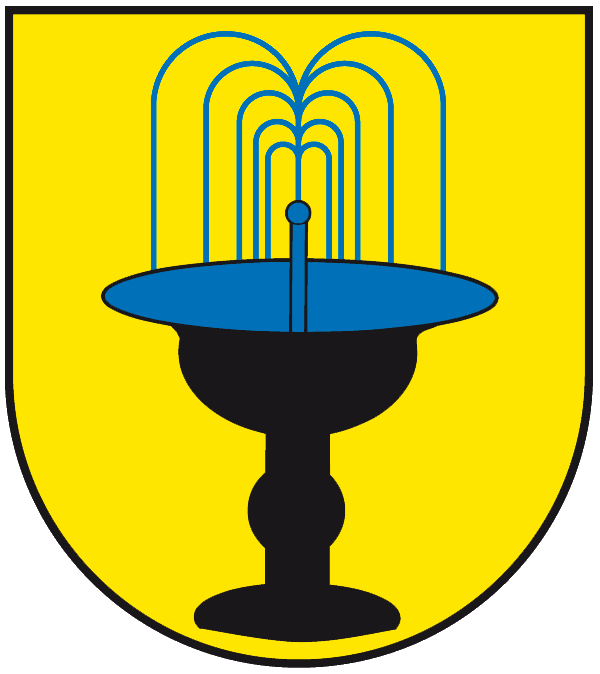
- Coat of arms

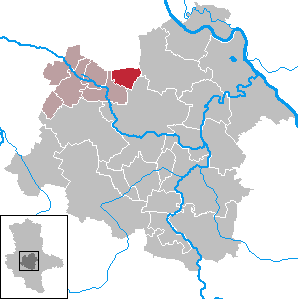
- Location of Borne within Salzlandkreis district
- Interactive map of Borne
- Location within Germany Location within Saxony-Anhalt
- Coordinates: 51°57′0″N 11°33′25″E
- Country: Germany
- State: Saxony-Anhalt
- District: Salzlandkreis
- Municipal assoc.: Egelner Mulde

Government
  - Mayor (2022–29): Sven Rosomkiewicz (CDU)

Area
  - Total: 15.32 km^{2} (5.92 sq mi)
- Elevation: 90 m (300 ft)

Population (2025-12-31)
  - Total: 1,152
  - Density: 75.20/km^{2} (194.8/sq mi)
- Time zone: UTC+01:00 (CET)
  - Summer (DST): UTC+02:00 (CEST)
- Postal codes: 39435
- Dialling codes: 039263
- Vehicle registration: SLK
- Website: www.egelnermulde.de

Borne (German pronunciation: [ˈbɔʁnə]) is a municipality in the district of Salzlandkreis, in Saxony-Anhalt, Germany. Borne was first mentioned in 946; old spellings include Brunone (959), Burnon (973), Burne (1197) and the current spelling, used since 1211. The name derives from the phrase "am Brunnen", "by the spring", in reference to a still-extant natural spring.
