= Hecklingen =

- Town
- Coat of arms

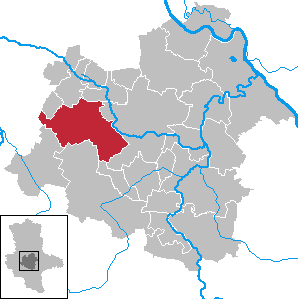
- Location of Hecklingen within Salzlandkreis district
- Interactive map of Hecklingen
- Location within Germany Location within Saxony-Anhalt
- Coordinates: 51°51′N 11°31′E
- Country: Germany
- State: Saxony-Anhalt
- District: Salzlandkreis

Government
  - Mayor (2022–29): Hendrik Mahrholdt

Area
  - Total: 95.34 km^{2} (36.81 sq mi)
- Elevation: 75 m (246 ft)

Population (2025-12-31)
  - Total: 6,368
  - Density: 66.79/km^{2} (173.0/sq mi)
- Time zone: UTC+01:00 (CET)
  - Summer (DST): UTC+02:00 (CEST)
- Postal codes: 39444
- Dialling codes: 03925
- Vehicle registration: SLK
- Website: www.stadt-hecklingen.de

Hecklingen (German pronunciation: [ˈhɛklɪŋən]) is a town in the Salzlandkreis district, in Saxony-Anhalt, Germany. It is situated on the river Bode, approx. 4 kilometres (2 miles) west of Staßfurt, and 12 km (7 mi) northeast of Aschersleben.

== International relations ==
Hecklingen is twinned with:

- Nisko in Poland
