= Egelner Mulde =

- Verbandsgemeinde
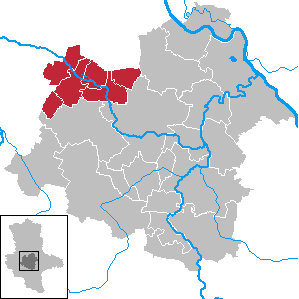
- Map of Salzlandkreis highlighting Egelner Mulde
- Interactive map of Egelner Mulde
- Location within Germany Location within Saxony-Anhalt
- Coordinates: 51°57′N 11°26′E
- Country: Germany
- State: Saxony-Anhalt
- District: Salzlandkreis
- Seat: Egeln
- Subdivisions: 5 municipalities

Area
  - Total: 125.4 km^{2} (48.4 sq mi)

Population (2025-12-31)
  - Total: 10,146
  - Density: 80.91/km^{2} (209.6/sq mi)
- Time zone: UTC+01:00 (CET)
  - Summer (DST): UTC+02:00 (CEST)
- Website: www.egelnermulde.de

Egelner Mulde is a Verbandsgemeinde ("collective municipality") in the Salzlandkreis district, in Saxony-Anhalt, Germany. Before 1 January 2010, it was a Verwaltungsgemeinschaft. The seat of the Verbandsgemeinde is in Egeln.

The Verbandsgemeinde Egelner Mulde consists of the following municipalities:

1. Bördeaue
2. Börde-Hakel
3. Borne
4. Egeln
5. Wolmirsleben
