= Saale-Wipper =

- Verbandsgemeinde
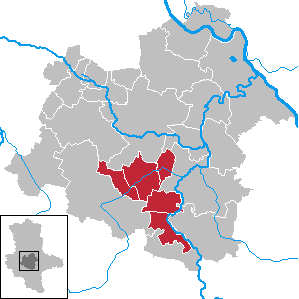
- Map of Salzlandkreis highlighting Saale-Wipper
- Interactive map of Saale-Wipper
- Location within Germany Location within Saxony-Anhalt
- Coordinates: 51°48′N 11°37′E
- Country: Germany
- State: Saxony-Anhalt
- District: Salzlandkreis
- Seat: Güsten
- Subdivisions: 5 municipalities

Area
  - Total: 118.82 km^{2} (45.88 sq mi)

Population (2025-12-31)
  - Total: 9,258
  - Density: 77.92/km^{2} (201.8/sq mi)
- Time zone: UTC+01:00 (CET)
  - Summer (DST): UTC+02:00 (CEST)
- Website: www.saale-wipper.de

Saale-Wipper is a Verbandsgemeinde ("collective municipality") in the district Salzlandkreis, in Saxony-Anhalt, Germany. Before 1 January 2010, it was a Verwaltungsgemeinschaft. It is situated southwest of Bernburg. It is named after the rivers Saale and Wipper, which flow through its territory. The seat of the Verbandsgemeinde is in Güsten.

The Verbandsgemeinde Saale-Wipper consists of the following municipalities:

1. Alsleben
2. Giersleben
3. Güsten
4. Ilberstedt
5. Plötzkau
