= Staßfurt =

Town in Saxony-Anhalt, Germany

- Town
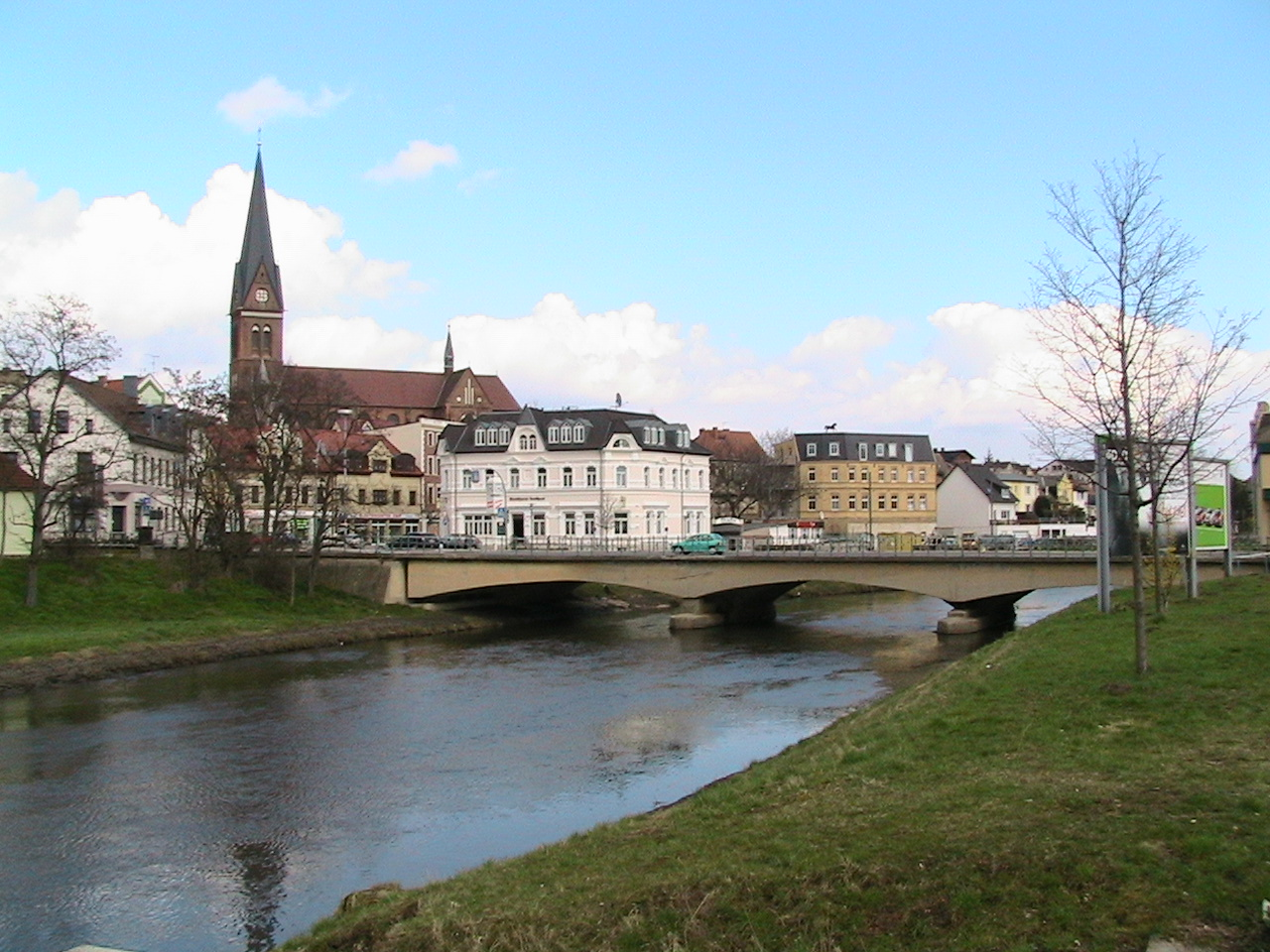
- View of the town

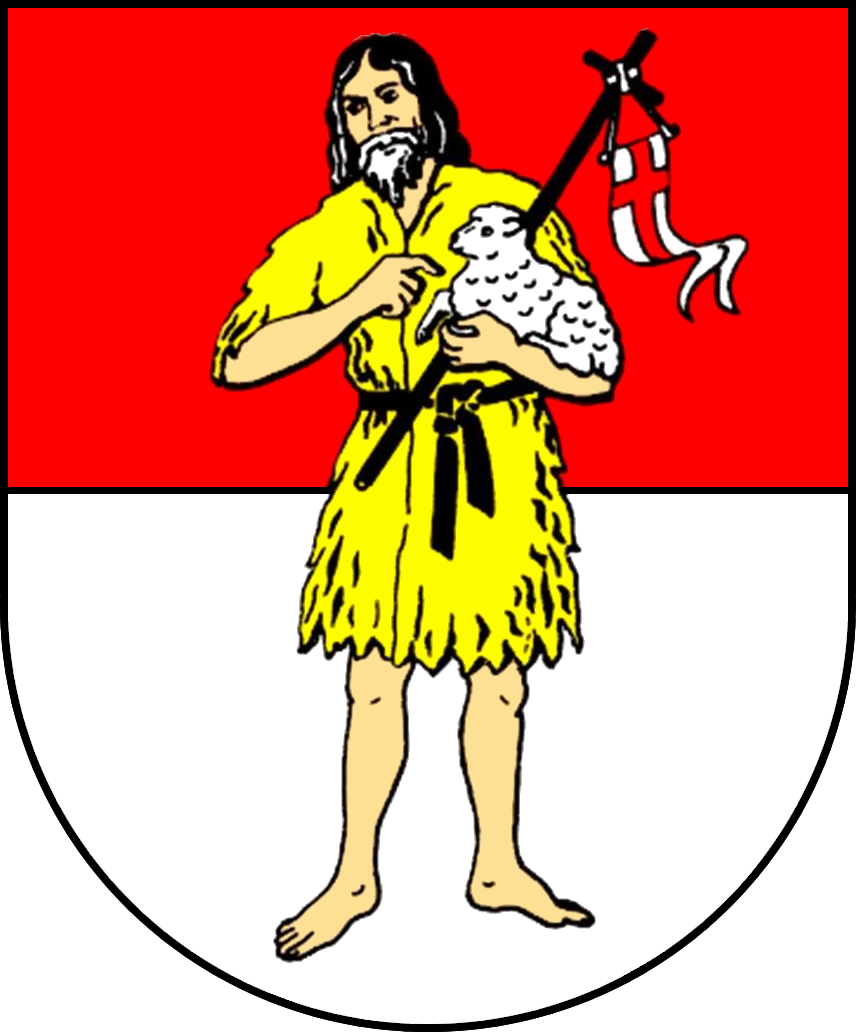
- Coat of arms

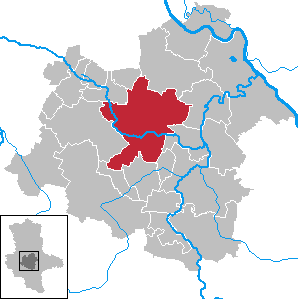
- Location of Staßfurt within Salzlandkreis district
- Interactive map of Staßfurt
- Location within Germany Location within Saxony-Anhalt
- Coordinates: 51°52′N 11°34′E
- Country: Germany
- State: Saxony-Anhalt
- District: Salzlandkreis
- Subdivisions: 5

Government
  - Mayor (2022–29): René Zok (CDU)

Area
  - Total: 146.71 km^{2} (56.65 sq mi)
- Elevation: 73 m (240 ft)

Population (2025-12-31)
  - Total: 22,900
  - Density: 156/km^{2} (404/sq mi)
- Time zone: UTC+01:00 (CET)
  - Summer (DST): UTC+02:00 (CEST)
- Postal codes: 39418
- Dialling codes: 03925
- Vehicle registration: SLK, ASL, BBG, SBK, SFT
- Website: www.stassfurt.de

Staßfurt (Stassfurt) (German pronunciation: [ˈʃtasfʊʁt]) is a town in the Salzlandkreis district, in Saxony-Anhalt, Germany. It is situated on both sides of the river Bode, approximately 15 km (9.3 mi) northeast of Aschersleben and 30 km (19 mi) south of Magdeburg. Pop. (2005) 23,538.

It was one of the chief seats of the German salt-producing industry. It is still surrounded in part by the ruins of its ancient walls, but, with the exception of the parish church of St. John (15th century), there are no buildings worthy of special notice.

== History ==
The first mention of the place was in connection with the village of Alt-Staßfurt in 806, in an invitation by Emperor Charlemagne to the Abbot Fulrad of St. Quentin to hold an army meeting at Starasfurt on the Bode River. The interpretation of the name is most likely from a composition of the Old Slavic word for old (staraja) with the Old High German word for river-crossing (furt).

The importance of Staßfurt in the Middle Ages was due to its location. Here, the old trading and salt road led from Lüneburg coming to Halle. The village Alt-Staßfurt north of the Bode was temporally and spiritually under the Archbishop of Magdeburg. In the 11th century, a castle was built south of the Bode. By 1180, the city law was extended to settlement areas south of the Bode within the defensive walls. Until 1277, Staßfurt and its castle was in the possession of the Anhalt Counts. Afterward, the brother Dukes of Saxony, John I and Albrecht II, held such a huge banquet celebrating their knighthoods that they to settle the debt of 6,000 silver marks by pledging Staßfurt to Archbishop Conrad II of Magdeburg on 8 July 1276.

In the Peace of Westphalia of 1648, Staßfurt shared the fate of Magdeburg and was awarded to Brandenburg, but only on the death of the Duke of Saxe-Weissenfels, who had been promised the territory in the Peace of Prague in 1635. As of 1680, Staßfurt was a so-called Immediate City directly subordinated to the Duchy of Magdeburg and lay until 1807 in the Holzkreis region. After this, it was temporarily within a canton of the Kingdom of Westphalia. From 1815, Staßfurt was incorporated into the administrative district of Magdeburg in the Province of Saxony, and it remained so until the dissolution of the Prussian state in 1947.

During the Second World War, a small satellite camp of Buchenwald called Staßfurt I / Neustaßfurt (alias deer) was built on September 13, 1944, situated between the villages of Löderburg-Lust and Atzendorf, in which 459 prisoners, mostly from France, at the underground relocation of Ernst Heinkel AG had to work together with Polish concentration camp prisoners in extremely poor conditions. Of those, between 300 and 380 lost their lives. Another external camp existed from December 28, 1944, in the village of Leopoldshall. Both camps were evacuated on April 11, 1945, with a death march. The atomic bomb Little Boy, detonated over Hiroshima on August 6, 1945, contained 64 kilograms of uranium. At least part of the uranium allegedly came from the approximately 1,100 tons of uranium ore and uranium oxide that had been secured by U.S. forces in Staßfurt in the second half of April 1945.

From 1952 to 1994, Staßfurt was county seat of the district of Staßfurt and later government district Magdeburg. With the regional reform in 1994, the new county of Aschersleben-Staßfurt was formed by the merger of the districts Aschersleben and Staßfurt. In the course of the district reform in 2007, Staßfurt was transferred to the newly formed Salzlandkreis.

The militant group SWAPO sent children from war-torn areas of South West Africa to Staßfurt for education and training in the German Democratic Republic during the independence struggle in the 1980s. Thus, at the beginning of 1990, 291 such children were at the school of friendship in Staßfurt. In August 1990, they were returned to the now-independent Namibia.

== Local divisions ==
Staßfurt is divided into the following localities (with postal codes):

- Altstaßfurt (39418)
- Atzendorf (39443)
- Athensleben (39446)
- Brumby (39443)
- Förderstedt (39443)
- Glöthe (39443)
- Hohenerxleben (39443)
- Leopoldshall (39418)
- Löbnitz (39443)
- Löderburg (39446)
- Lust (39446)
- Neu Staßfurt (39418)
- Neundorf (39418)
- Rathmannsdorf (39418)
- Rothenförde (39446)
- Staßfurt (Altstadt) (39418)
- Staßfurt-Nord (39418)
- Üllnitz (39443)

Staßfurt has the following Ortschaften or municipal divisions: Athensleben, Förderstedt, Hohenerxleben, Löderburg, Neundorf and Rathmannsdorf.

=== The lost hamlets of Atzendorf ===
Around the village of Atzendorf are several lost hamlets, reputedly destroyed together with Atzendorf and many other villages of Staßfurt on 29 August 1635 by Imperialist troops. Although the ruined hamlets of Eikendorfer Kock, Eimecke, Kötlingen, Luxdorf, and Stieritz appeared on older maps, today there is only tilled farmland. The old road to the nearby town of Borne bei Staßfurt was demolished, but traces of its route are still visible in the lay of the land.

== Salt production ==
Although saline springs are mentioned here as early as the 13th century, the first attempt to bore for salt was not made until 1839, while the systematic exploitation of the salt-beds, to which the town is indebted for its prosperity, dates only from 1856. The shafts reached deposits of salt at a depth of 850 ft (190 m), but the finer and purer layers lie more than 100 ft (31 m) below the surface. The rock-salt is excavated by blasting. Besides the rock-salt, the deposits of Staßfurt yield a considerable quantity of deliquescent salts and other saline products, which have encouraged the foundation of numerous chemical factories in the town and in the neighboring village of Leopoldshall (currently part of Staßfurt). The rock-salt works are mainly government property, while the chemical factories are in private hands. The town is also home to Staßfurt Museum shed, which houses many preserved steam locomotives.

== Staßfurt potash deposit ==
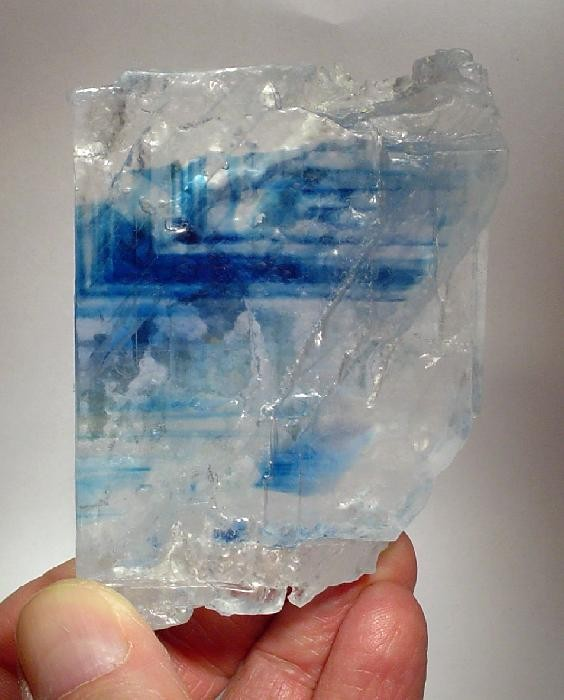
Halite crystal from the Staßfurt potash deposit. The beautiful azure-blue color banding is sought after by mineral collectors.

The Staßfurt potash deposit, a part of the same evaporite sequence that hosts the salt mines, is notable historically as the site of the earliest large-scale mining of potash for fertilizer, beginning in 1861.

== Environmental issues ==
The discharge of wastewater by local companies into the Bode has been frequently criticized as severely damaging the ecosystem of the river by environmentalist organisations. The decrease in water quality of the Bode may be the cause of high fish mortality. To prevent damage to the river’s wildlife, the state of Saxony-Anhalt has announced an increase in the supervision of the Bode. The city council's measures to reduce chemical emissions in wastewaters have been criticized as insufficient by BUND (Friends of the Earth Germany), the IG Bode-Lachs e.V. and the Green Party.

== Notable people ==
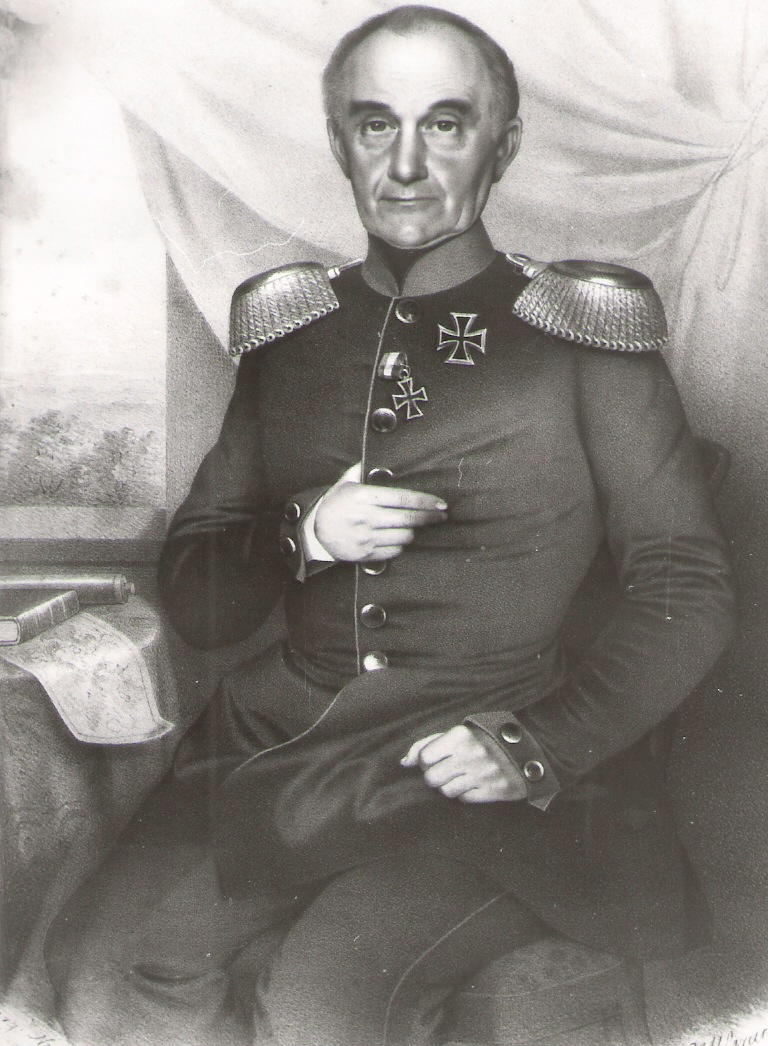
Wilhelm von Willisen in 1847

- Heike Brehmer (born 1962), politician
- Waltraud Dietsch (born 1950), athlete
- Hermann Volrath Hilprecht (born 1859), archaeologist and assyriologist
- Eberhard Köllner (born 1939), Backup for Sigmund Jähn, research cosmonaut of the GDR
- Günther Noll (born 1927), music educator
- Wilhelm Steinkopf (1879–1949), German chemist
- Lutz Graf Schwerin von Krosigk (1887–1977), Minister of Finance of Germany from 1932 to 1945 and Leading Minister of the German Reich (Chancellor) in May 1945
- Karl Wilhelm von Willisen (1790–1879), Prussian general
- Andreas Wecker (born 1970), German gymnast
