= Salzlandkreis =

Coordinates: 51°50′N 11°35′E

Salzland
- District
- Flag Coat of arms
- Country: Germany
- State: Saxony-Anhalt
- Capital: Bernburg

Government
  - District admin.: Markus Bauer (SPD)

Area
  - Total: 1,428.1 km^{2} (551.4 sq mi)

Population (31 December 2025)
  - Total: 178,773
  - Density: 125.18/km^{2} (324.22/sq mi)
- Time zone: UTC+01:00 (CET)
  - Summer (DST): UTC+02:00 (CEST)
- Vehicle registration: SLK, ASL, BBG, SBK, SFT
- Website: www.kreis-slk.de

Salzland is a district in the middle of Saxony-Anhalt, Germany. Its area is 1,428.1 km^{2} (551.4 sq mi). It is bounded by (from the west and clockwise) the districts Harz, Börde, Magdeburg, Jerichower Land, Anhalt-Bitterfeld, Mansfeld-Südharz and Saalekreis.

== History ==
The district was established by merging the former districts of Bernburg, Schönebeck and Aschersleben-Staßfurt (except the town Falkenstein) as part of the reform of 2007.

== Towns and municipalities ==
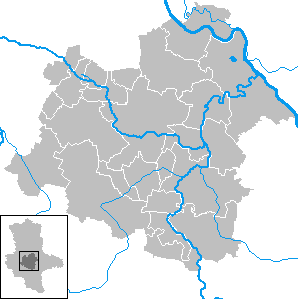
Clickable map of towns and municipalities in the district

The district Salzlandkreis consists of the following subdivisions:

Free towns
1. Aschersleben
2. Barby
3. Bernburg
4. Calbe
5. Hecklingen
6. Könnern
7. Nienburg
8. Schönebeck
9. Seeland
10. Staßfurt
Free municipalities
1. Bördeland

Verbandsgemeinden
1. Egelner Mulde; 1. Bördeaue; 2. Börde-Hakel; 3. Borne; 4. Egeln^{1, 2}; 5. Wolmirsleben	2. Saale-Wipper; 1. Alsleben^{2}; 2. Giersleben; 3. Güsten^{1, 2}; 4. Ilberstedt; 5. Plötzkau
^{1}seat of the Verbandsgemeinde; ^{2}town
