= Japanese sword mountings =

Housings and associated fittings that hold the blade of a Japanese sword

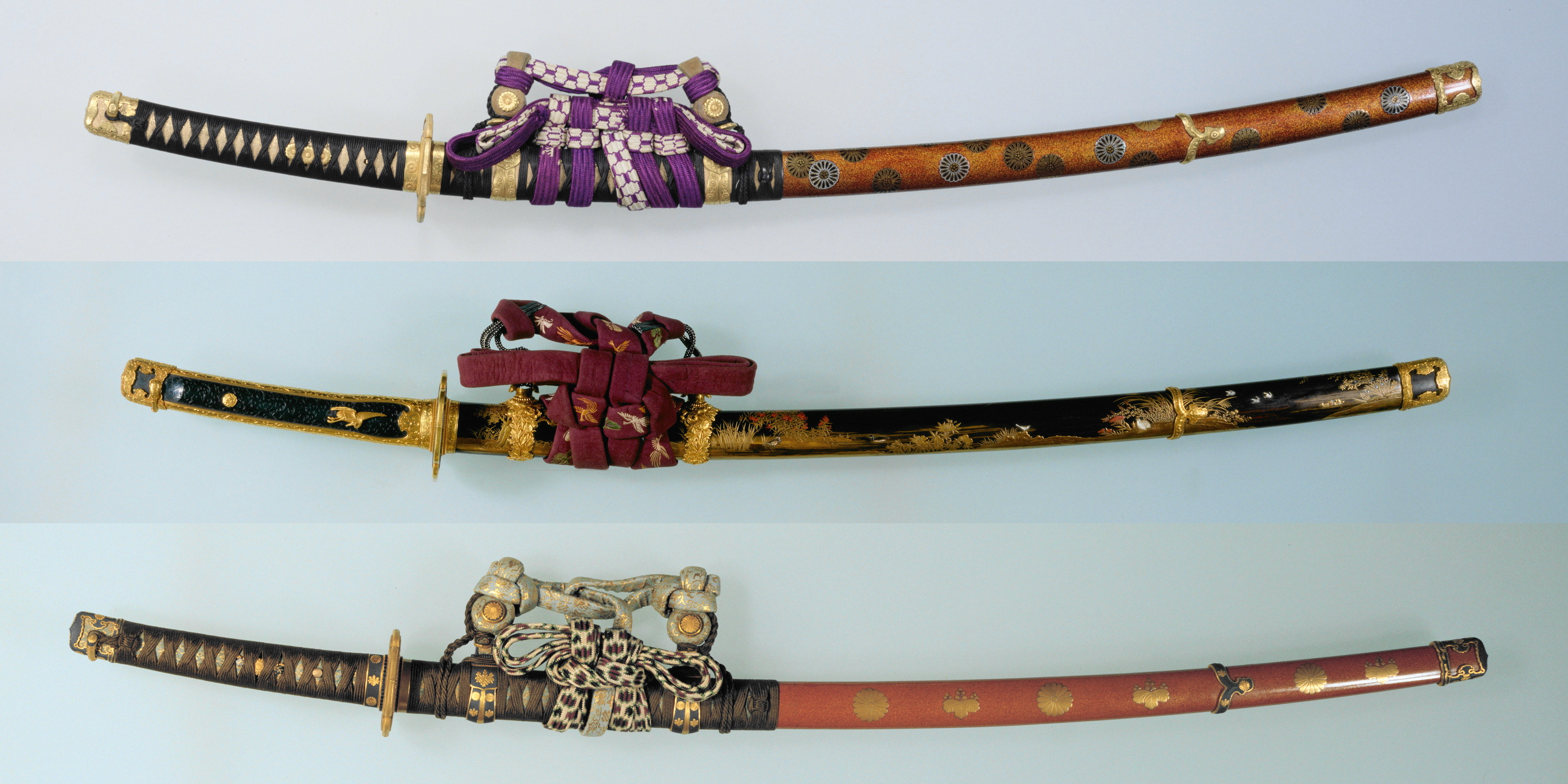
Tachi mountings decorated with maki-e and metal carving. Itomaki-no-tachi style sword mountings. (top and bottom) Edo period, 1800s. Tokyo National Museum

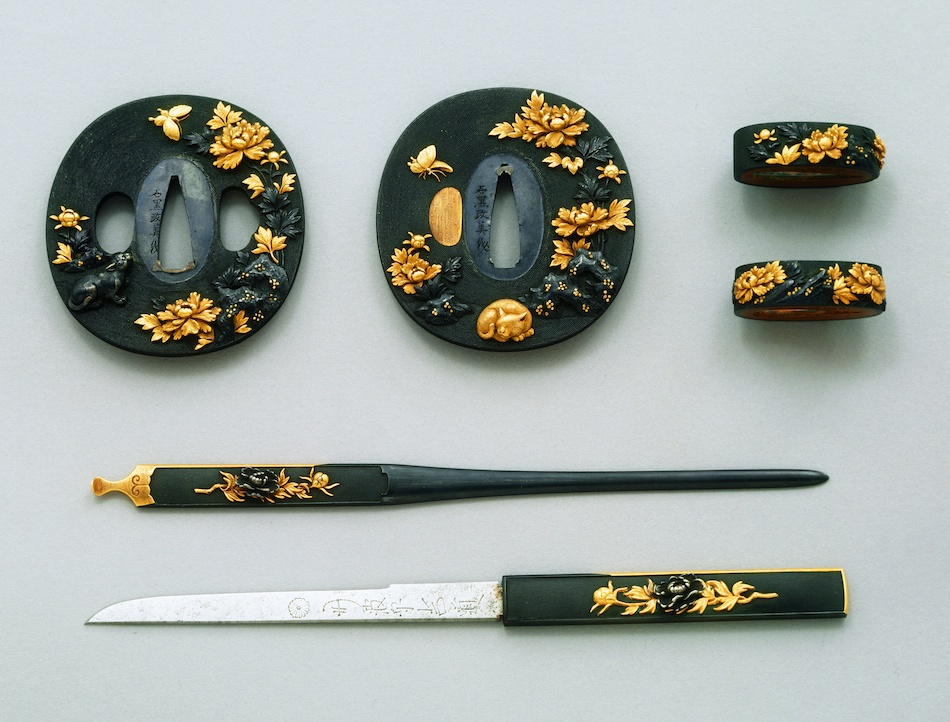
Sword fittings. Tsuba (top left) and fuchigashira (top right) made by Ishiguro Masayoshi in the 18th or 19th century. Kogai (middle) and kozuka (bottom) made by Yanagawa Naomasa in the 18th century, Edo period. Tokyo Fuji Art Museum.

Japanese sword mountings are the various housings and associated fittings (tosogu) that hold the blade of a Japanese sword when it is being worn or stored. Koshirae (拵え) refers to the ornate mountings of a Japanese sword (e.g. katana) used when the sword blade is being worn by its owner, whereas the shirasaya is a plain undecorated wooden mounting composed of a saya and tsuka that the sword blade is stored in when not being used.

== Components ==
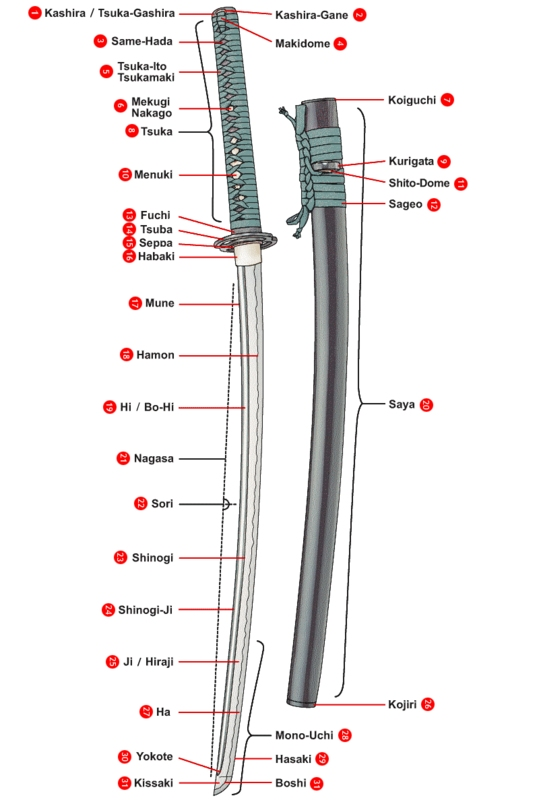
A diagram of a katana and koshirae with components identified

- Fuchi (縁): The fuchi is a hilt collar between the tsuka and the tsuba.
- Habaki (鎺): The habaki is a wedge-shaped metal collar used to keep the sword from falling out of the saya and to support the fittings below; fitted at the ha-machi and mune-machi which precede the nakago.
- Kaeshizuno (返し角): A hook-shaped fitting used to lock the saya to the obi while drawing.
- Kashira (頭): The kashira is a butt cap (or pommel) on the end of the tsuka.
- Kōgai (笄): The kōgai is a spike for hair arranging carried sometimes as part of katana-koshirae in another pocket.
- Koiguchi (鯉口): The koiguchi is the mouth of the saya or its fitting; traditionally made of buffalo horn.
- Kojiri (鐺): The kojiri is the end of the saya or the protective fitting at the end of the saya; also traditionally made of buffalo horn.
- Kozuka (小柄): The kozuka is a decorative handle fitting for the kogatana; a small utility knife fit into a pocket on the saya.
- Kurigata (栗形): The kuri-kata is a knob on the side of the saya for attaching the sageo.
- Mekugi (目釘): The mekugi is a small peg for securing the tsuka to the nakago.
- Mekugi-ana (目釘穴): The mekugi-ana are the holes in the tsuka and nakago for the mekugi.
- Menuki (目貫): The menuki are ornaments on the tsuka (generally under the tsuka-ito); Originally menuki were a cover for the mekugi to hold the peg/s in place. On tachi, worn edge down orientation at palm to orient the sword. On katana, orientation is at fingertips to orient the sword.
- Sageo (下げ緒): The sageo is the cord used to tie saya to the belt/obi when worn.
- Same-hada (鮫肌): Literally, the pattern of the ray skin.
- Same-kawa (samegawa) (鮫皮): same-kawa is the ray or shark skin wrapping of the tsuka (handle/hilt).
- Saya (鞘): The saya is a wooden scabbard for the blade; traditionally of lacquered wood.
- Seppa (切羽): The seppa are washers above and below the tsuba to tighten the fittings.
- Shitodome (鵐目): An accent on the kurikata for aesthetic purposes; often in gold-coloured metal on modern reproductions.
- Tsuba (鍔 or 鐔): The tsuba is a hand guard.
- Tsuka (柄): The tsuka is the hilt or handle; made of wood and wrapped in samegawa.
- Tsuka-maki (柄巻): The wrapping on the tsuka, including the most common hineri-maki and katate-maki (battle wrap). There are also more elaborate and artistic wrapping techniques, such as Jabara maki.
- Tsuka-ito (柄糸): Tsuka-ito is the wrapping cord of the tsuka, traditionally silk but today typically cotton and sometimes leather.
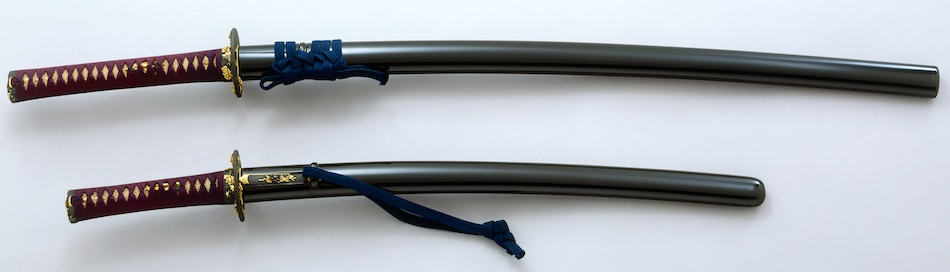
Two antique koshirae, katana (top), wakizashi (bottom), in the form of a daishō (matched set). Edo period, 19th century. Tokyo Fuji Art Museum.

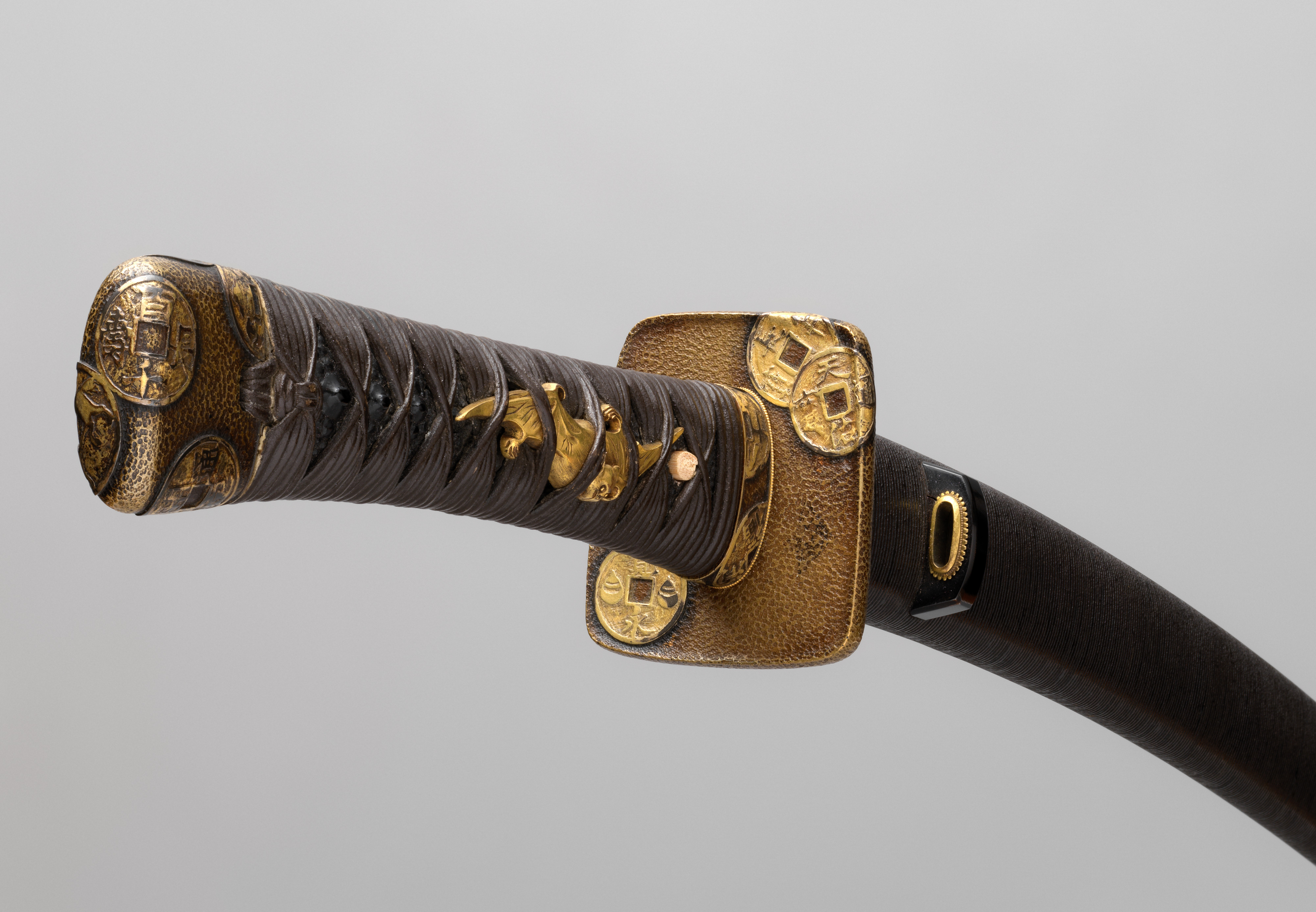
Wakizashi mounting decorated with images of old coins. 1800s. The Metropolitan Museum of Art

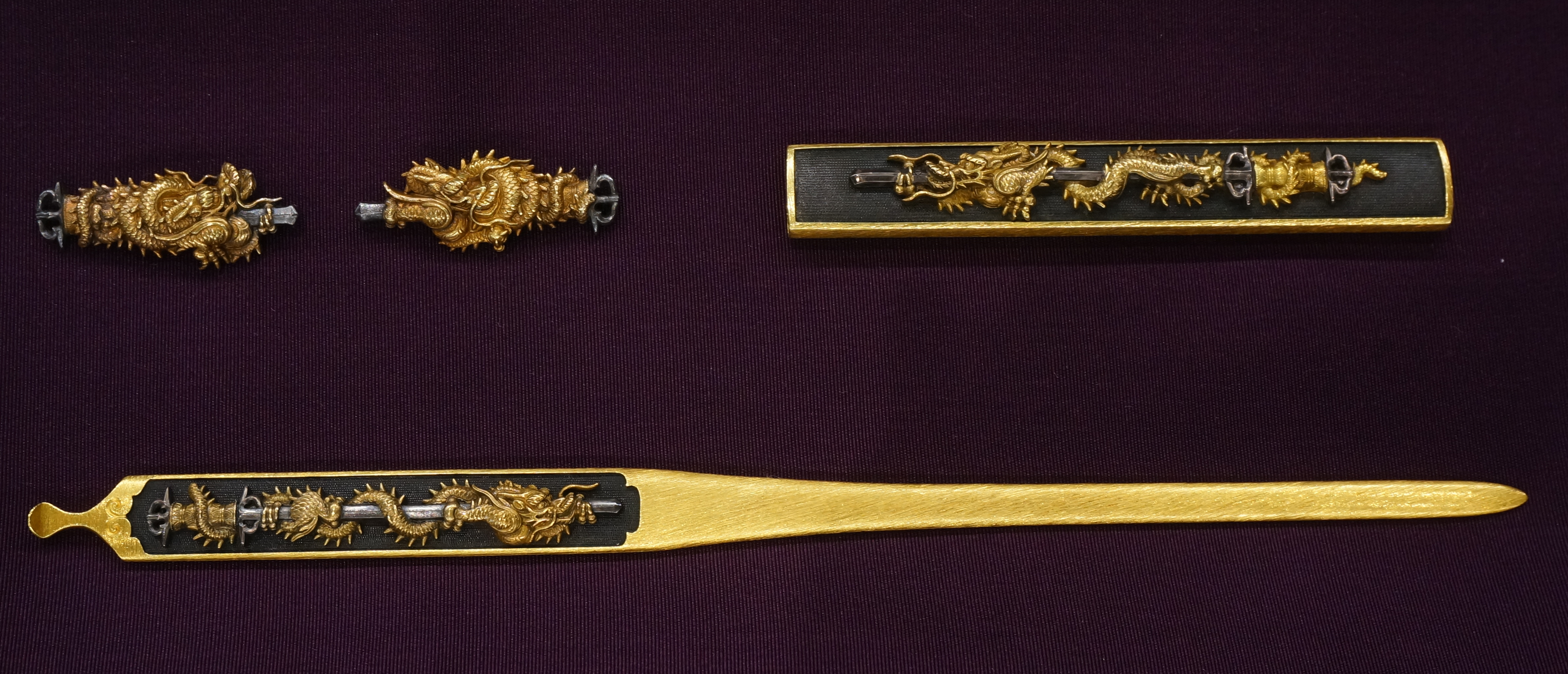
Kōgai (bottom), kozuka (top right), and menuki (top left) made by Gotō Kenjō. Early Edo period. Designated as Special Important Fitting by NBTHK.

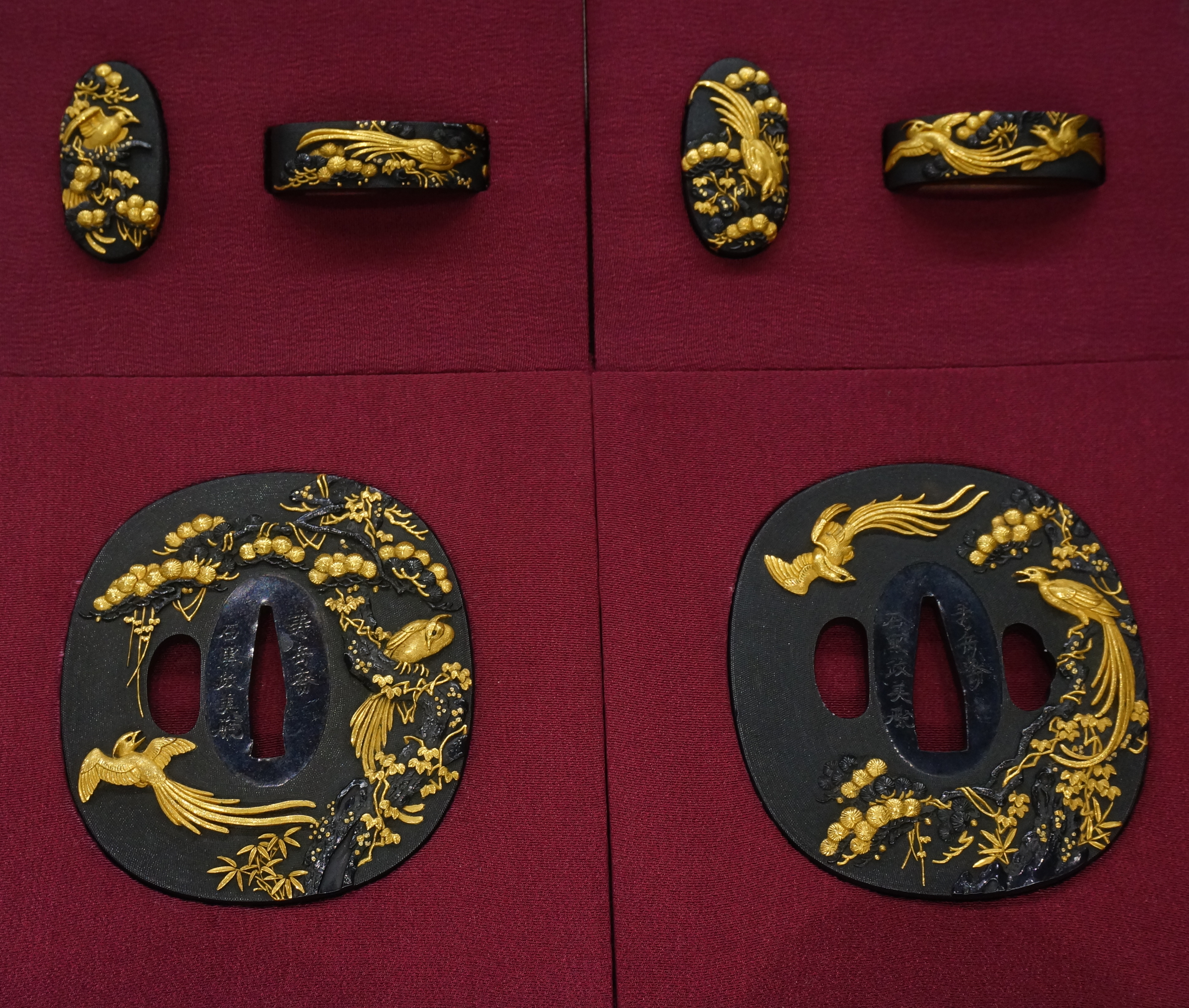
Fuchigashira (top) and tsuba (bottom) made by Ishiguro Masayoshi. Late Edo period. Designated as Special Important Fitting by NBTHK.

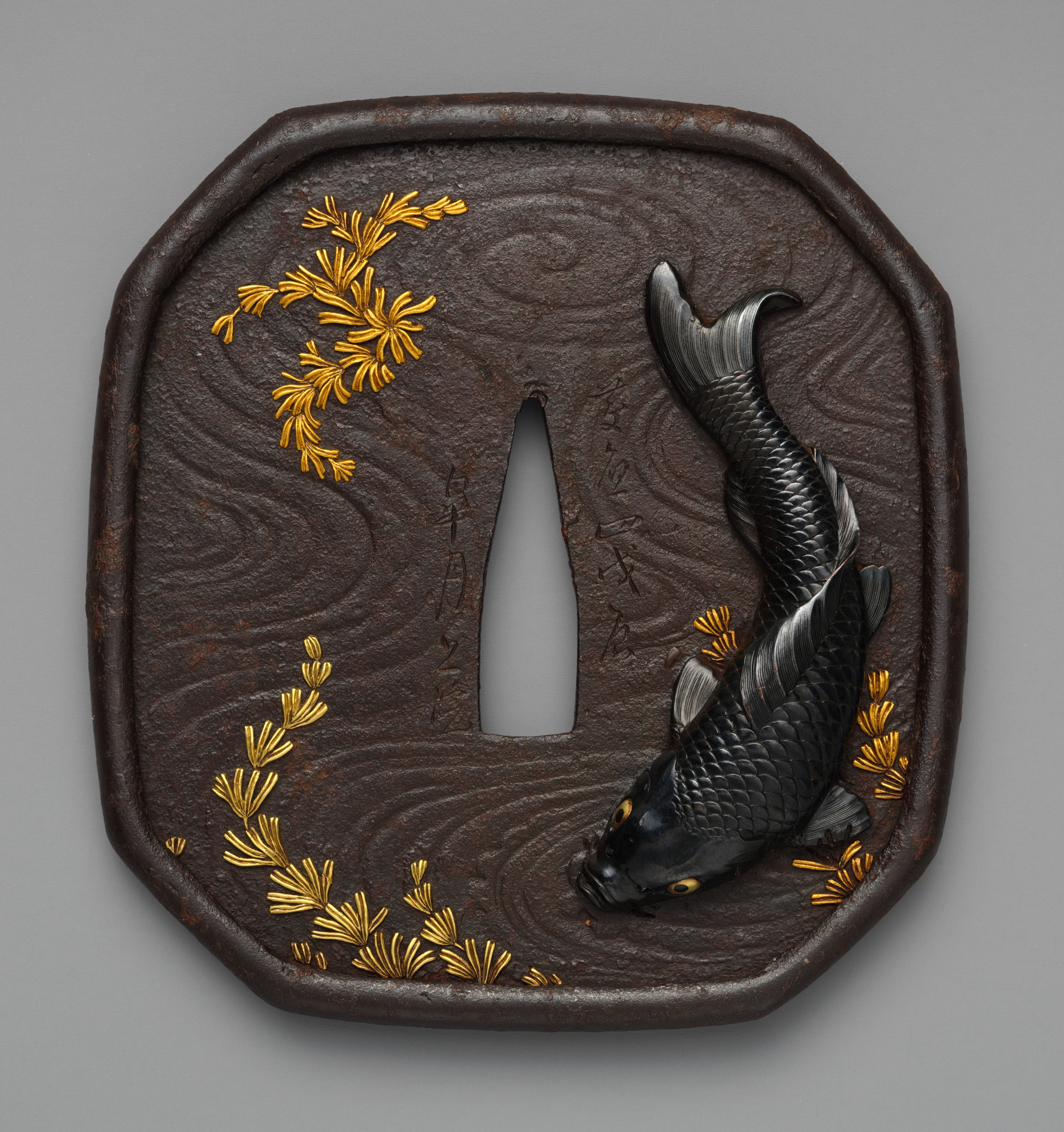
Tsuba with the Koi and Seaweed Motif, made by Kansai. Edo period. The Metropolitan Museum of Art.

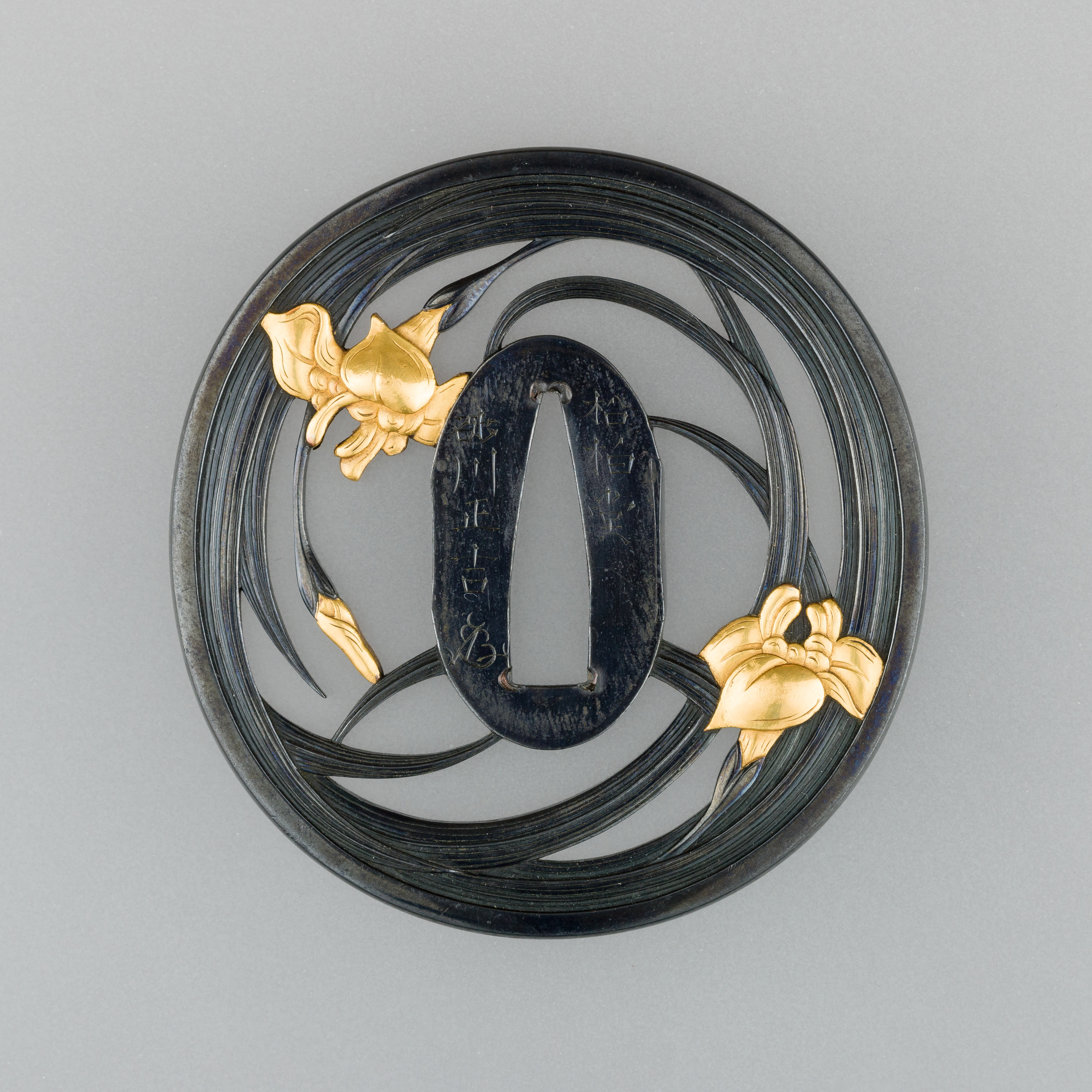
A tsuba created by Sunagawa Masayoshi. 1800s. The Metropolitan Museum of Art.

== Shirasaya ==
A shirasaya (白鞘), "white scabbard", is a plain wooden Japanese sword saya (scabbard) and tsuka (hilt), traditionally made of honoki (bigleaf magnolia) wood and used when a blade was not expected to see use for some time and needed to be stored. They were externally featureless save for the needed mekugi-ana to secure the nakago (tang), though sometimes sayagaki (blade information) was also present. The need for specialized storage is because prolonged koshirae mounting harmed the blade, owing to factors such as the lacquered wood retaining moisture and encouraging corrosion.

Such mountings are not intended for actual combat, as the lack of a tsuba (guard) and proper handle wrappings were deleterious; as such they would likely never make their way onto a battlefield. However, there have been loosely similar "hidden" mountings, such as the shikomizue. Also, many blades dating back to earlier Japanese history are today sold in such a format, along with modern-day reproductions; while most are purely decorative replicas, a few have functional blades.

=== Shirasaya gallery ===
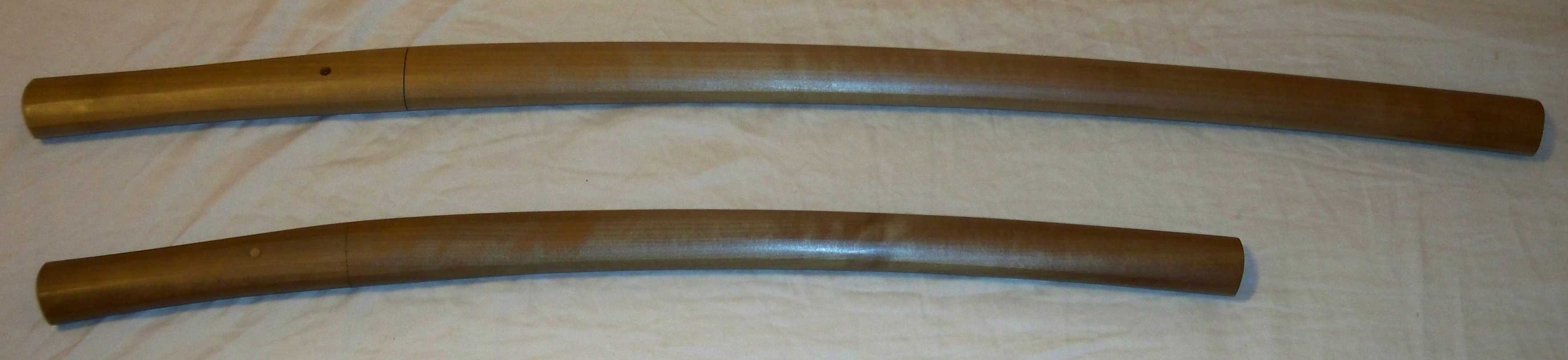
A daisho set of Japanese sword storage mounts (shirasaya) for katana (top) and wakizashi (bottom)

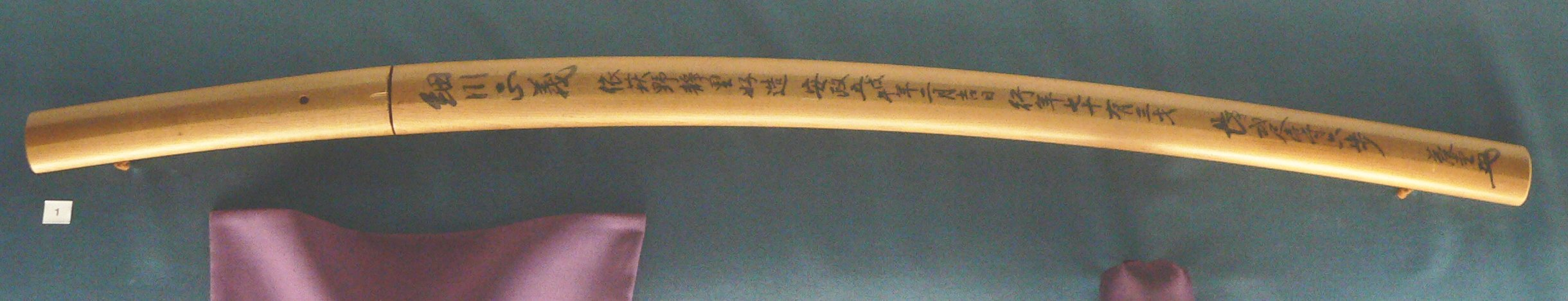
A typical shirasaya with sayagaki (attribution or appraisal written on a shirasaya)

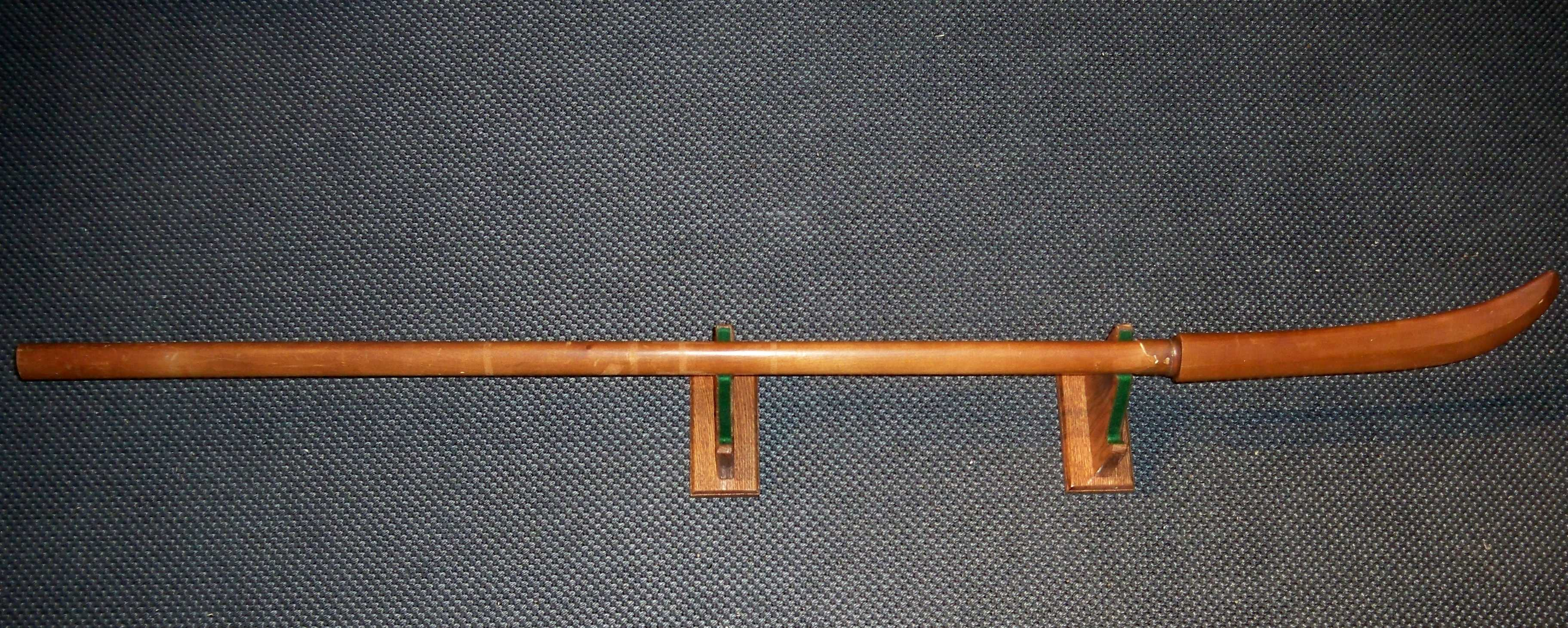
Naginata shirasaya

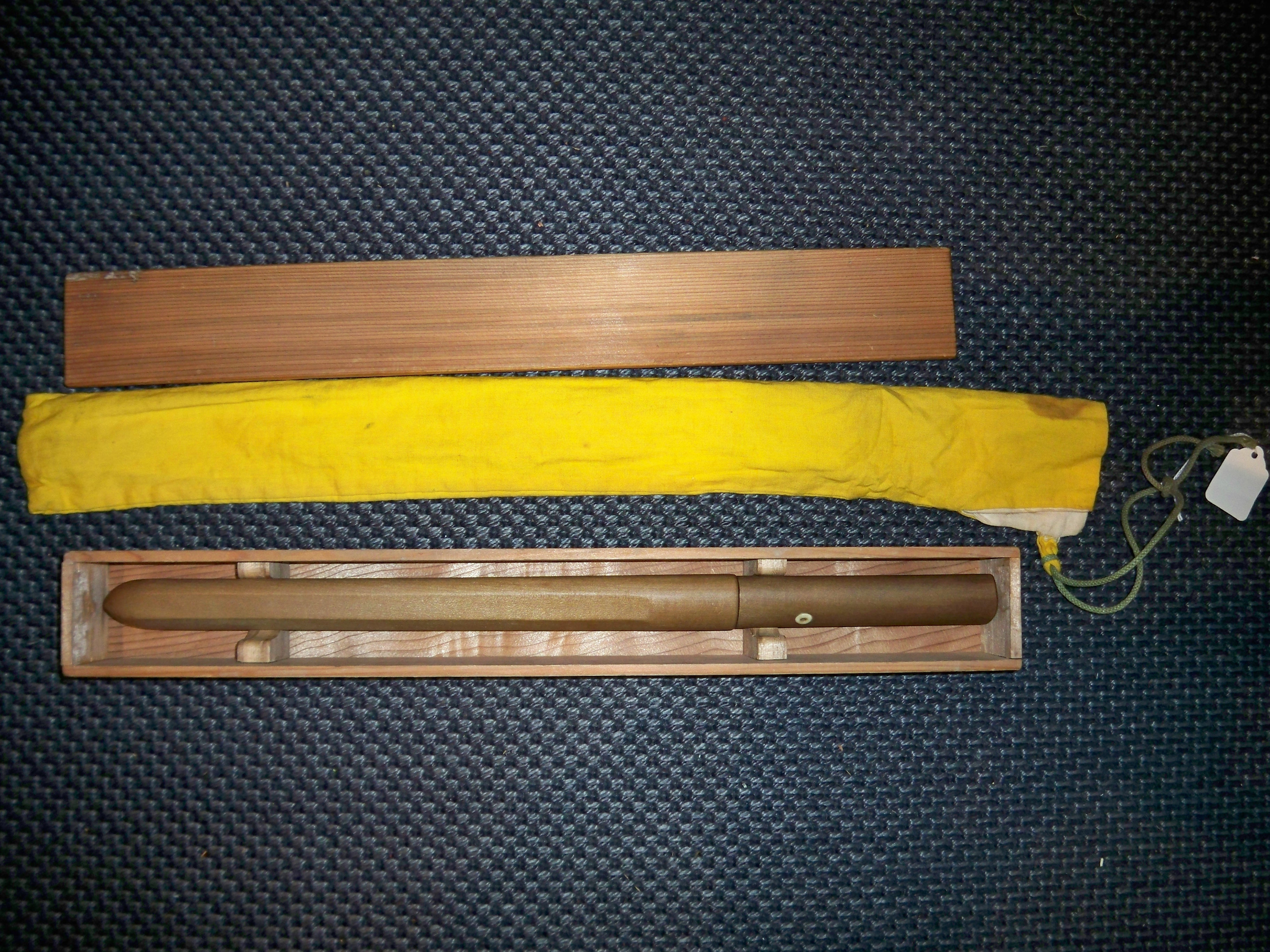
Tanto shirasaya

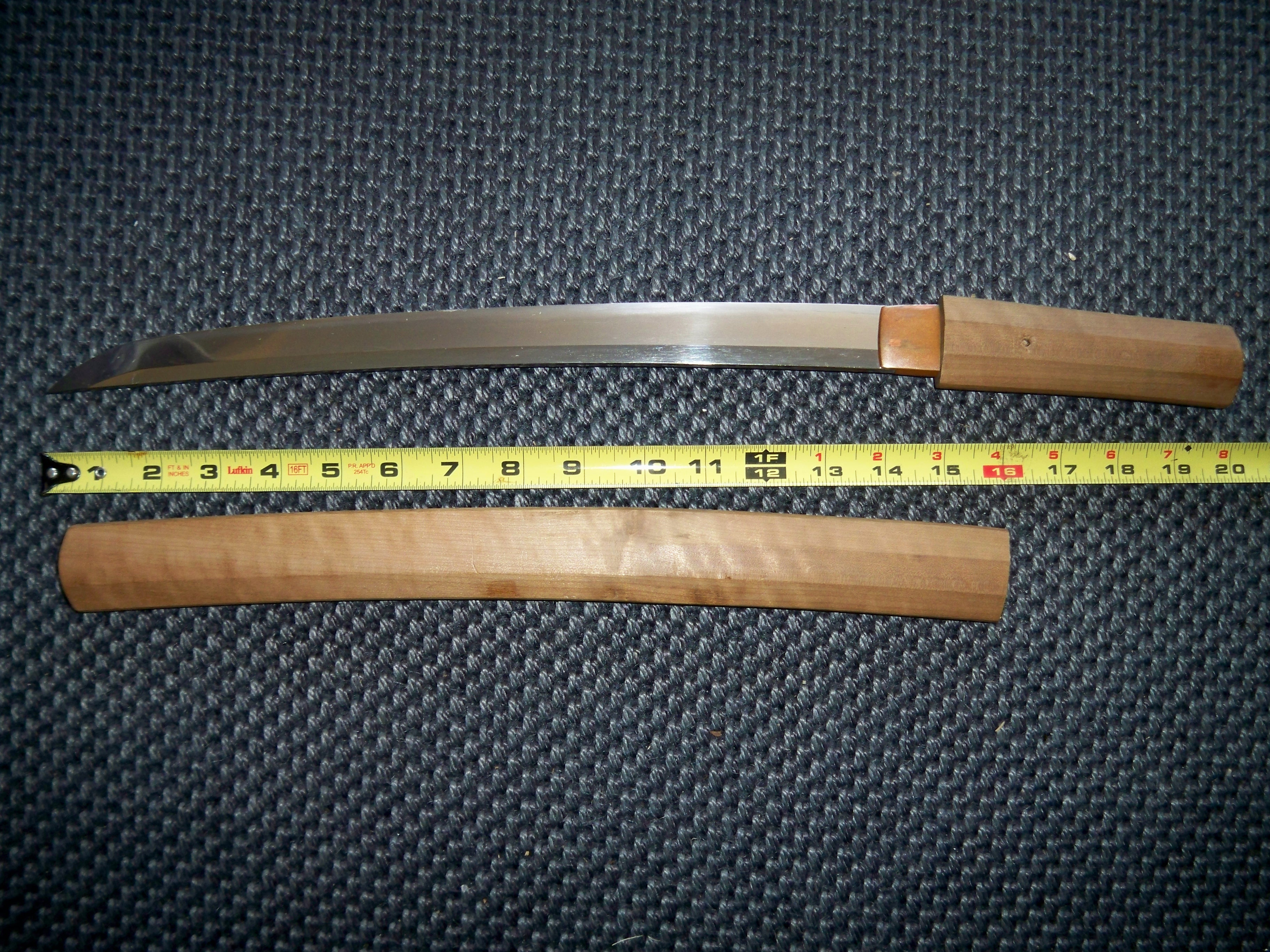
Wakizashi mounted in shirasaya

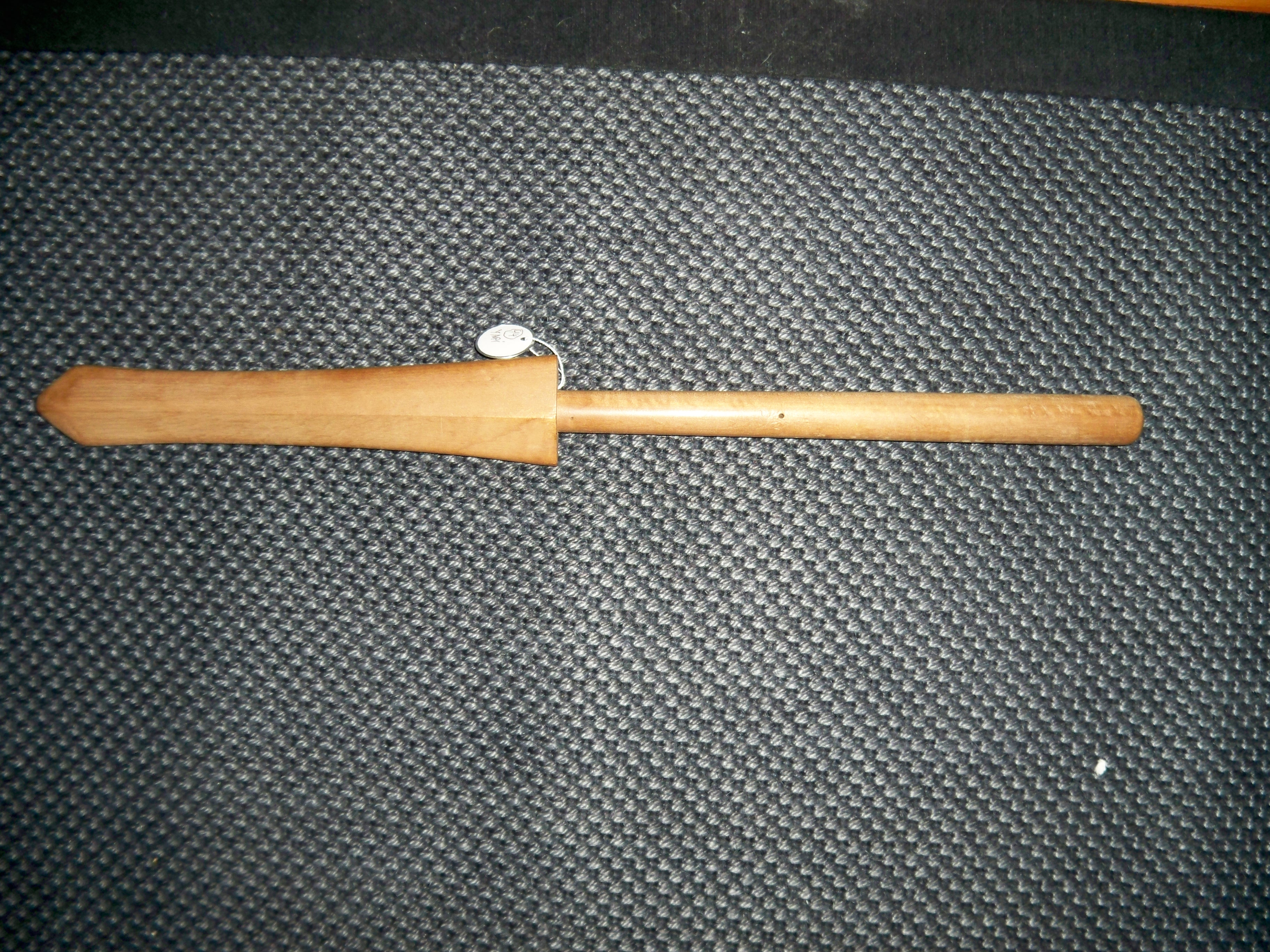
Yari shirasaya

== Koshirae ==
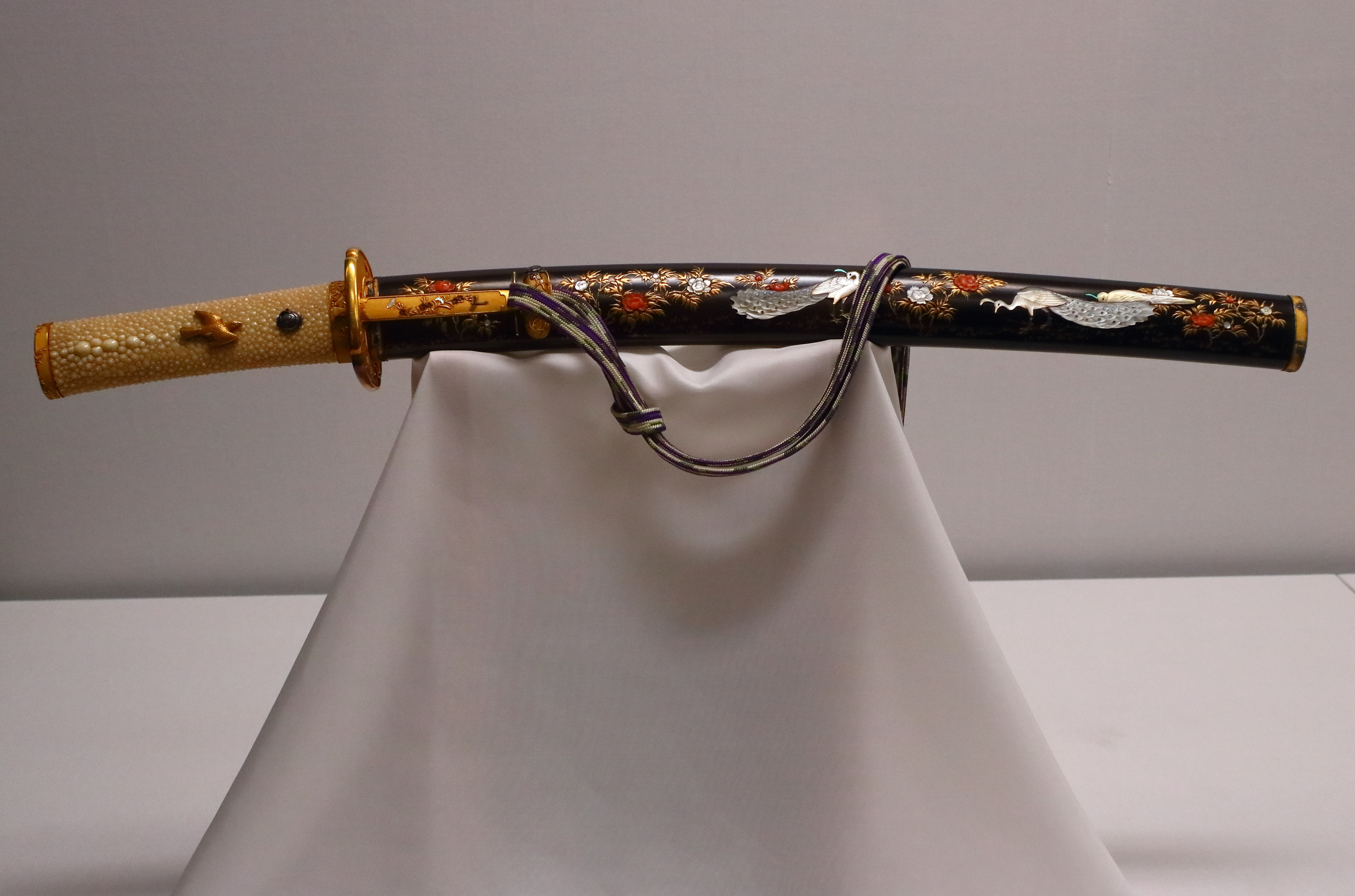
Wakizashi koshirae (Wakizashi mounting). The metal parts are made by Goto Ichijo. Edo period. Tokyo National Museum.

The word koshirae is derived from the verb koshiraeru (拵える), which is no longer used in current speech. More commonly "tsukuru" is used in its place with both words meaning to "make, create, manufacture." A more accurate word is tōsō (刀装), meaning sword-furniture, where tōsōgu (刀装具) are the parts of the mounting in general, and "kanagu" stands for those made of metal. Gaisō (外装) are the "outer" mountings, as opposed to tōshin (刀身), the "body" of the sword.

A koshirae should be presented with the tsuka (hilt) to the left, particularly in times of peace with the reason being that one cannot unsheathe the sword easily this way. During the Edo period, many formalized rules were put into place: in times of war the hilt should be presented to the right allowing the sword to be readily unsheathed.

Koshirae were meant not only for functional but also for aesthetic purposes, often using a family mon (crest) for identification.

=== Types of koshirae ===
==== Tachi ====
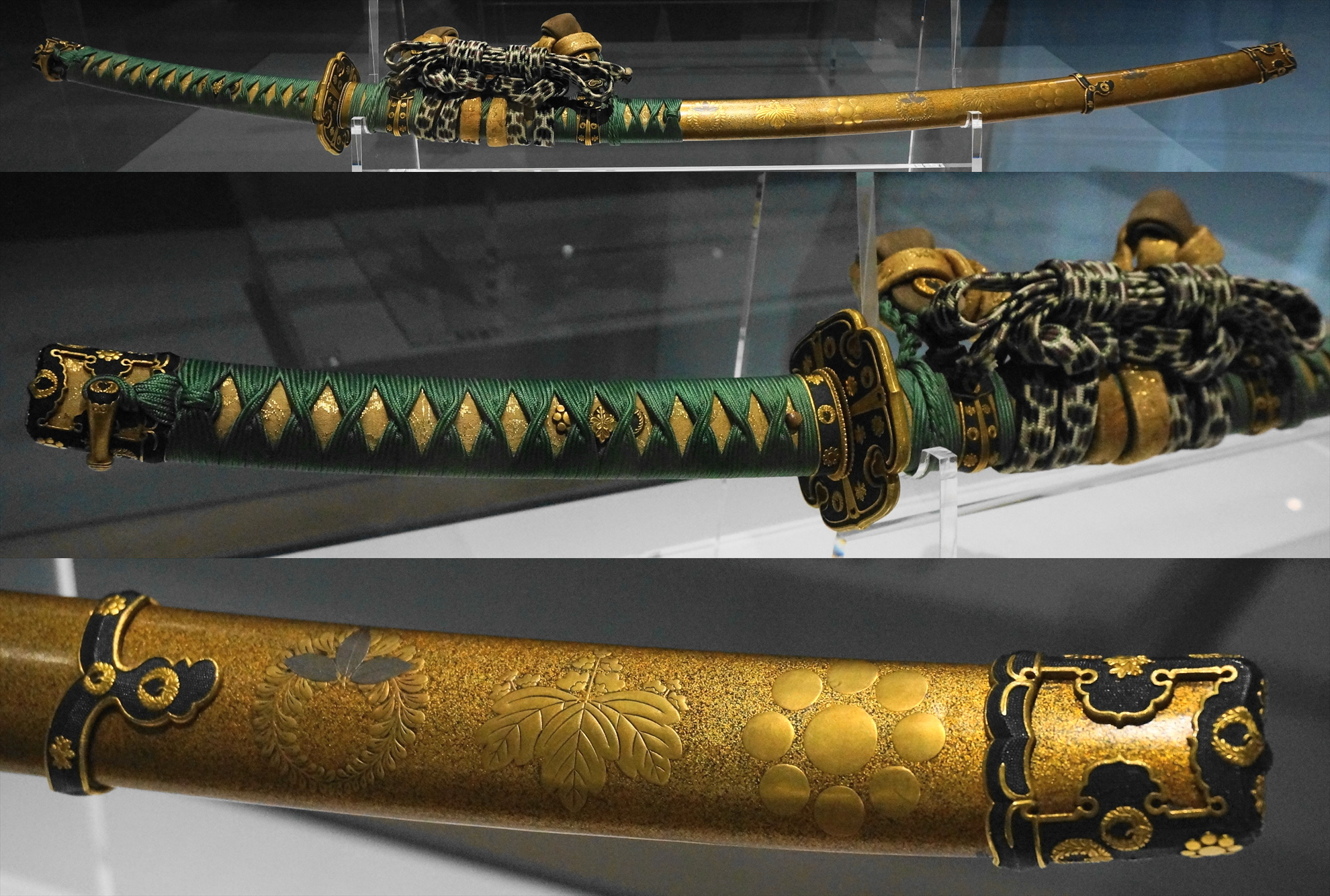
Mounting for a sword of the itomaki no tachi type with design of mon (family crests). 1600s. Museum of Fine Arts, Boston.

The tachi (太刀) style koshirae is the primary style of mounting used for the tachi, where the sword is suspended edge-down from two hangers (ashi) attached to the obi. The hilt often had a slightly stronger curvature than the blade, continuing the classic tachi increase in curvature going from the tip to the hilt. The hilt was usually secured with two pegs (mekugi), as compared to one peg for shorter blades including katana. The tachi style koshirae preceded the katana style koshirae.

==== Katana ====
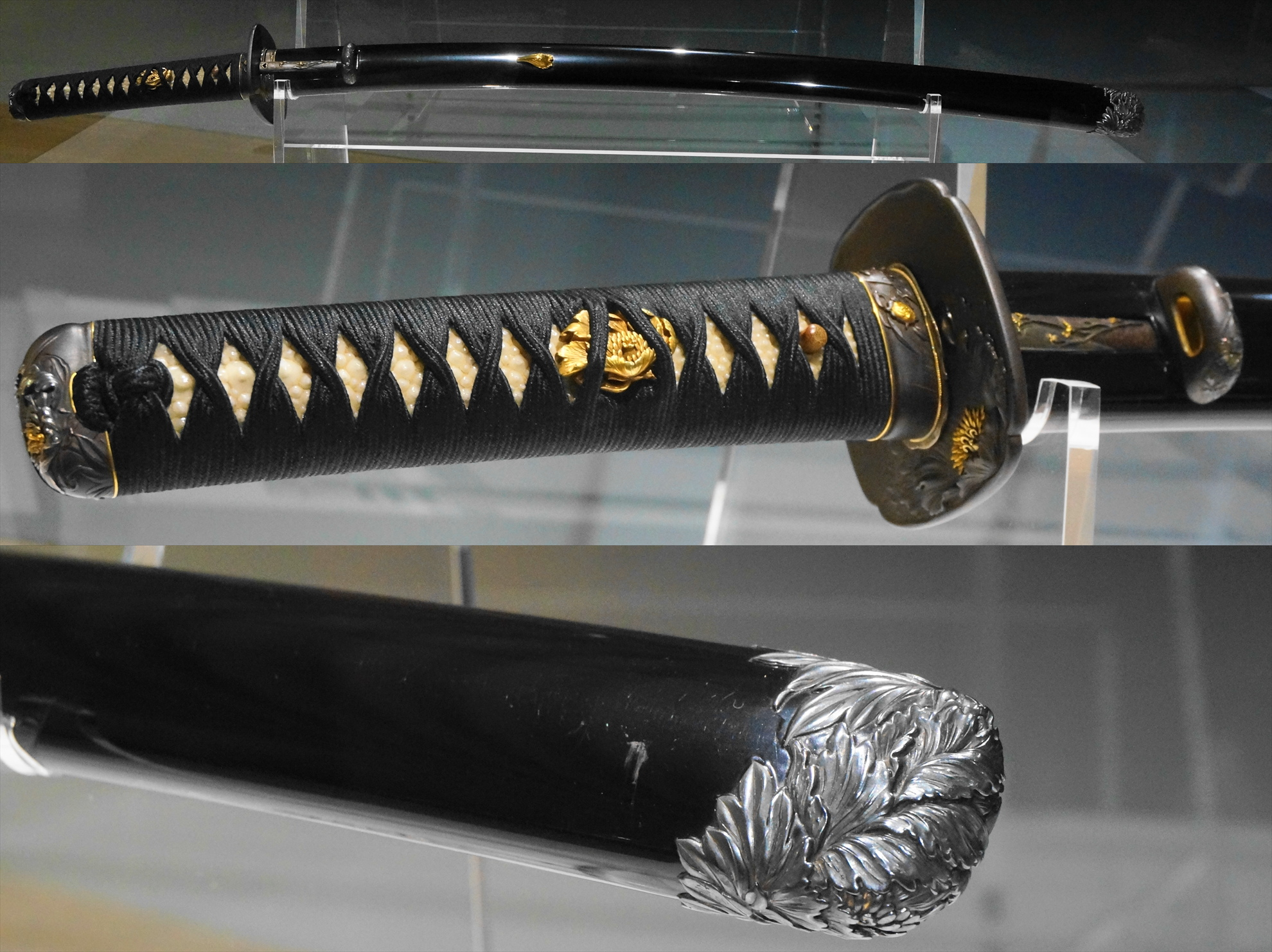
Katana mounting with a polished black lacquer sheath, Edo period. Museum of Fine Arts, Boston.

The katana (刀) style koshirae is the most commonly known koshirae and it is what is most associated with a samurai sword. Swords mounted in this manner are worn with the cutting edge up as opposed to the tachi mounting, in which the sword is worn with the cutting edge down.

==== Han-dachi (half tachi) ====
The han-dachi (半太刀) koshirae was worn katana-style but included some tachi related fittings such as a kabuto-gane instead of a kashira.

==== Aikuchi ====
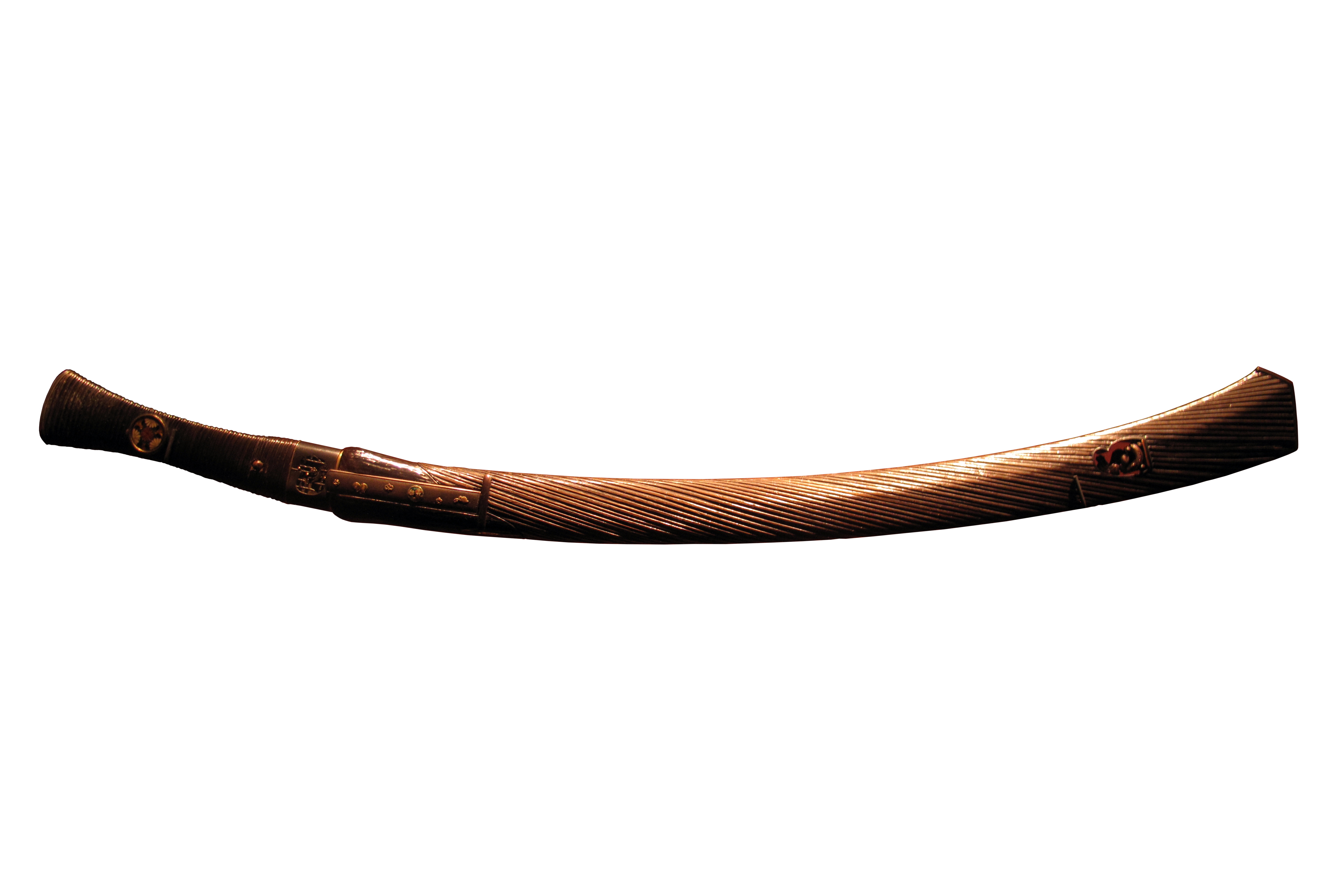
Aikuchi, c. 1780

The aikuchi (合口 or 匕首) is a form of koshirae for small swords in which the hilt and the scabbard meet without a crossguard between them. The word literally means ai ("meeting") + kuchi ("mouth; opening"), in reference to the way the hilt fits directly against the scabbard. Originally used on the koshigatana (a precursor to the wakizashi) to facilitate close wearing with armour, it became a fashionable upper-class mounting style for a tantō (literally, "small sword", nowadays regarded as a dagger) from the Kamakura period onwards.

==== Shikomizue ====
The shikomizue (仕込み杖, "prepared cane") or jotō (杖刀, "staff sword") is a Japanese swordstick. It is most famous for its use by the fictional swordmaster Zatoichi. The sword blade was placed in a cane-like mounting (tsue) as concealment. These mountings are not to be confused with the Shirasaya (白鞘, "white scabbard"), which were just plain wooden mountings with no decoration other than (sometimes) a short description of the contents.

According to Hatsumi Masaaki, some shikomi-zue also concealed metsubushi, chains, hooks, and many other things. Shikomi-zue could be carried in public without arousing suspicion, making them perfect tools for shinobi. However, this is a debatable topic in koryu circles.

==== Kaiken ====
The kaiken (懐剣) is an 8–10 inch long, single- or double-edged dagger without ornamental fittings housed in a plain mount, formerly carried by men and women of the samurai class in Japan. It was useful for self-defense indoors where the long katana and intermediate wakizashi were inconvenient. Women carried them in their kimono either in a pocket-like fold or in the sleeve for self-defense or for suicide by means of slashing the jugular veins and carotid artery in the left side of the neck.

=== Koshirae gallery ===
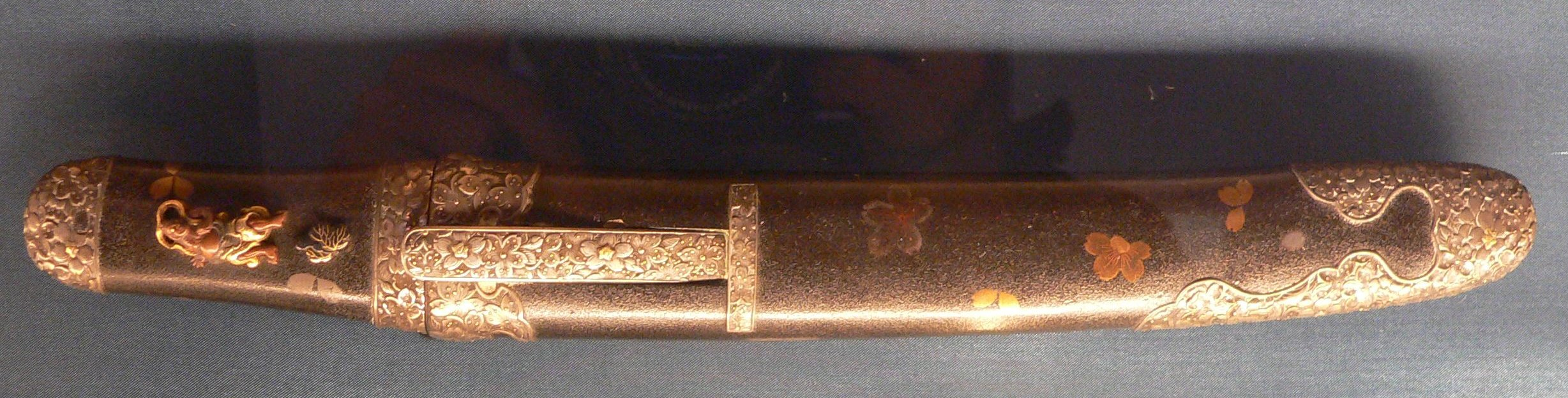
Tantō mounted in aikuchi style koshirae

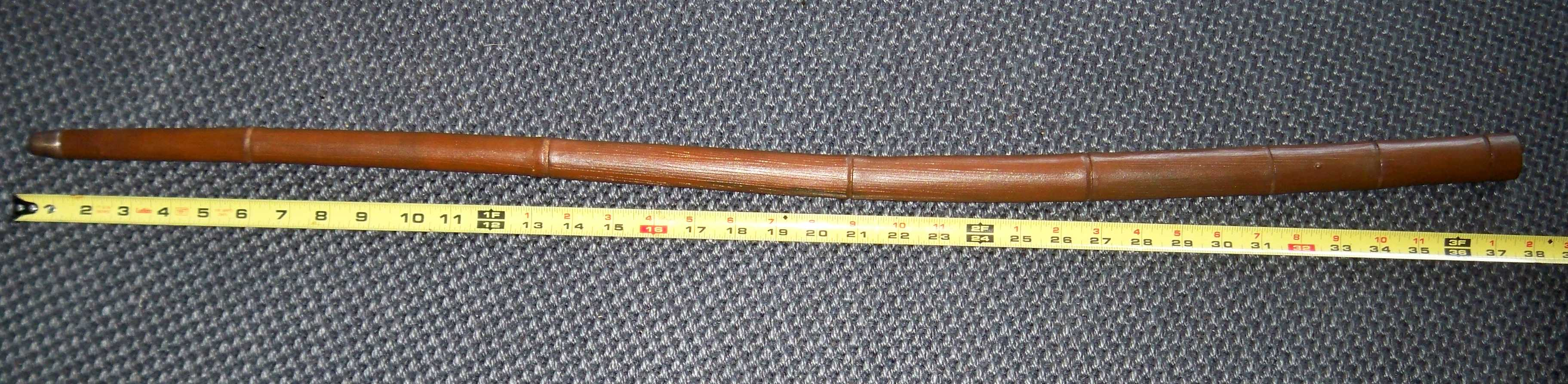
Shikomizue koshirae

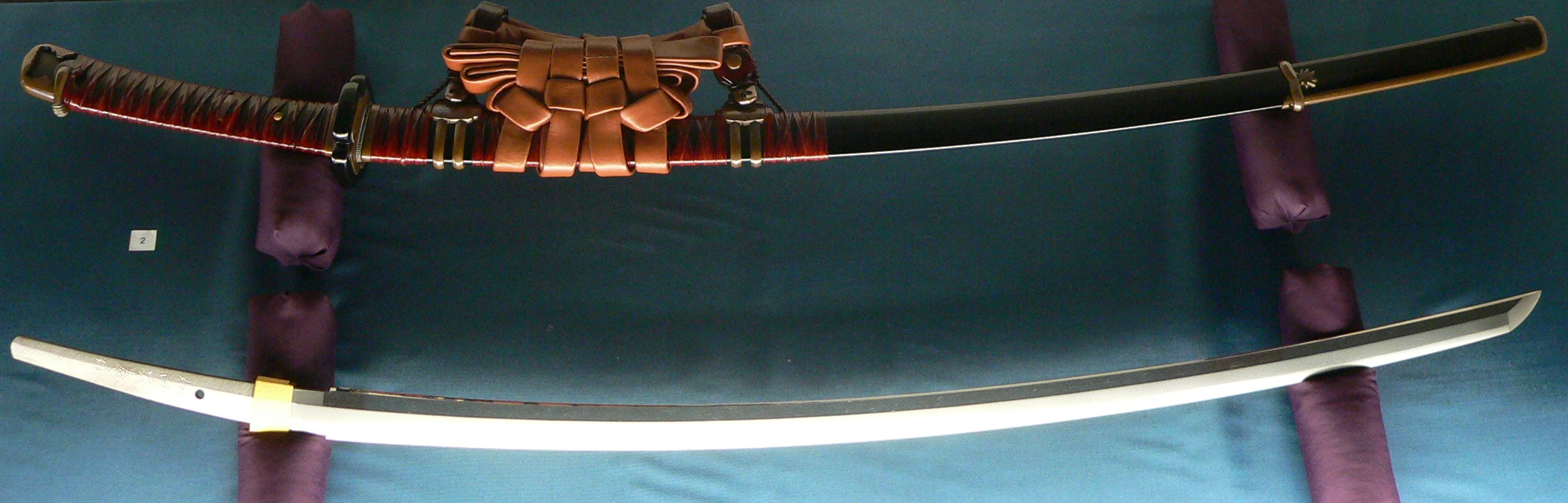
Tachi and tachi koshirae

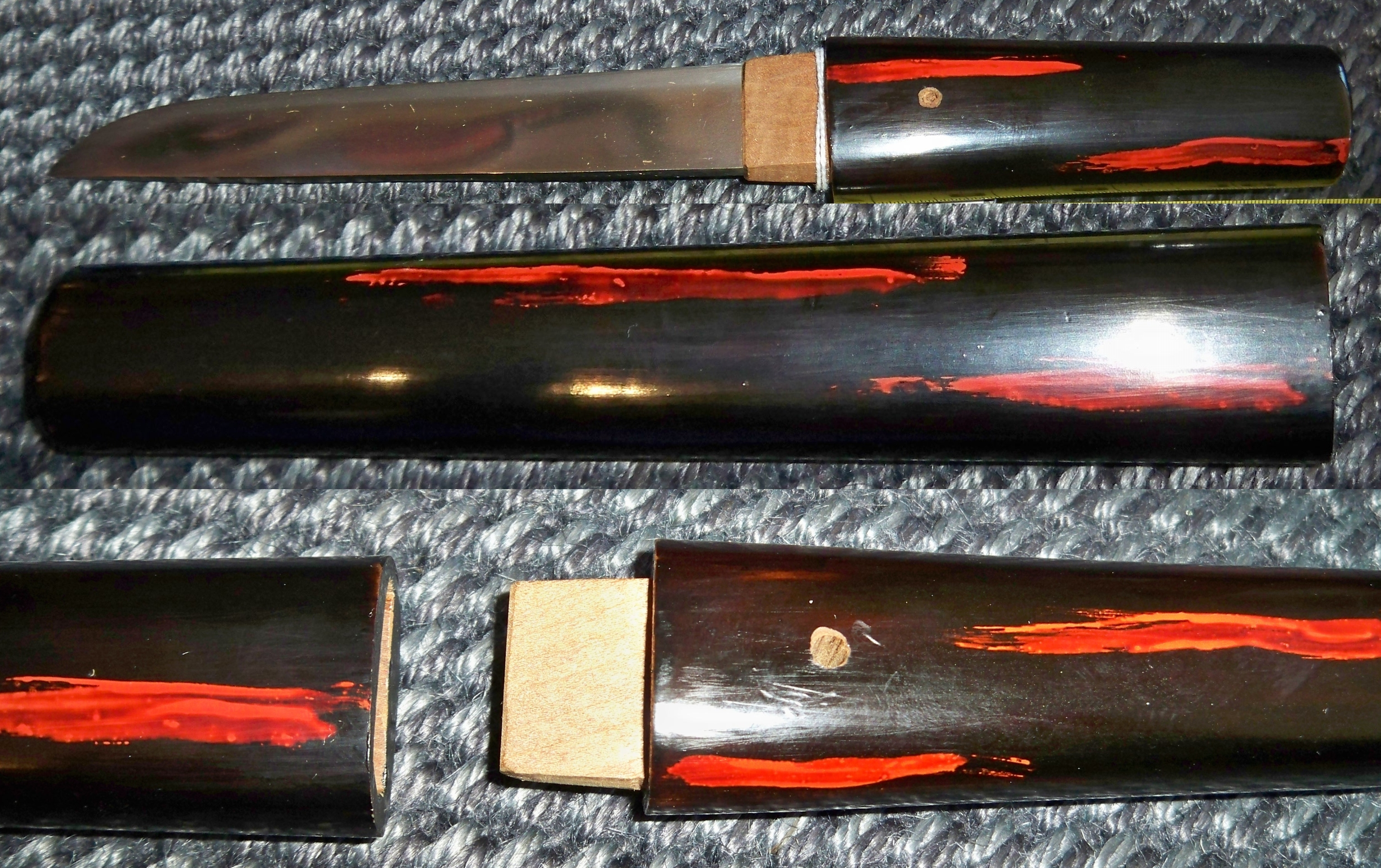
Kaiken (kwaiken) tanto

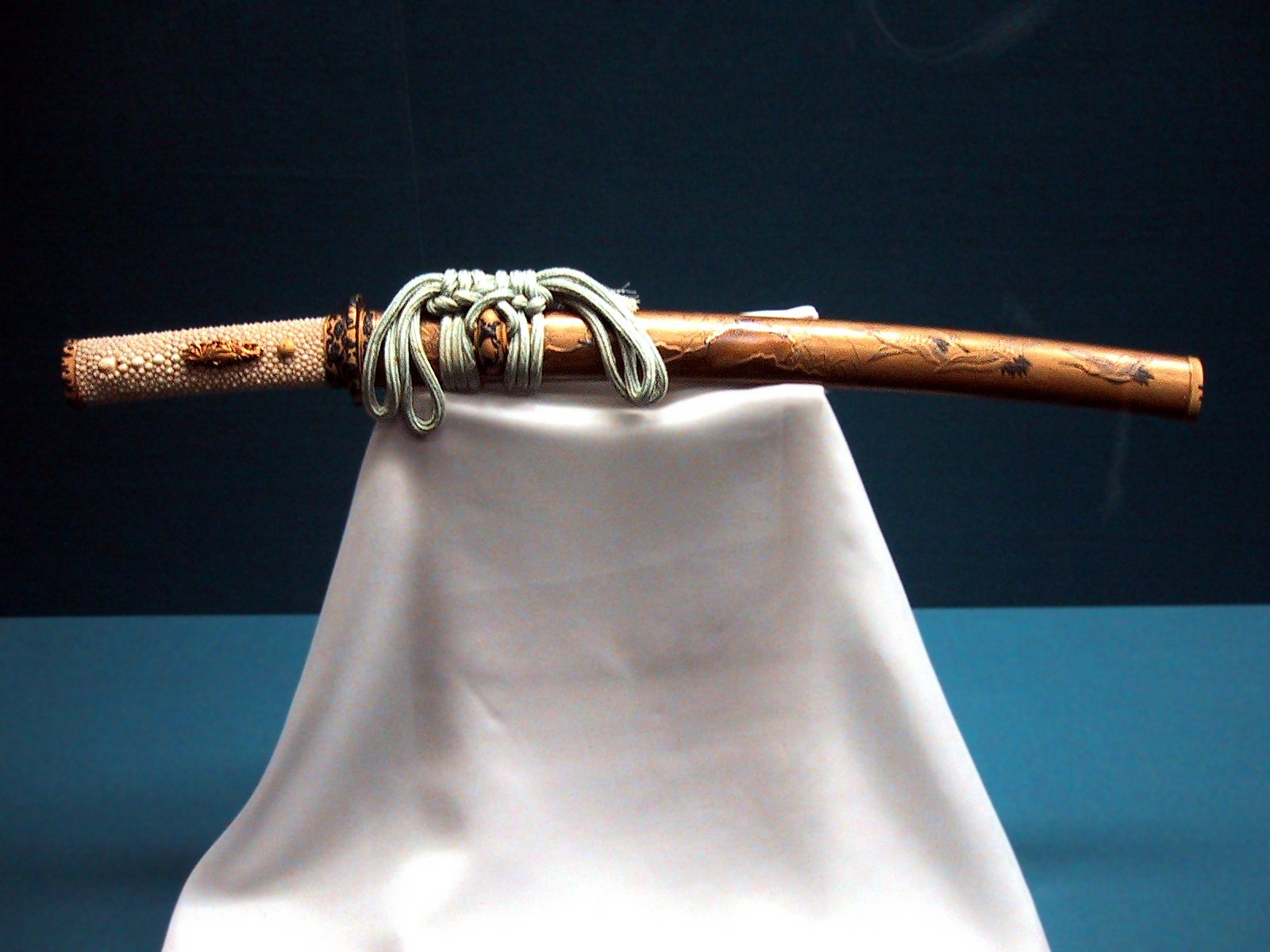
Wakizashi koshirae

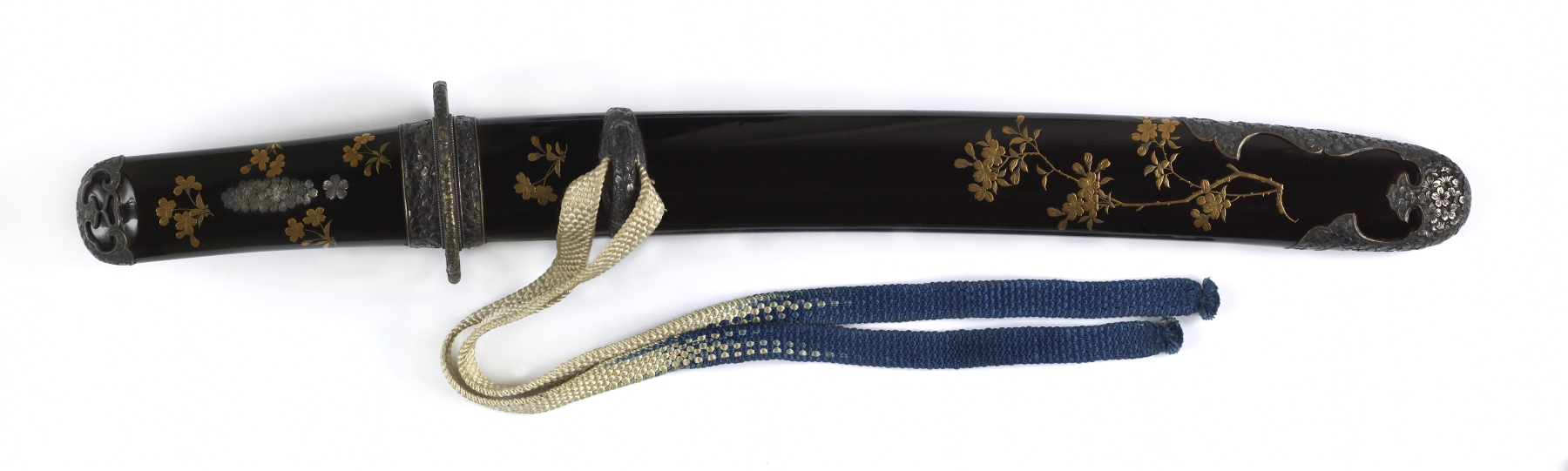
Tanto koshirae

=== Parts of the koshirae ===
==== Saya ====
Saya (鞘) is the Japanese term for a scabbard, and specifically refers to the scabbard for a sword or knife. The saya of a koshirae (scabbards for practical use) are normally manufactured from very lightweight wood, with a coat of lacquer on the exterior. Correct drawing and sheathing of the blade involves contacting the mune (the back of the blade) rather than ha (the edge) to the inside of the scabbard. The saya also has a horn knob (栗形, kurigata) on one side for attaching a braided cord (sageo), and may have a shitodome (mounting loop) to accent the kurigata as well as an end cap (小尻, kojiri) made from metal. Traditionally the koiguchi (the throat of the scabbard) and kojiri (the chape) were made from buffalo horn.

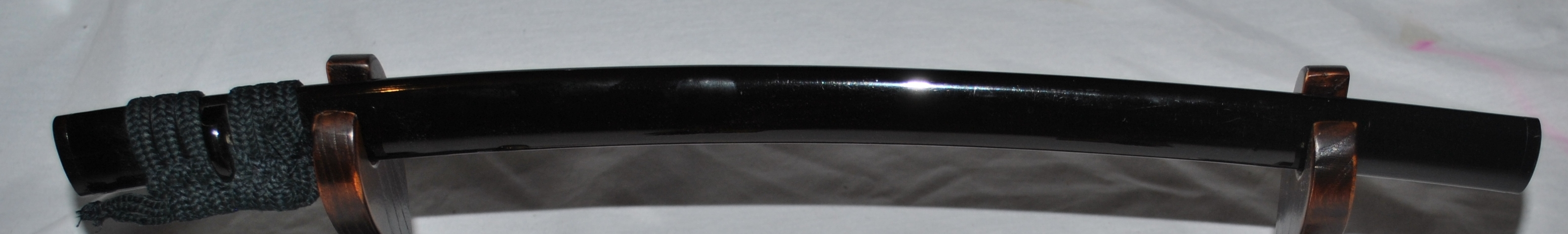
Katana saya

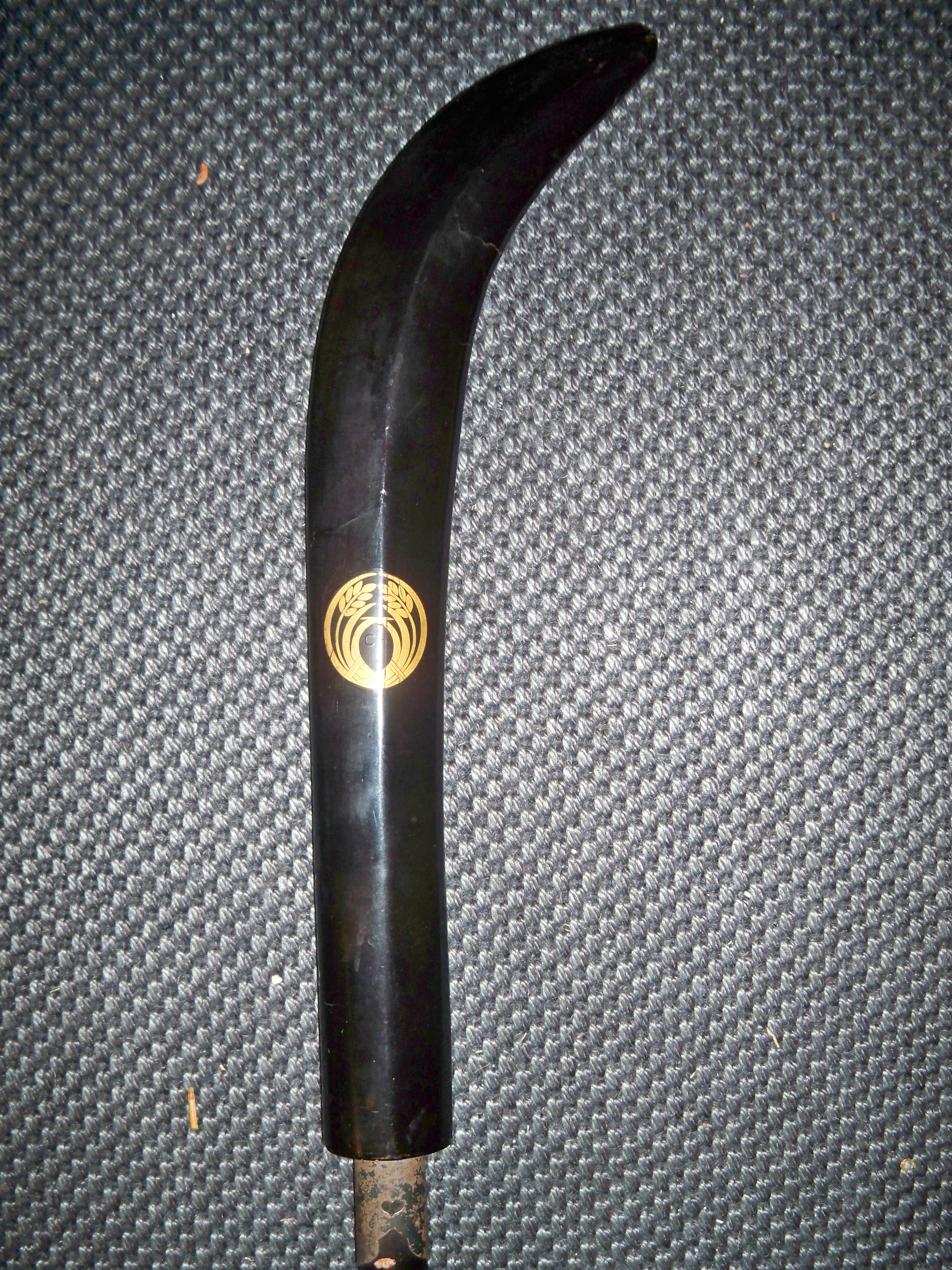
Naginata saya

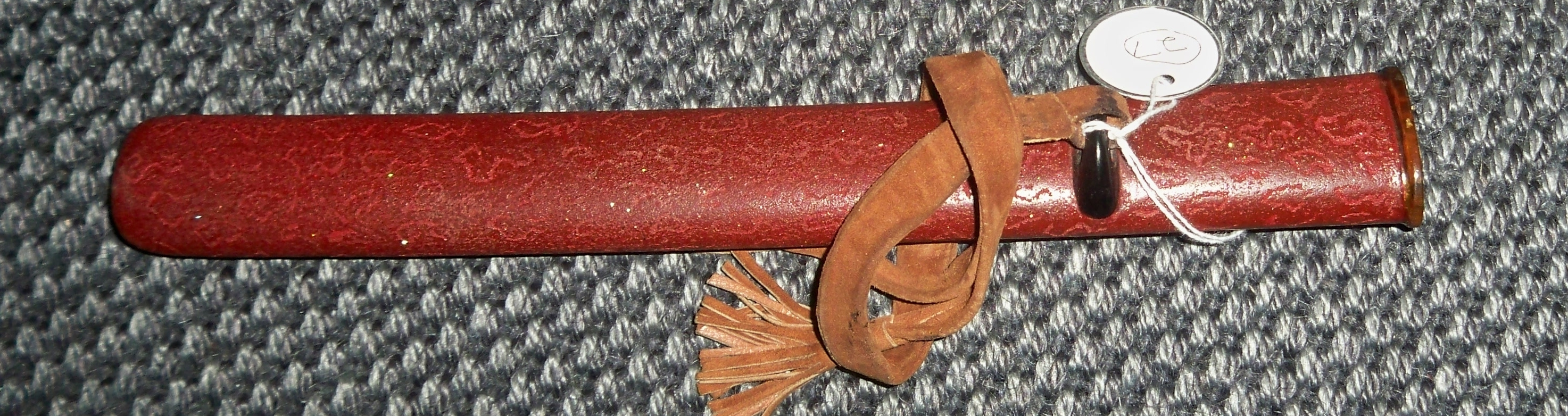
Tanto saya

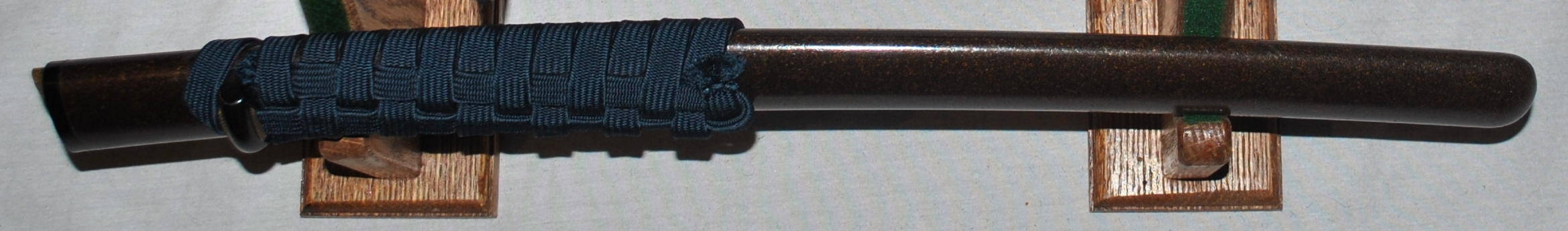
Wakizashi saya

The Saya is divided in parts:

- Sageo

A sageo (下緒 or 下げ緒) is a hanging cord made of silk, cotton or leather that is passed through the hole in the kurigata (栗形) of a Japanese sword's saya. There are a number of different methods for wrapping and tying the sageo on the saya for display purposes. Other uses for the sageo are tying the sword to the samurai and hojojutsu. The samurai felt the sageo formed a spiritual bond between them and the sword, and they were very particular about tying it correctly when the sword was not in use.

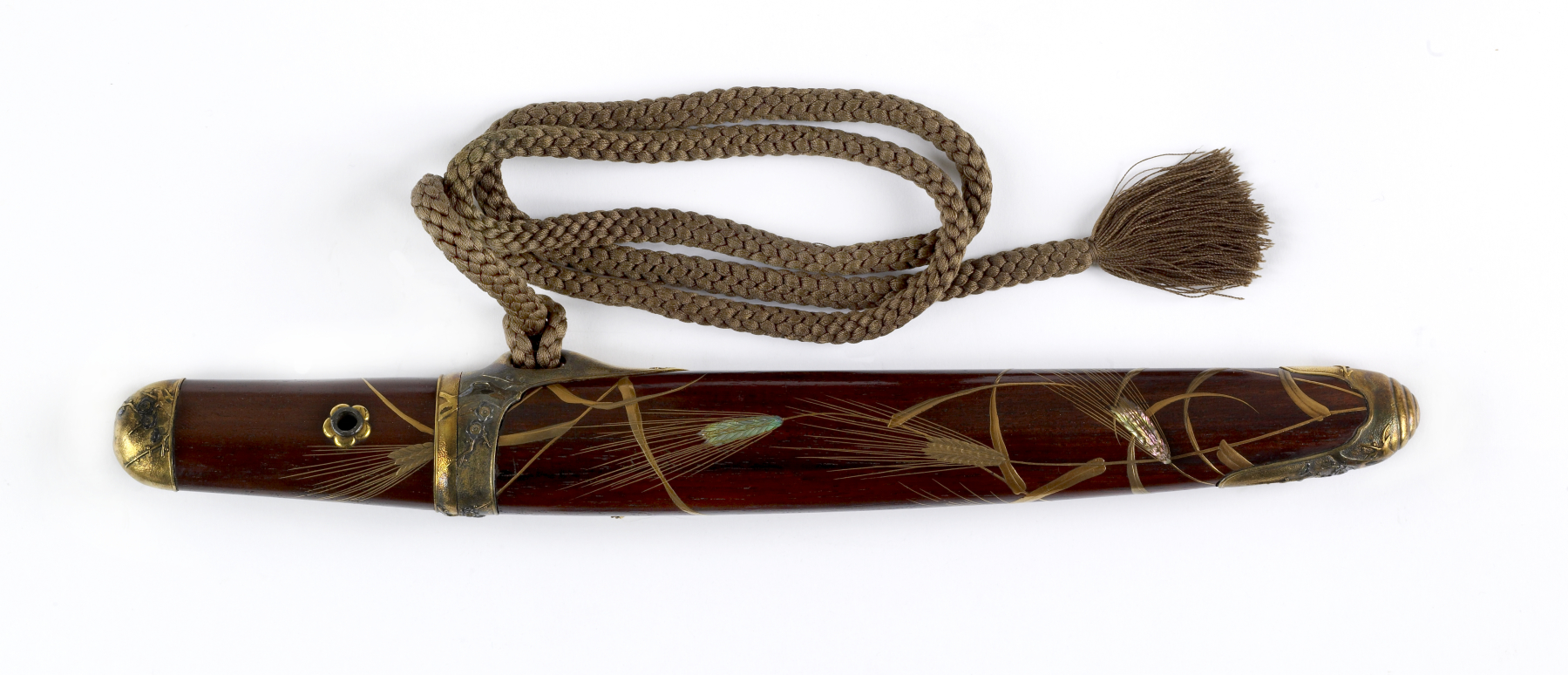

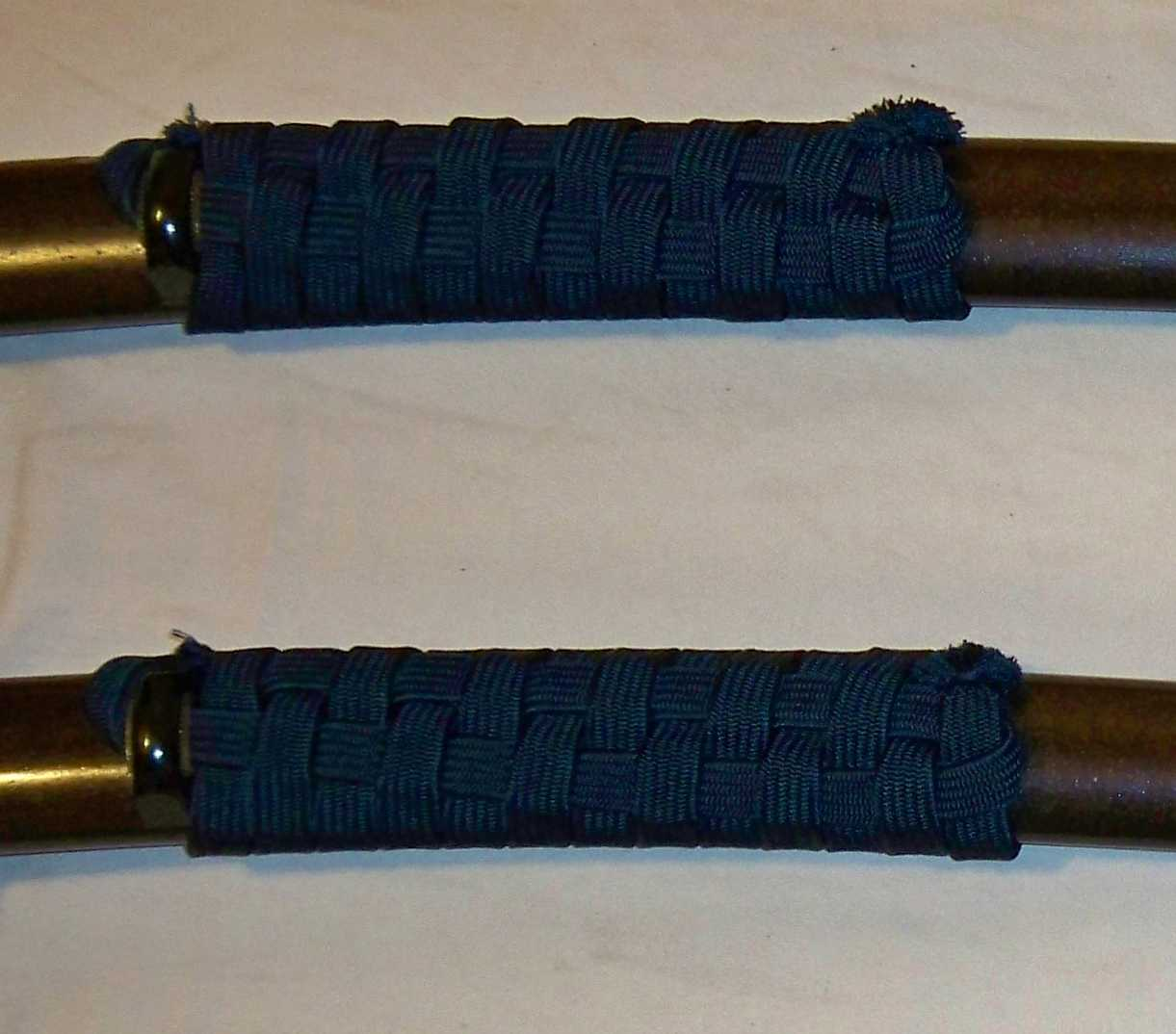
A matched set (daisho) of sageo

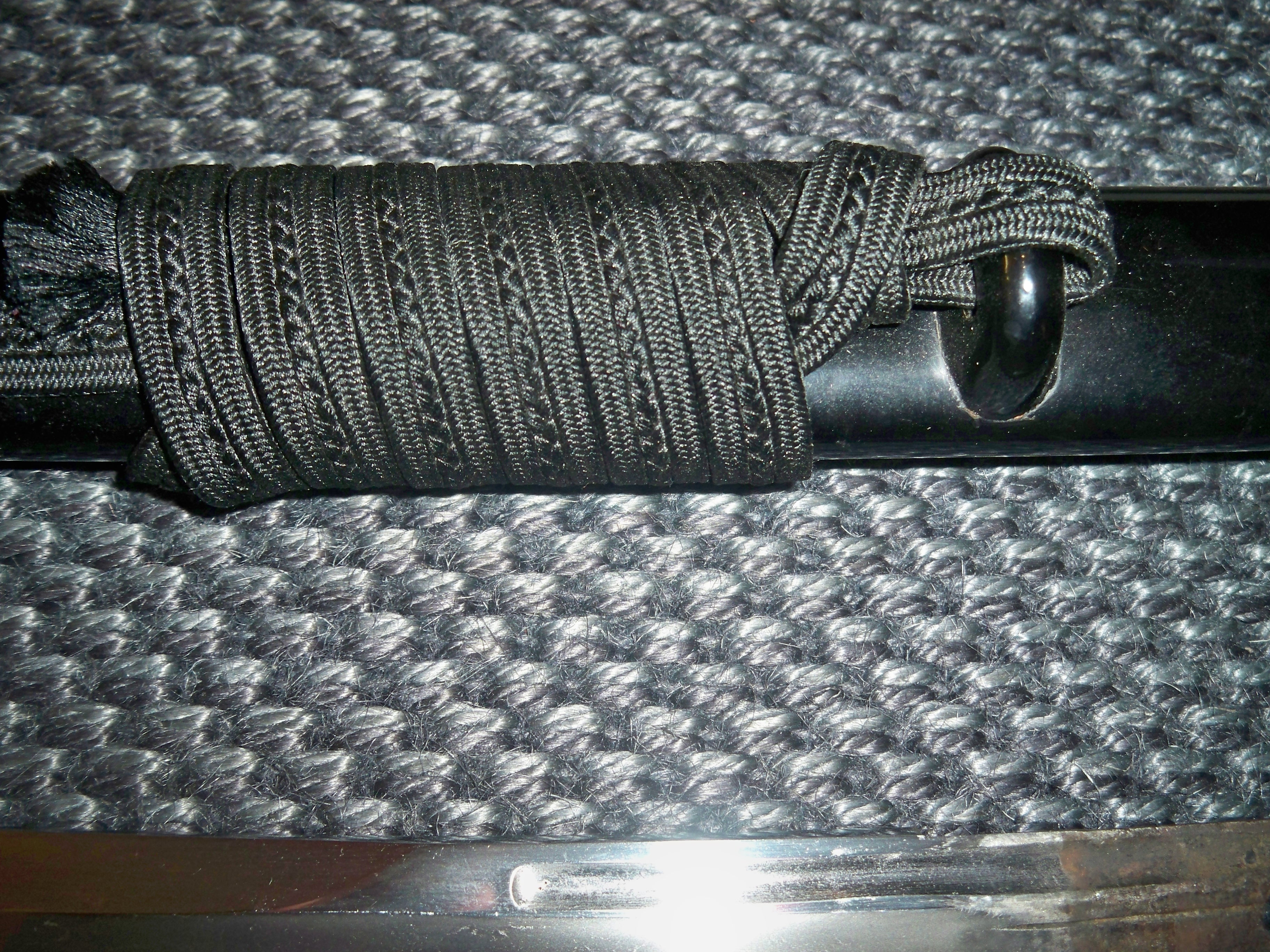
- Kuri-kata

The kurikata (栗形) is a knob that is attached to the scabbard of a Japanese sword. The sageo (cord) that secures the saya of the sword to the obi (belt) goes through a hole in the kurikata.

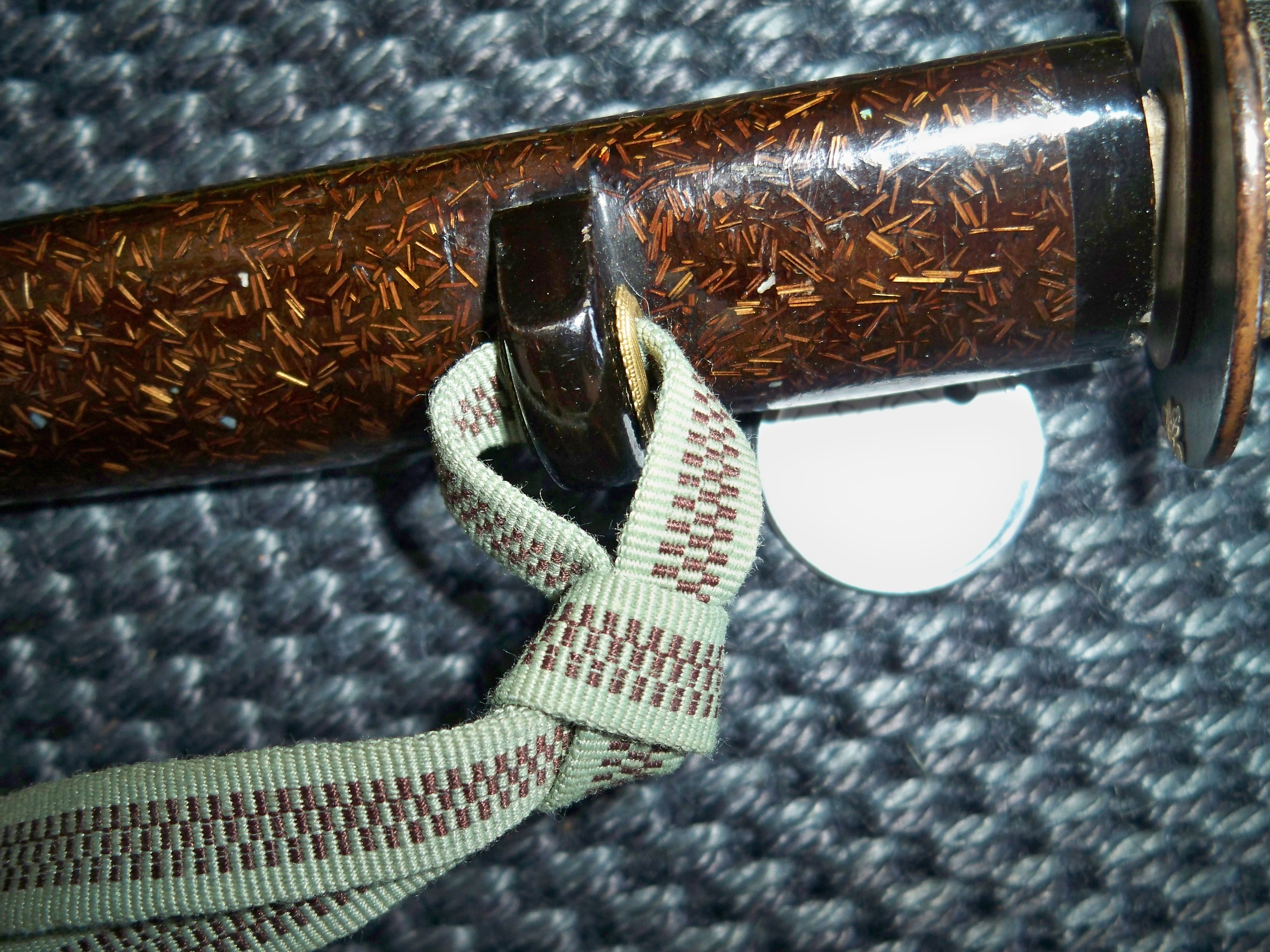

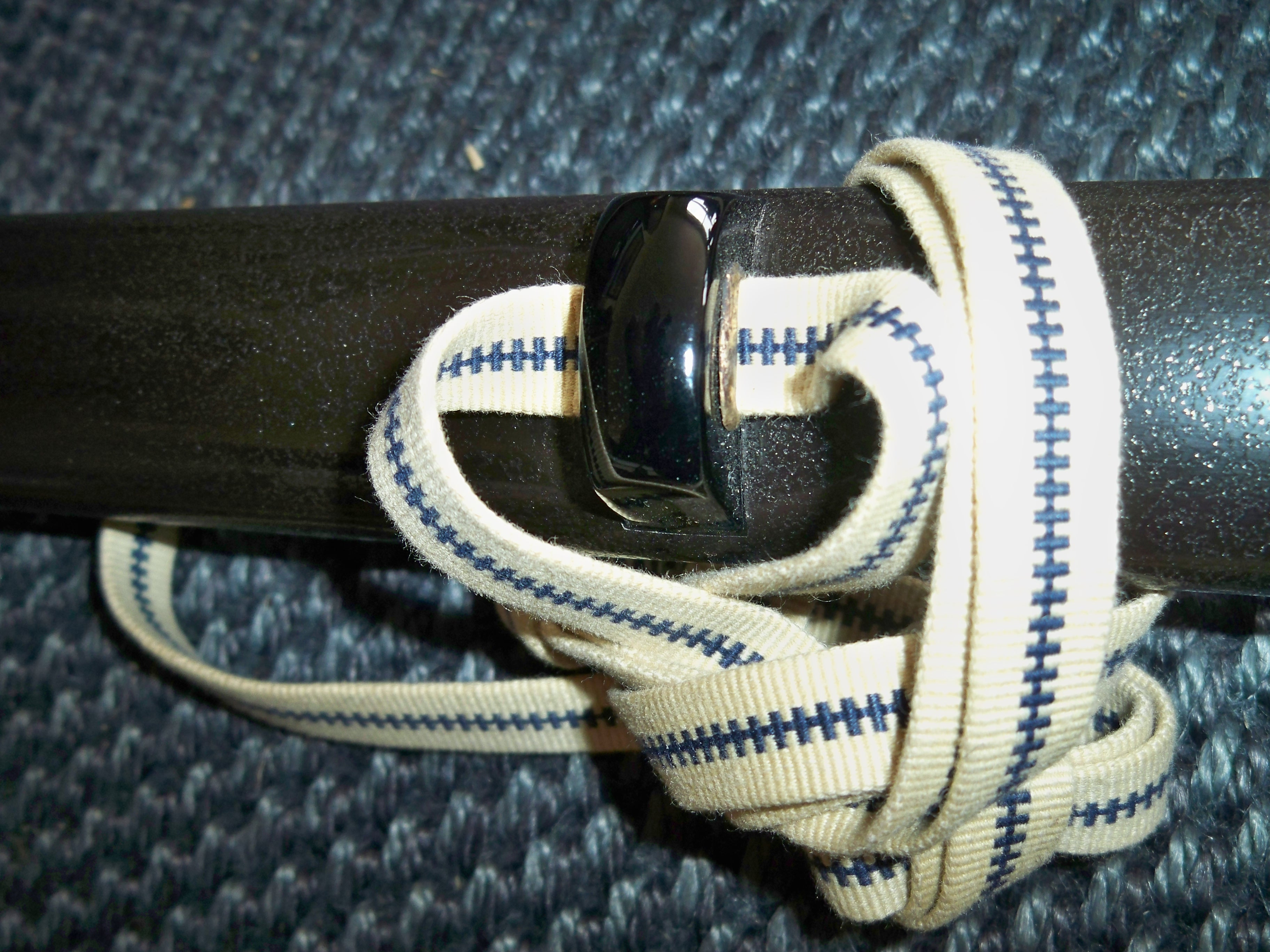

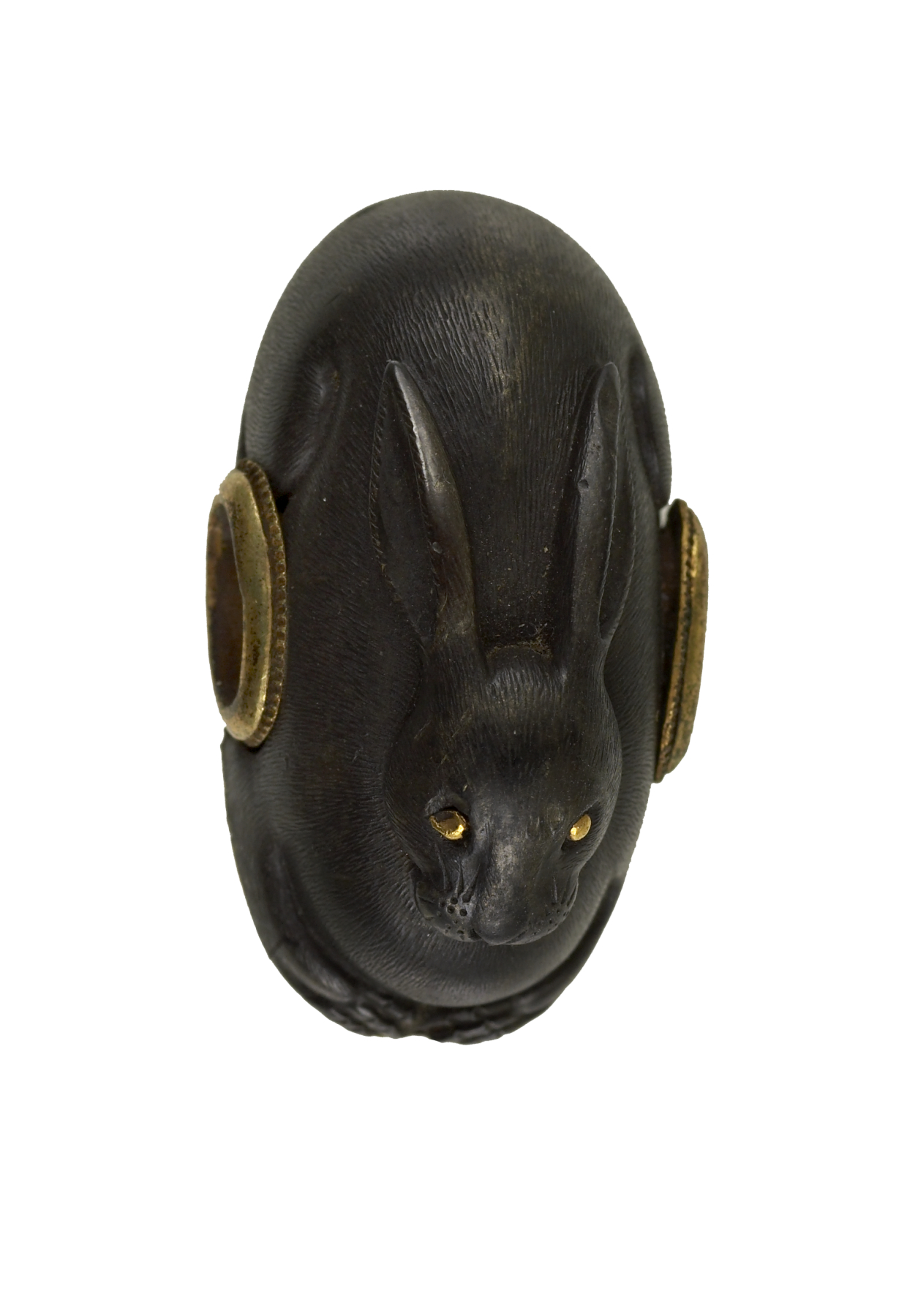

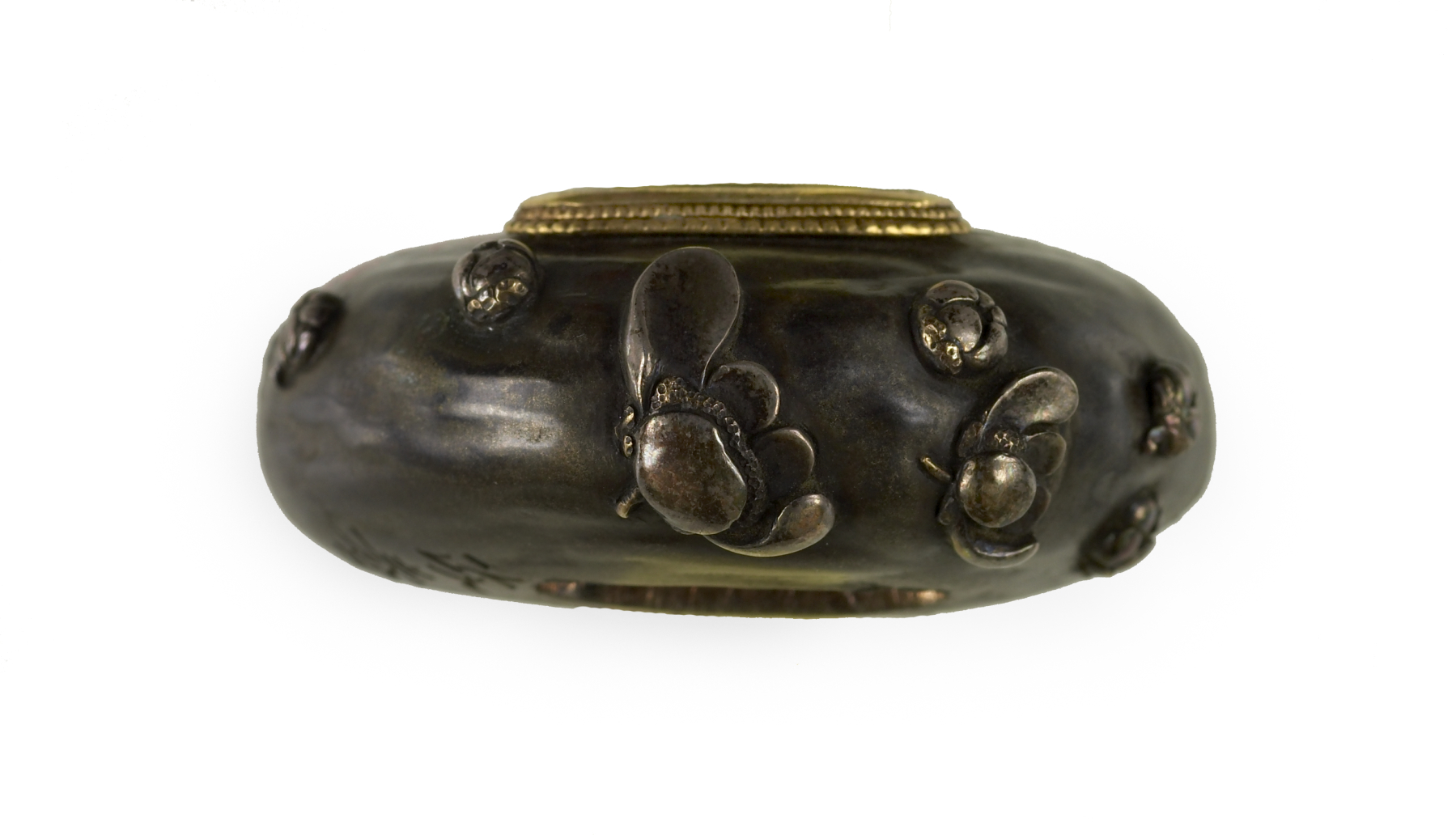

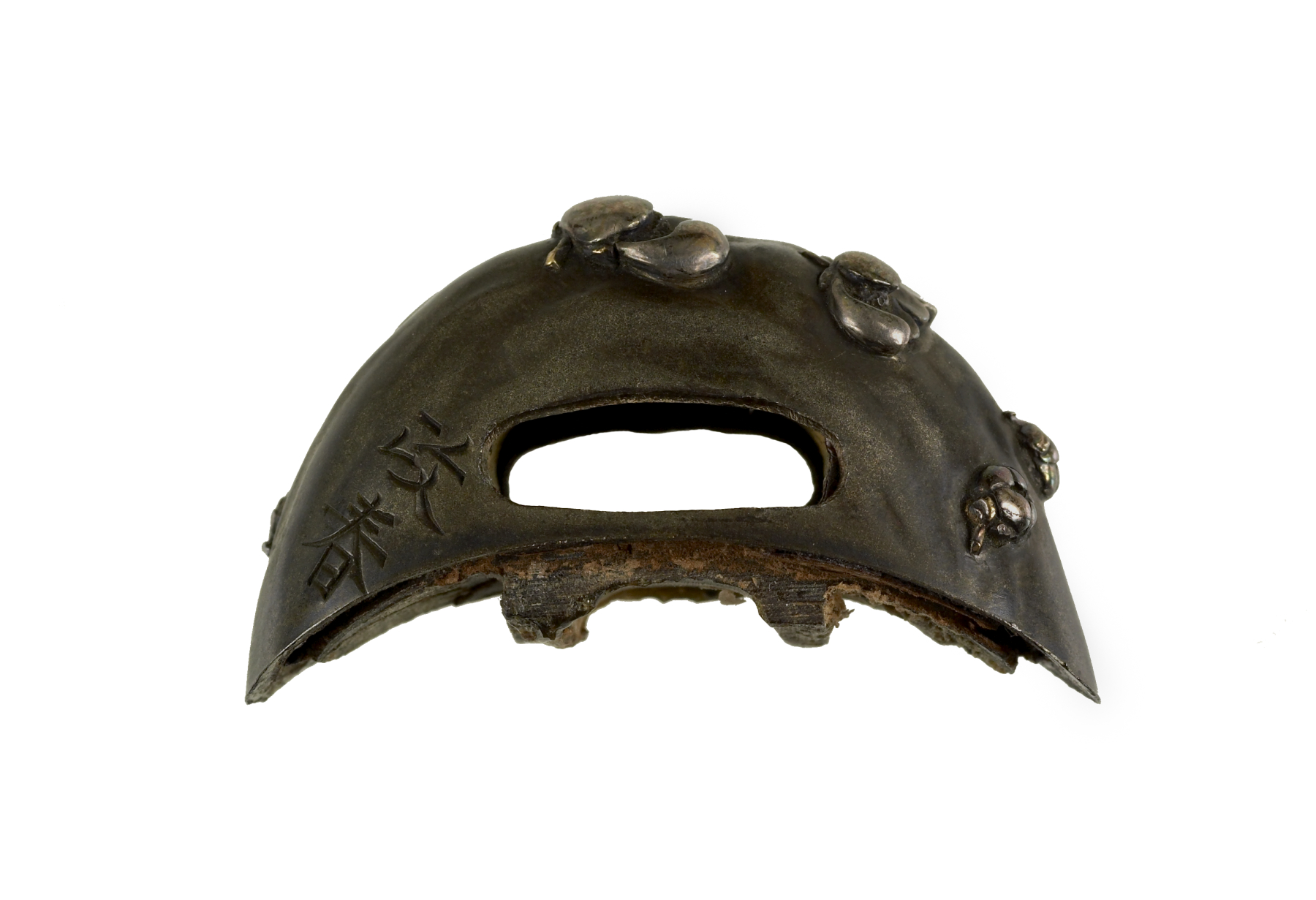
- Kojiri

The kojiri (鐺) is the end cap of the scabbard or the protective fitting at the end of the scabbard.

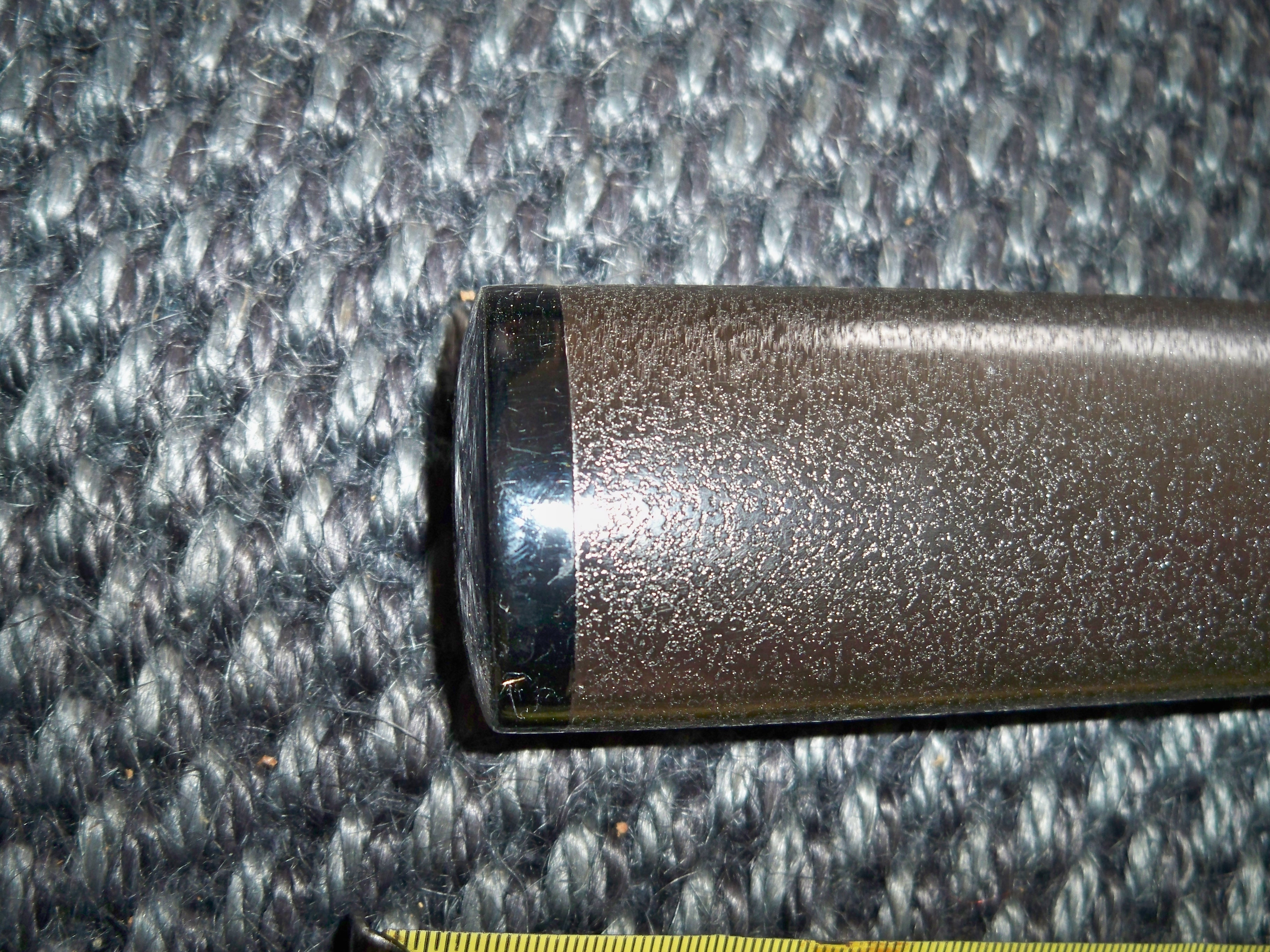

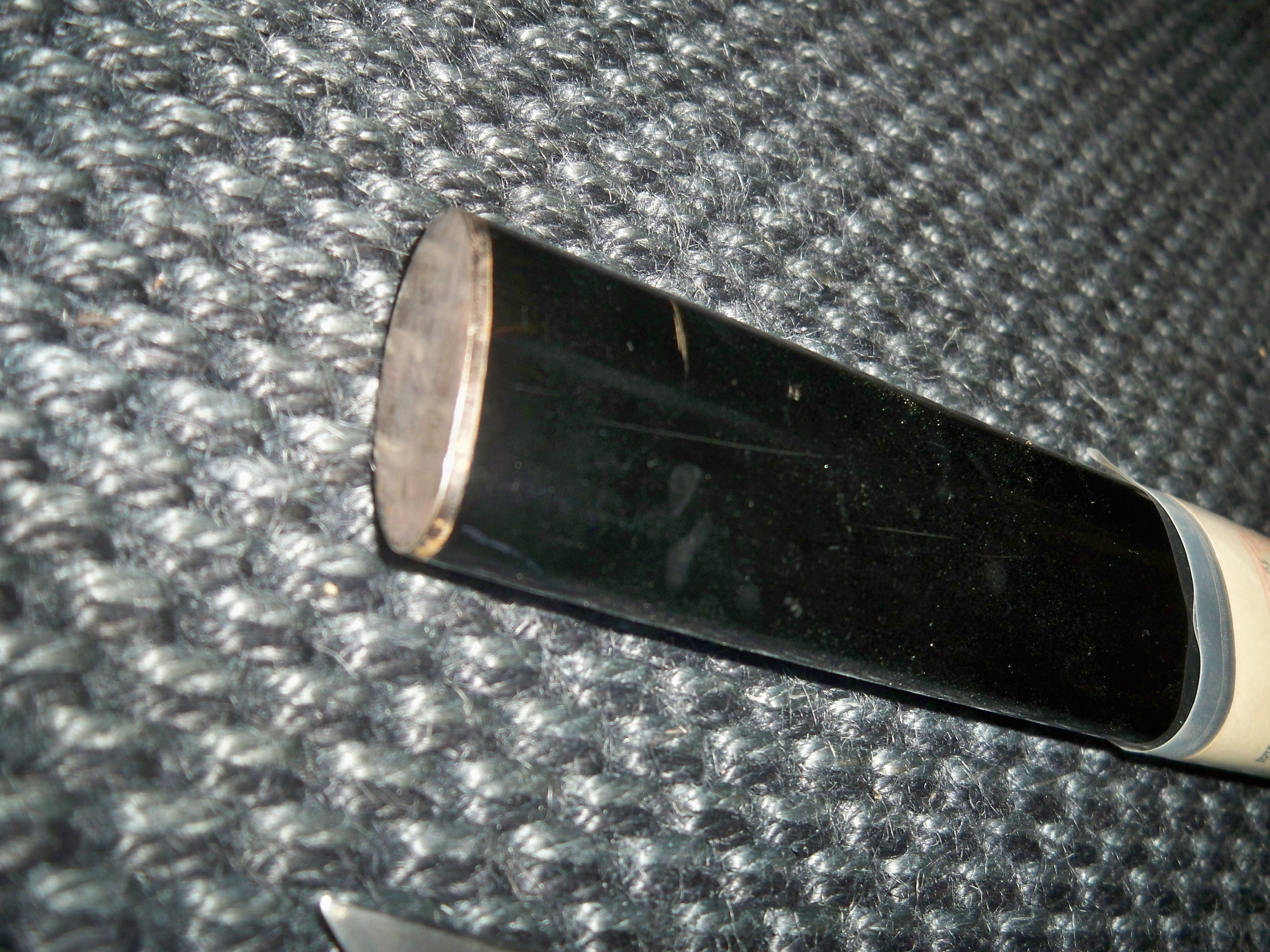

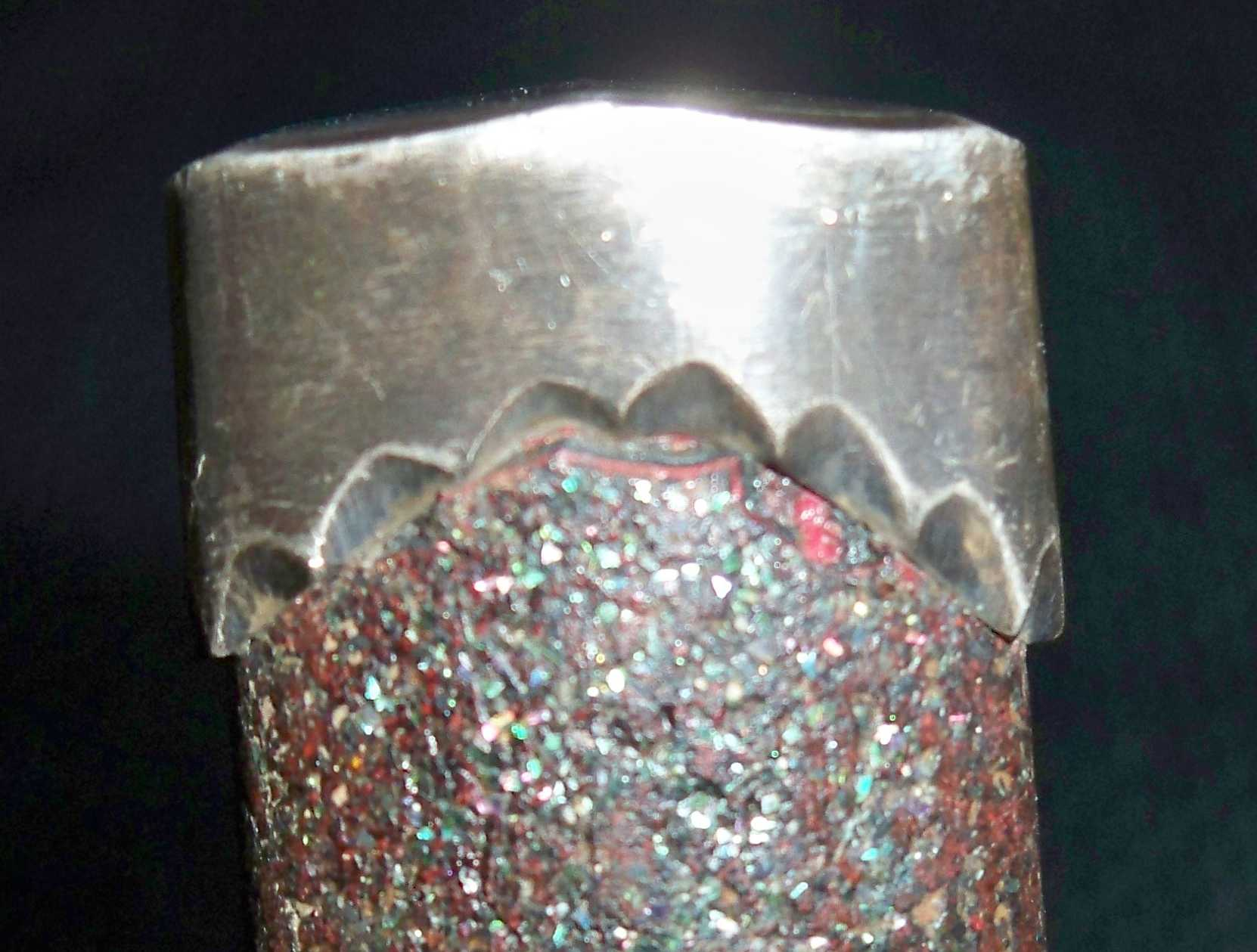

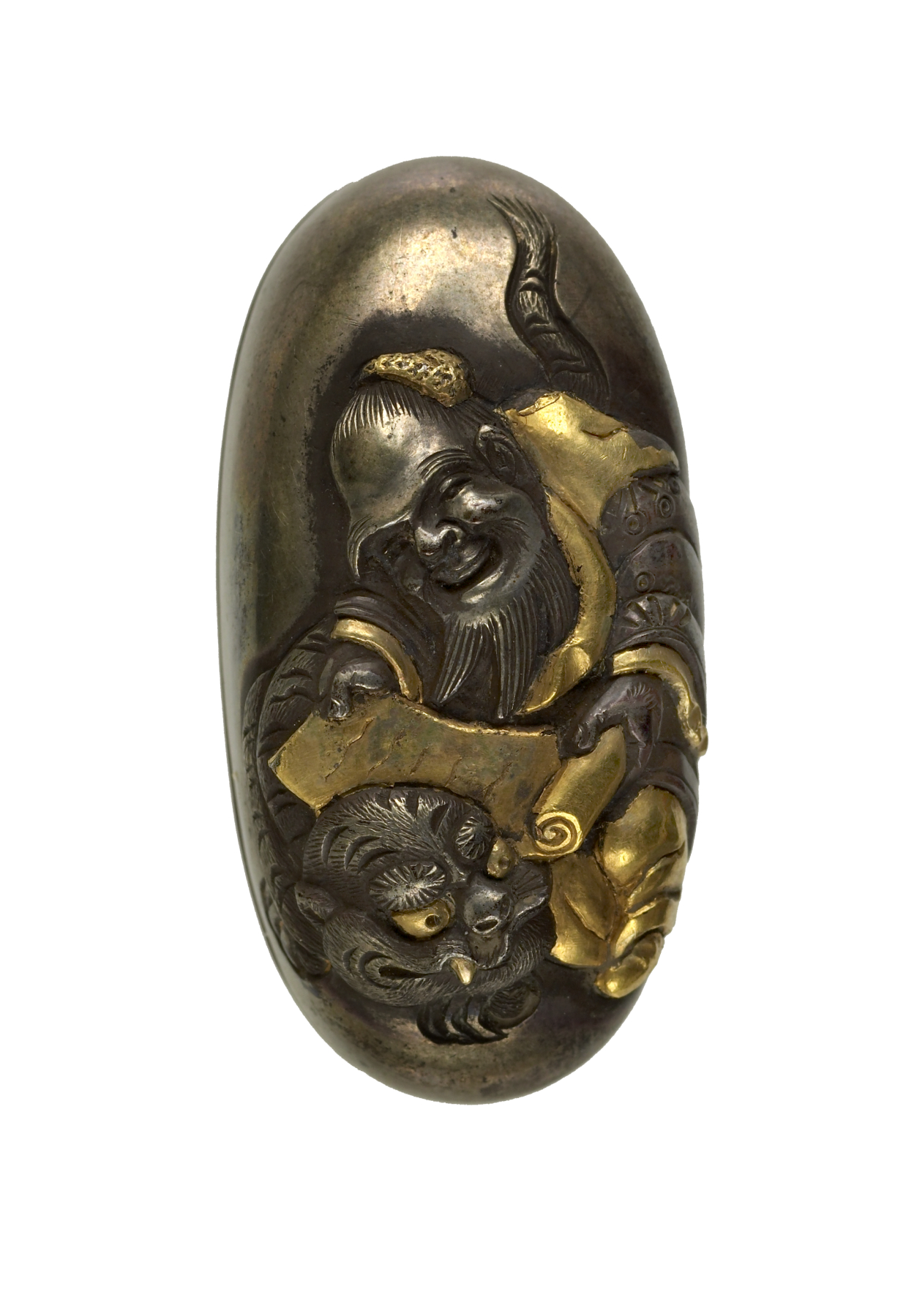

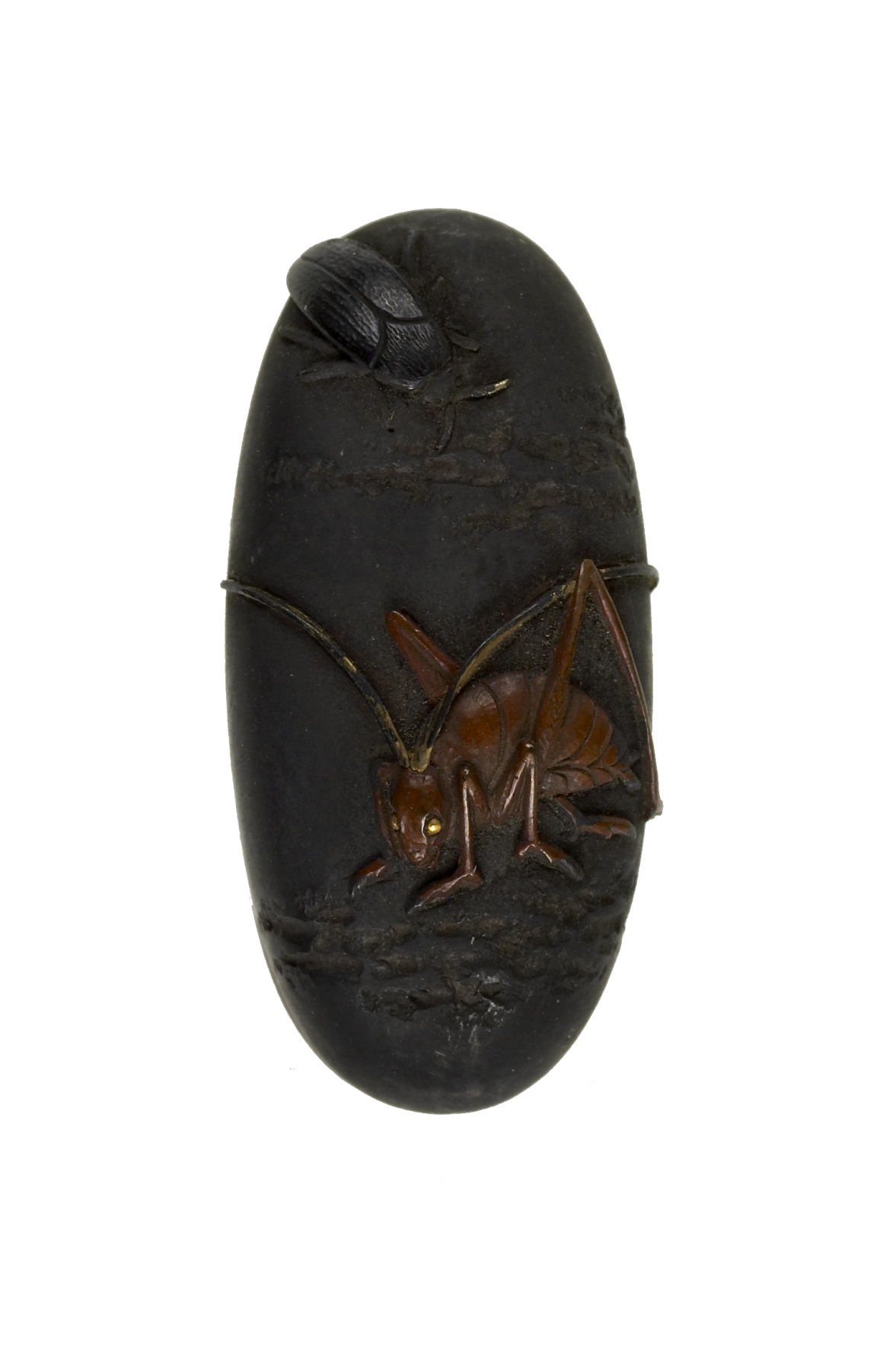
- Kogatana and kozuka

Kogatana (小刀), a small utility knife that fits into a pocket on the scabbard, the kozuka is the decorative handle for the kogatana.

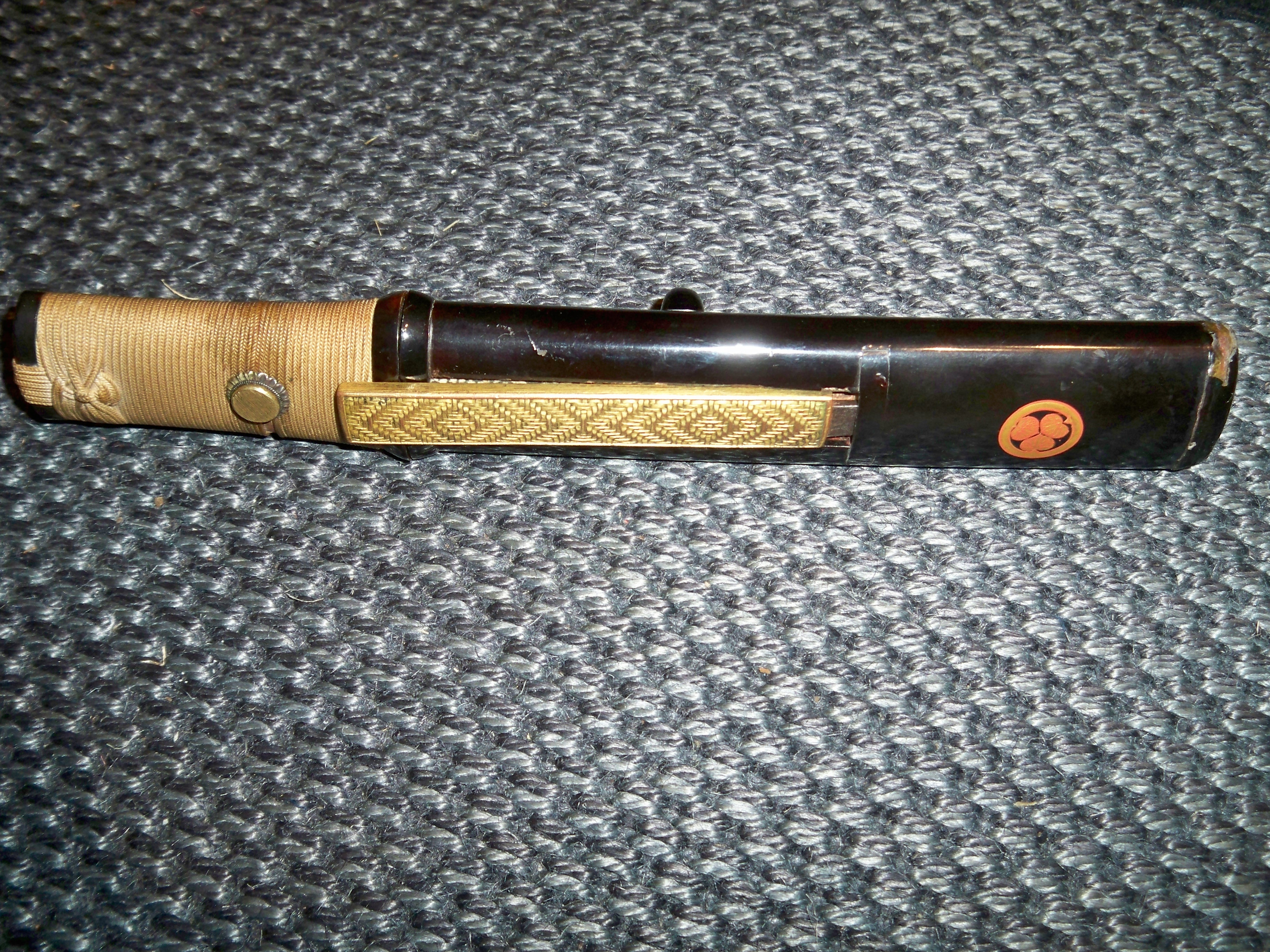

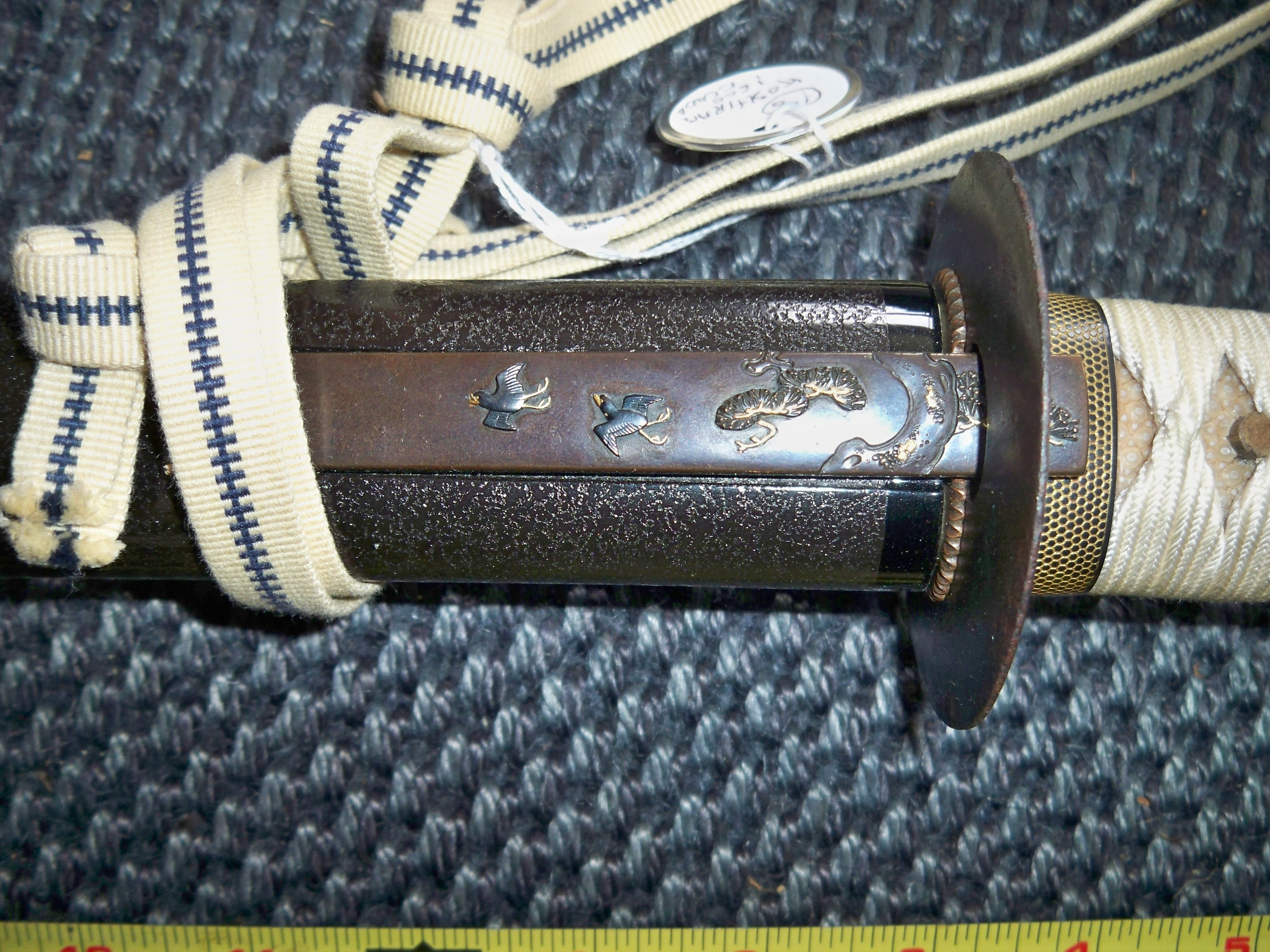

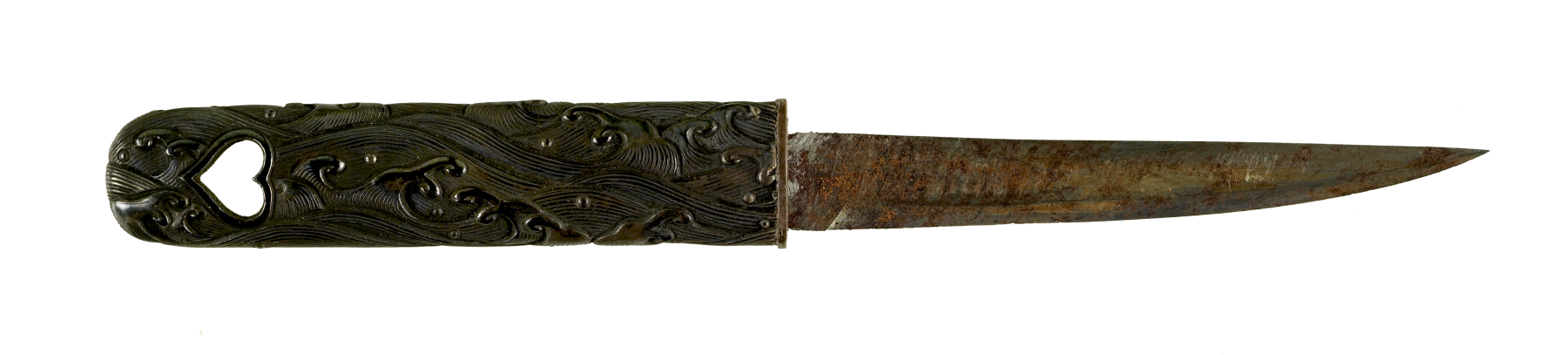

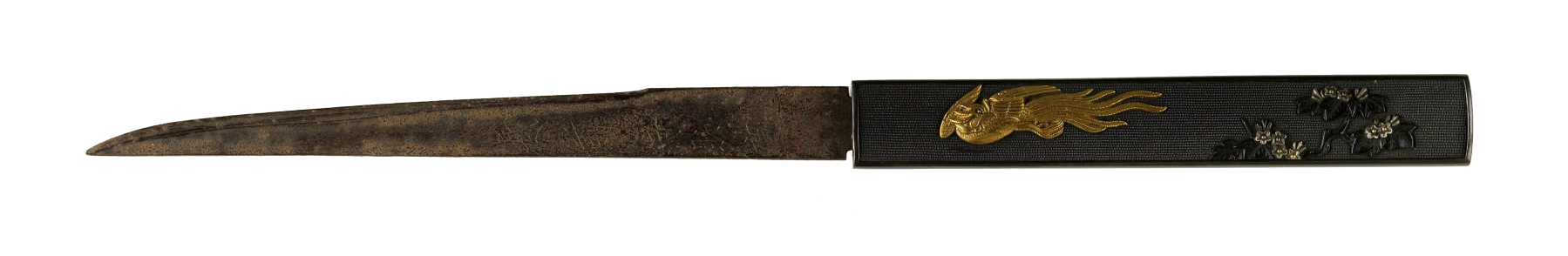

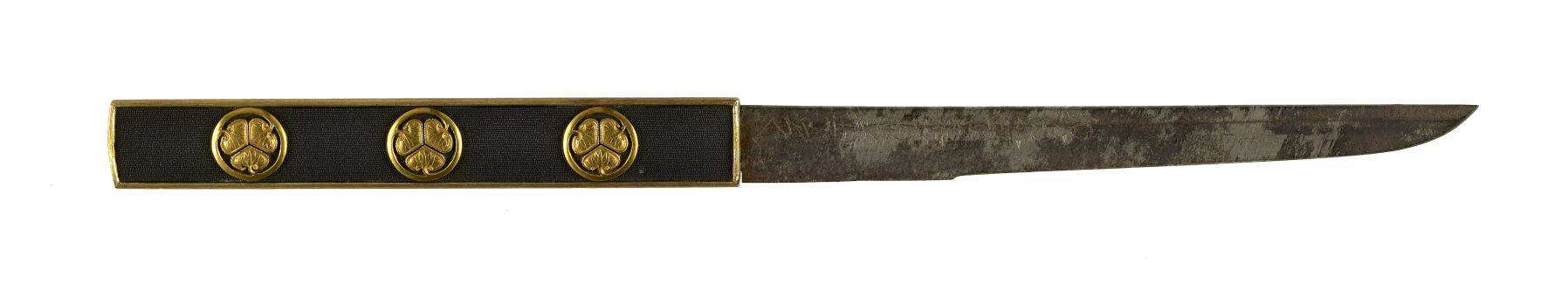
- kōgai

The kōgai (笄) is a spike for hair arranging that fits into a pocket on the saya.

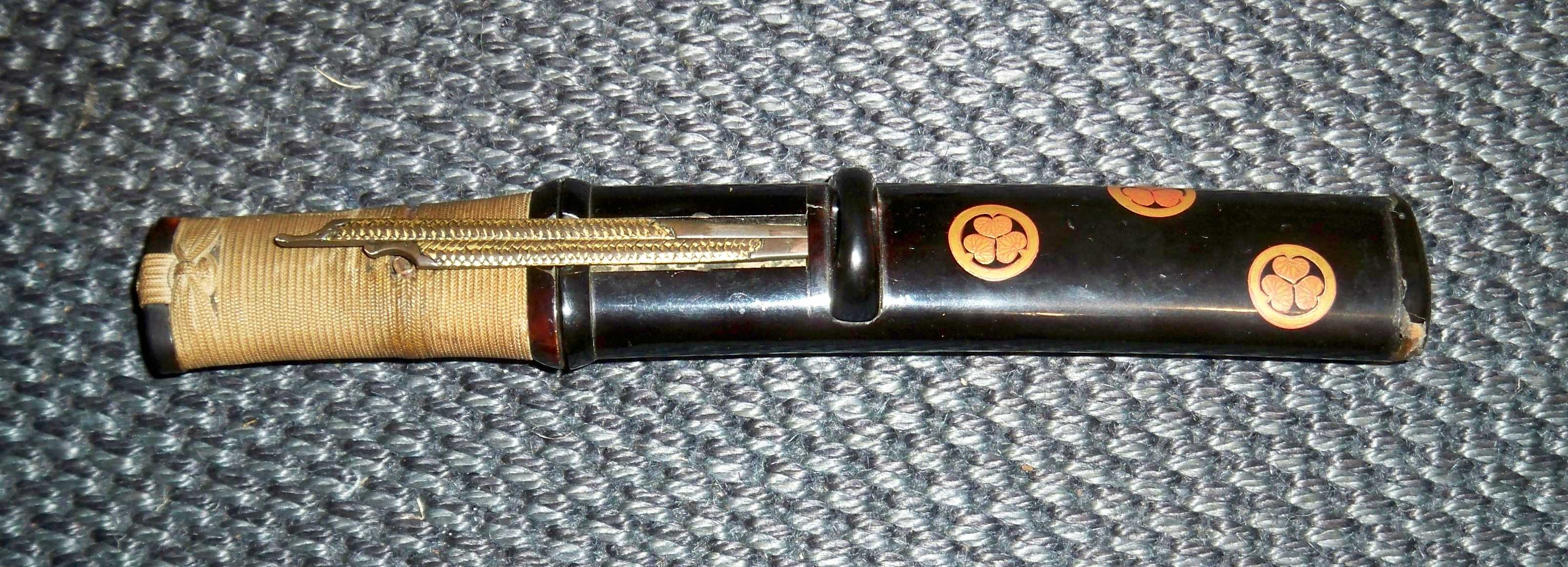
Tanto koshirae showing a kōgai in its pocket

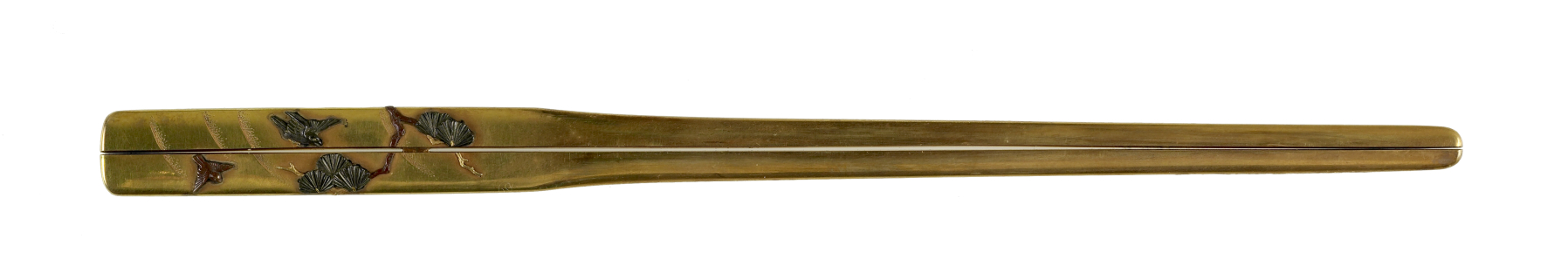

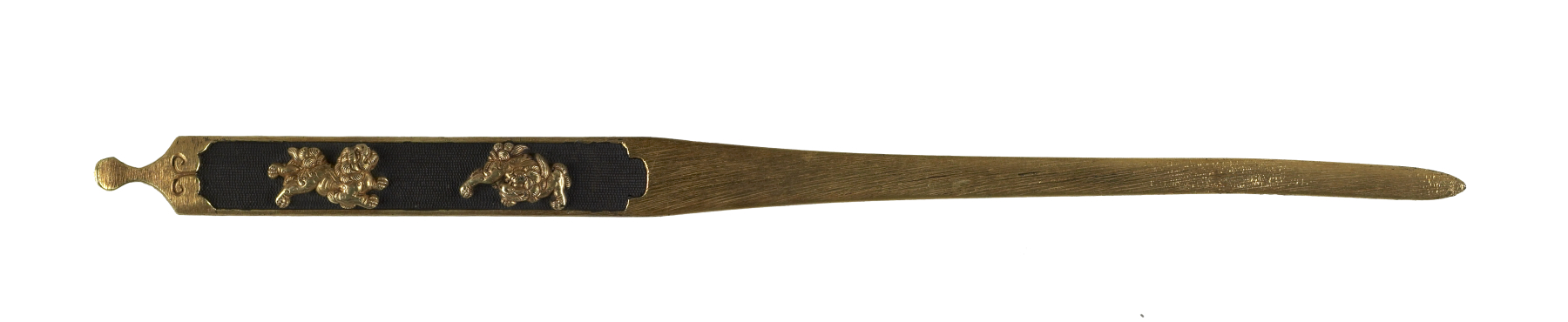

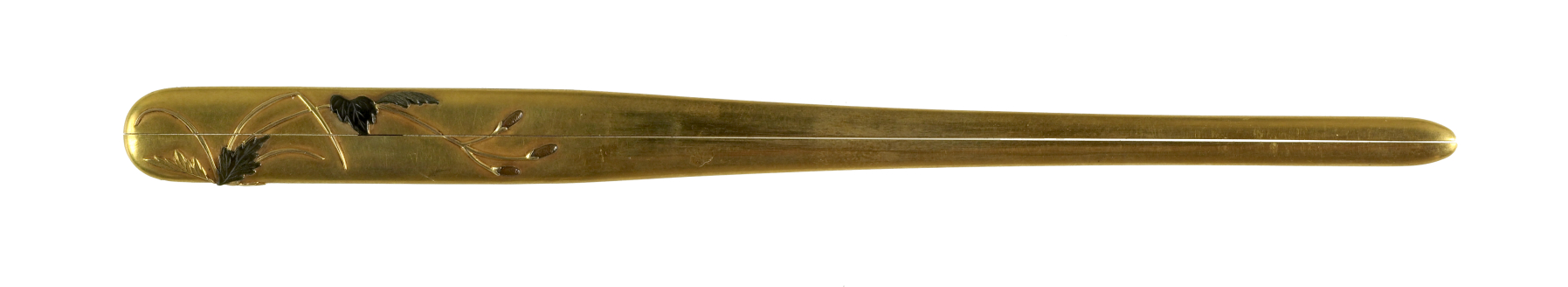

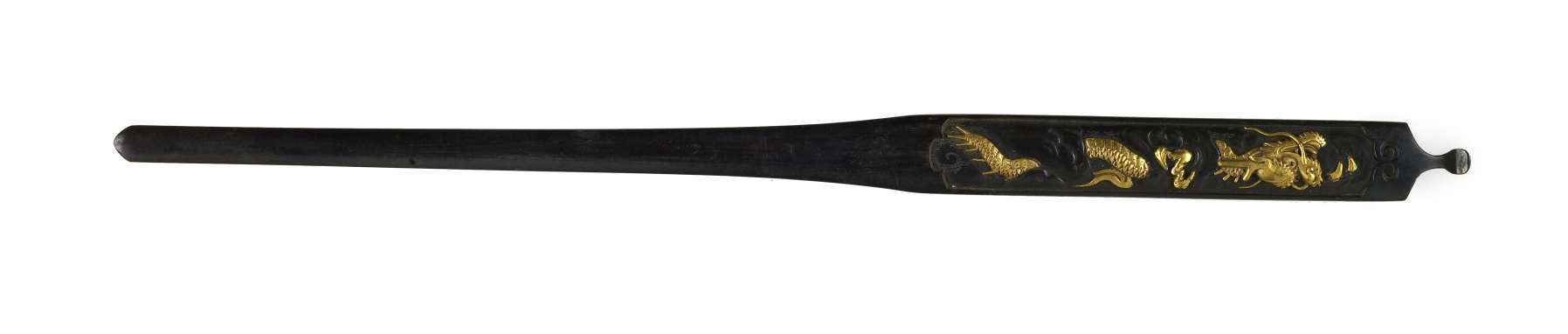
- Umabari

The umabari (馬針) is a small knife that is a variation of the kogatana. It fits into a pocket on the saya.

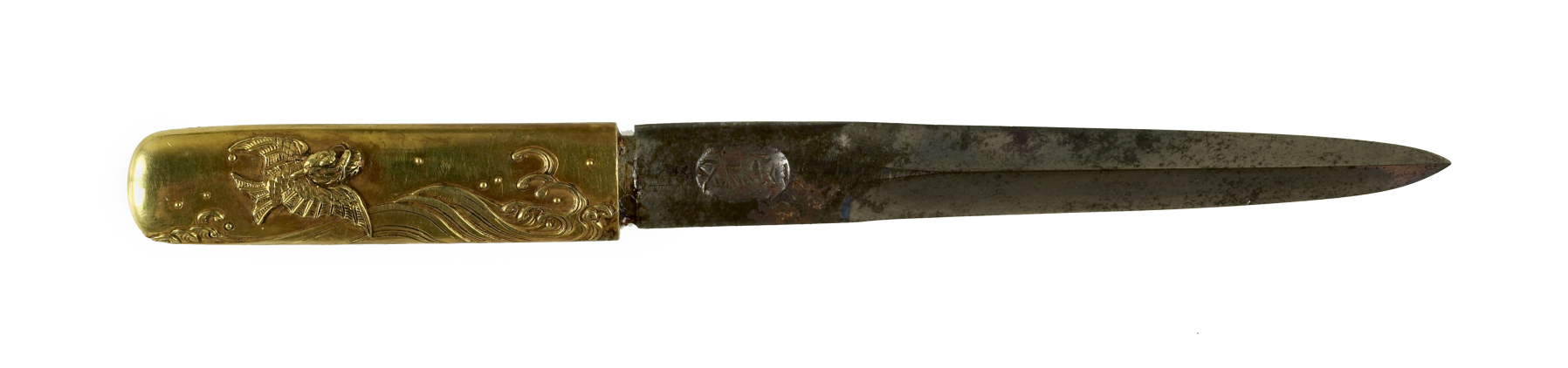

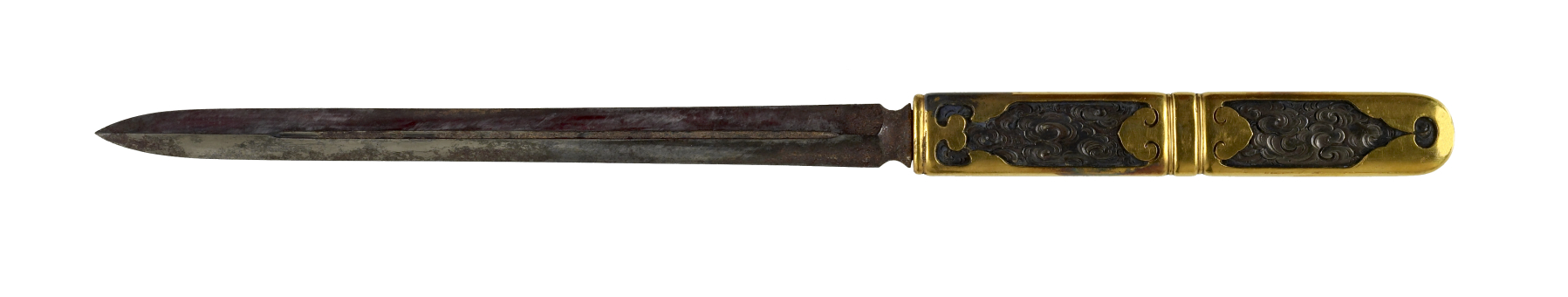

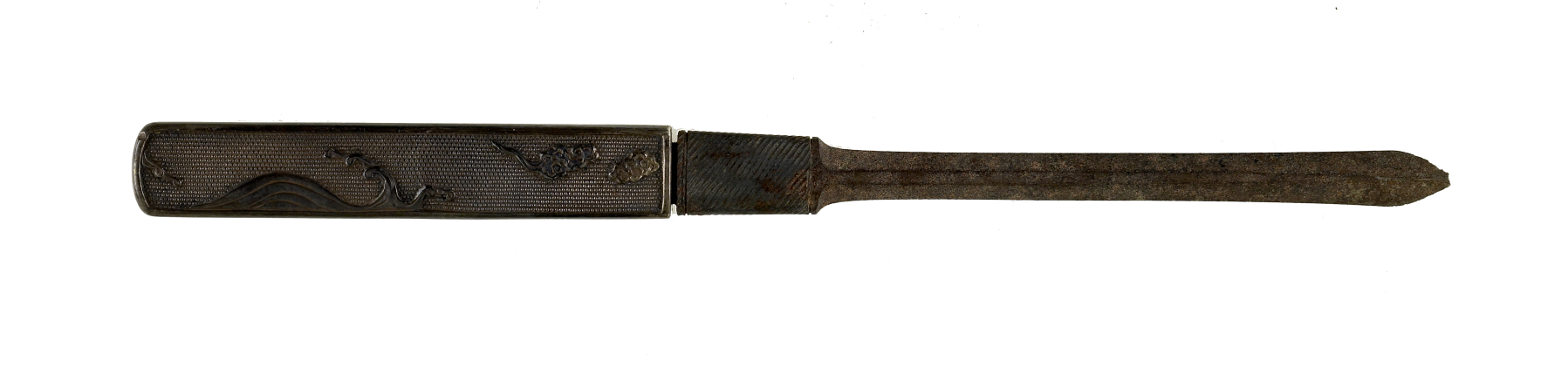

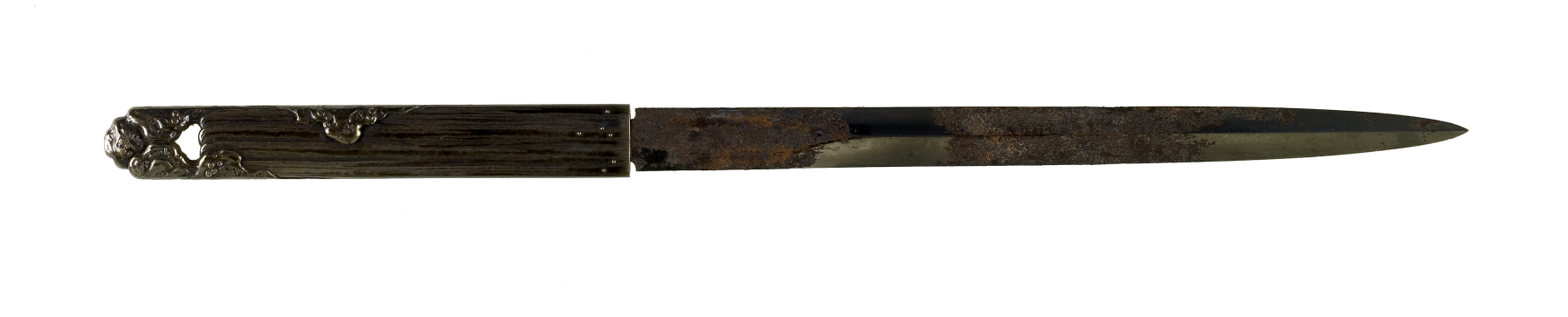

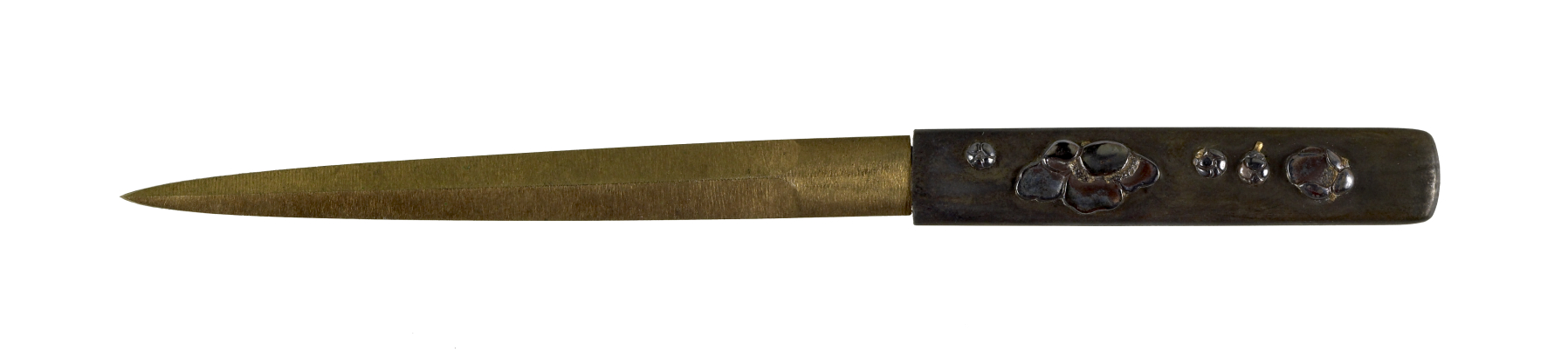

==== Tsuka ====
The tsuka (柄) is the hilt or handle of a Japanese sword.

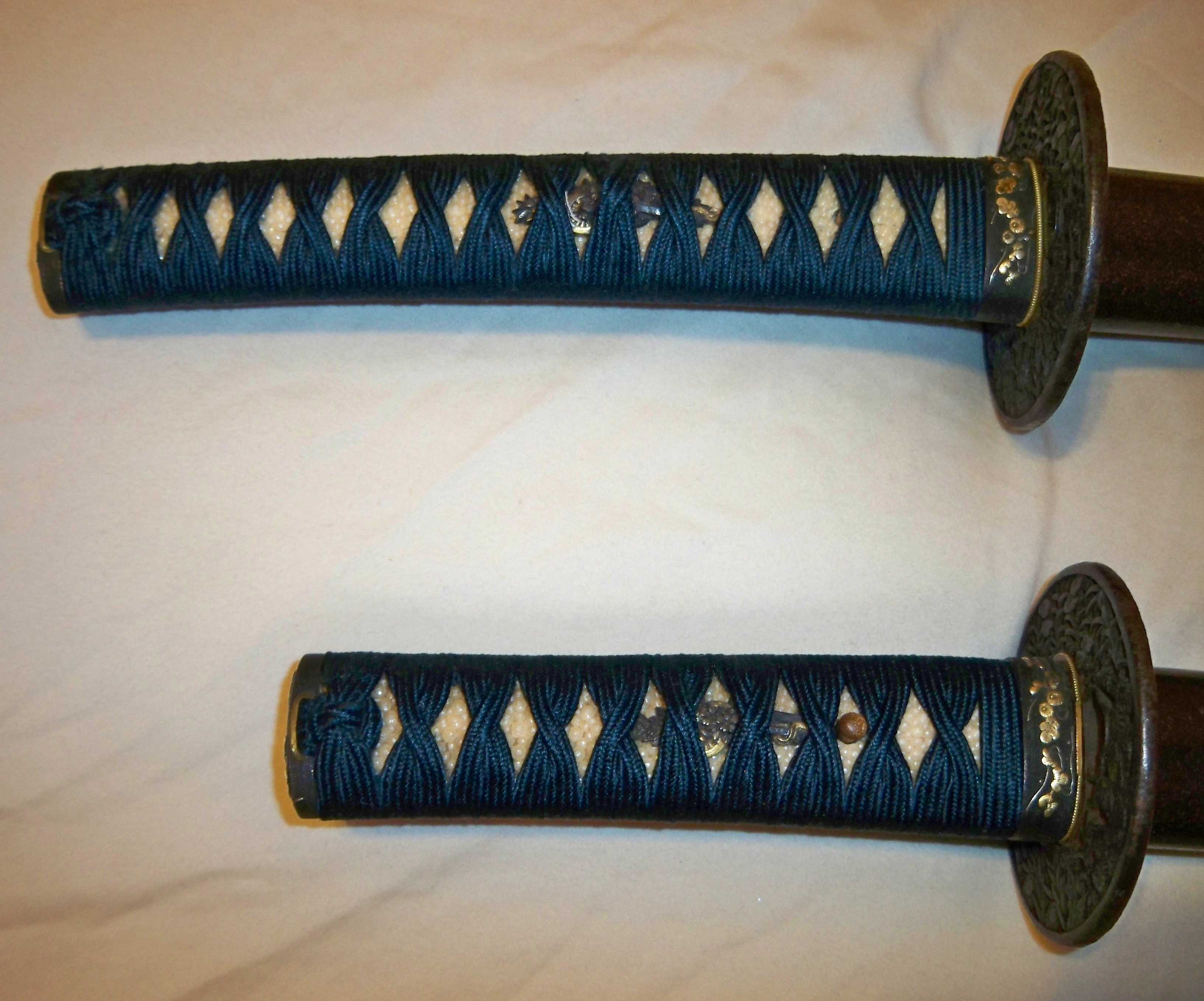
Two tsuka katana (top), wakizashi (bottom) in the form of a daisho (matched set)

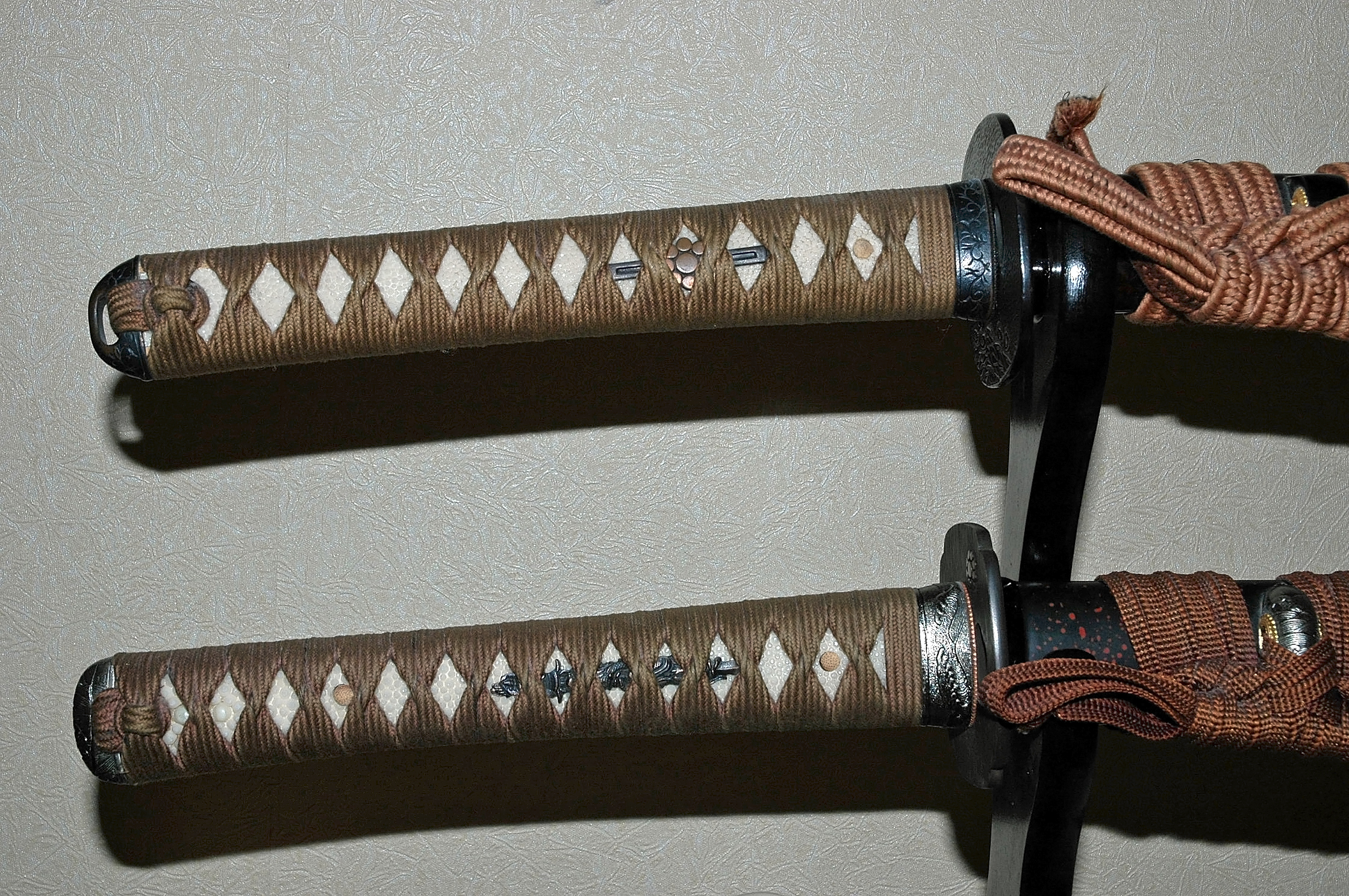
Katana tsuka

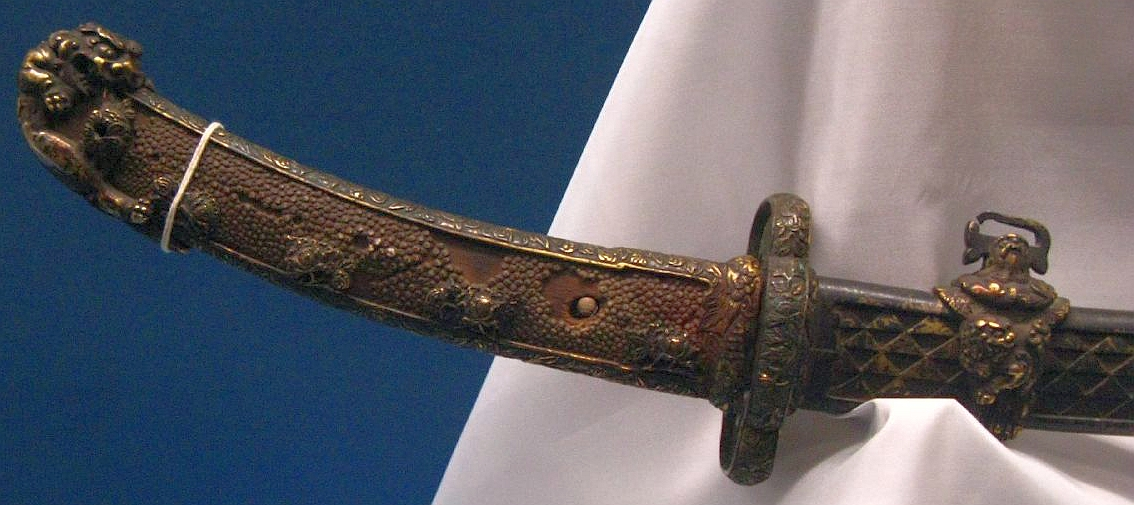
Tachi tsuka

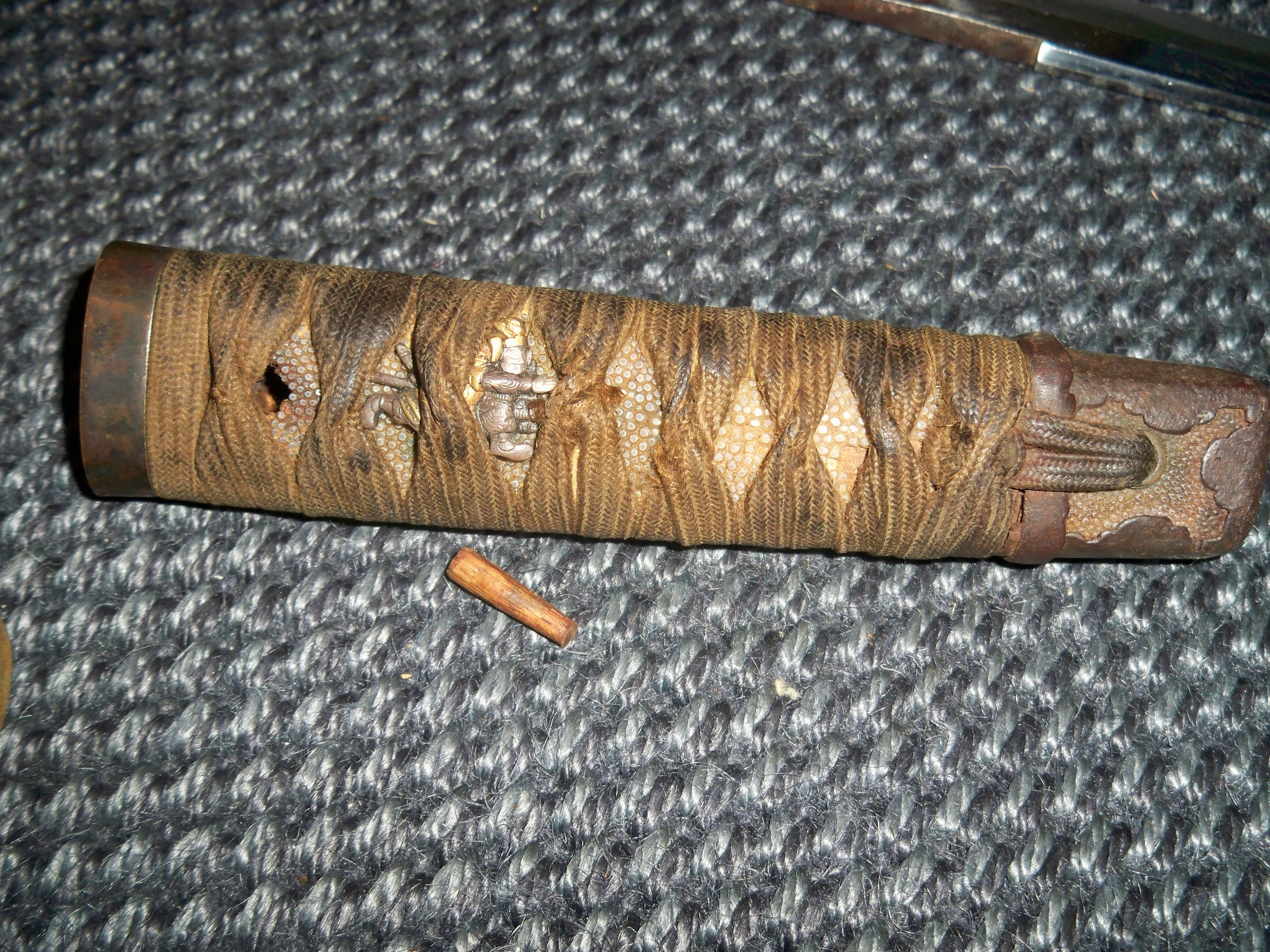
Wakizashi tsuka

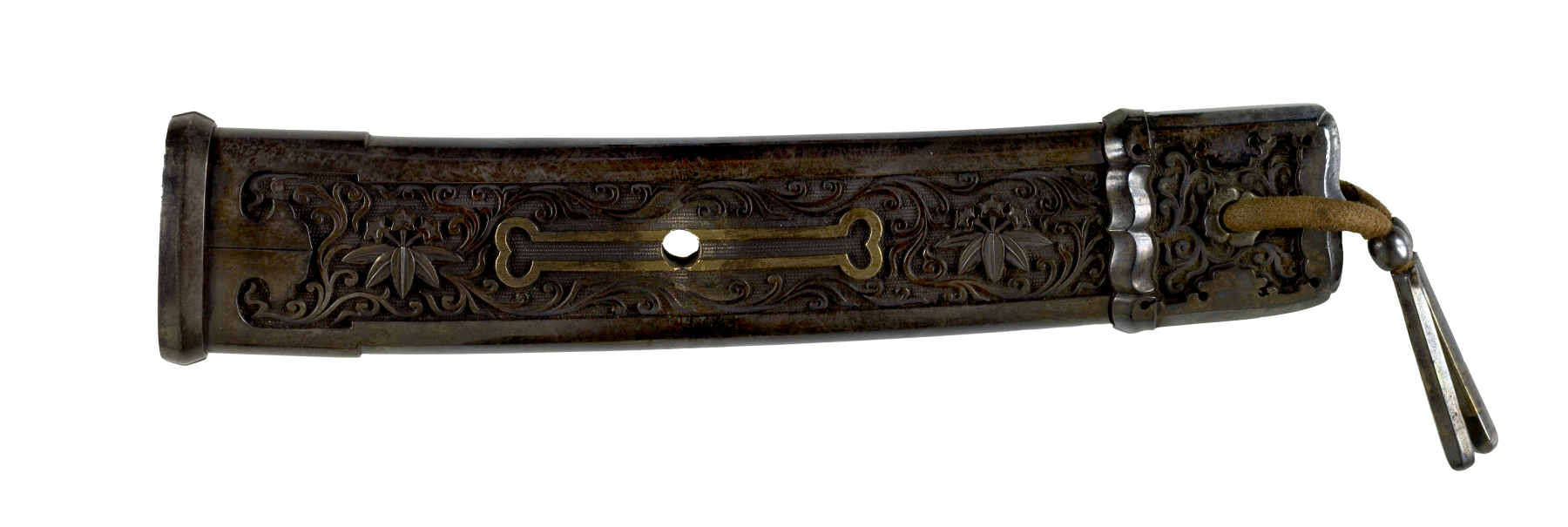
Tsuka constructed as a single piece and does not have individual separate fuchi, kashira, and menuki

The tsuka is divided in the following parts:

- Menuki

The menuki (目貫) are ornaments on the tsuka (generally under the tsuka-ito); to fit into the palm for grip.

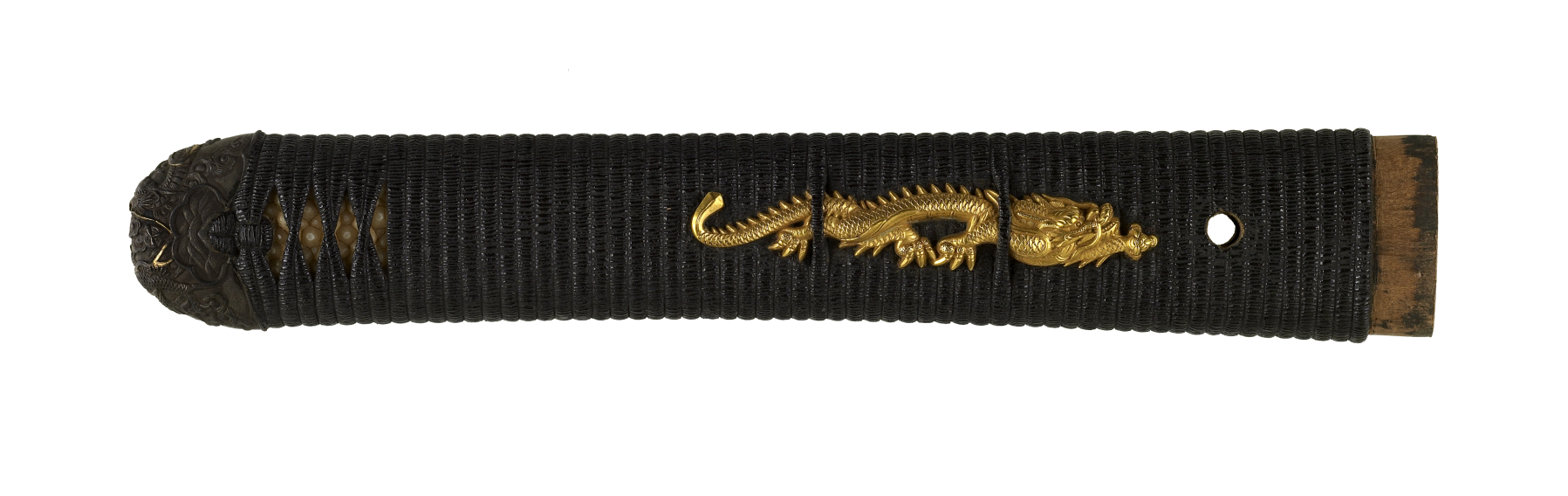

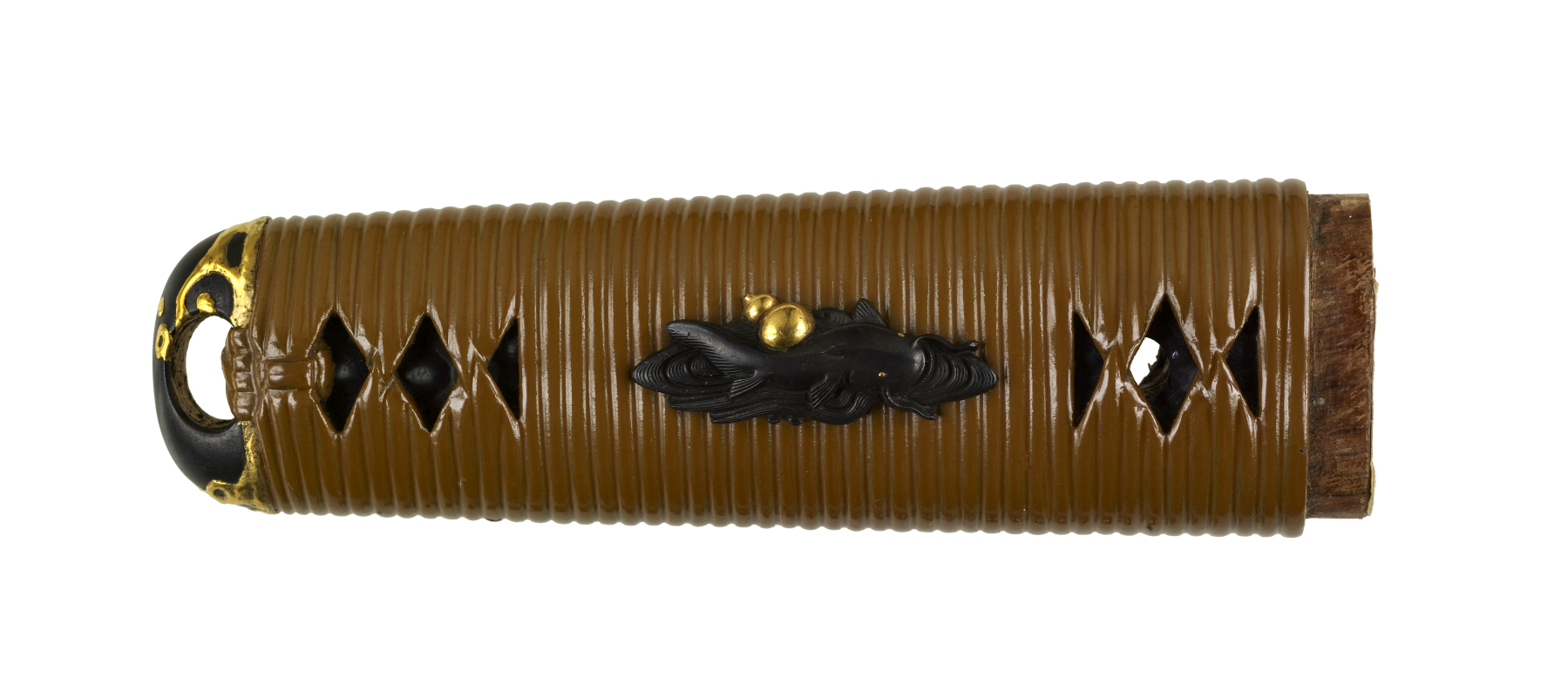

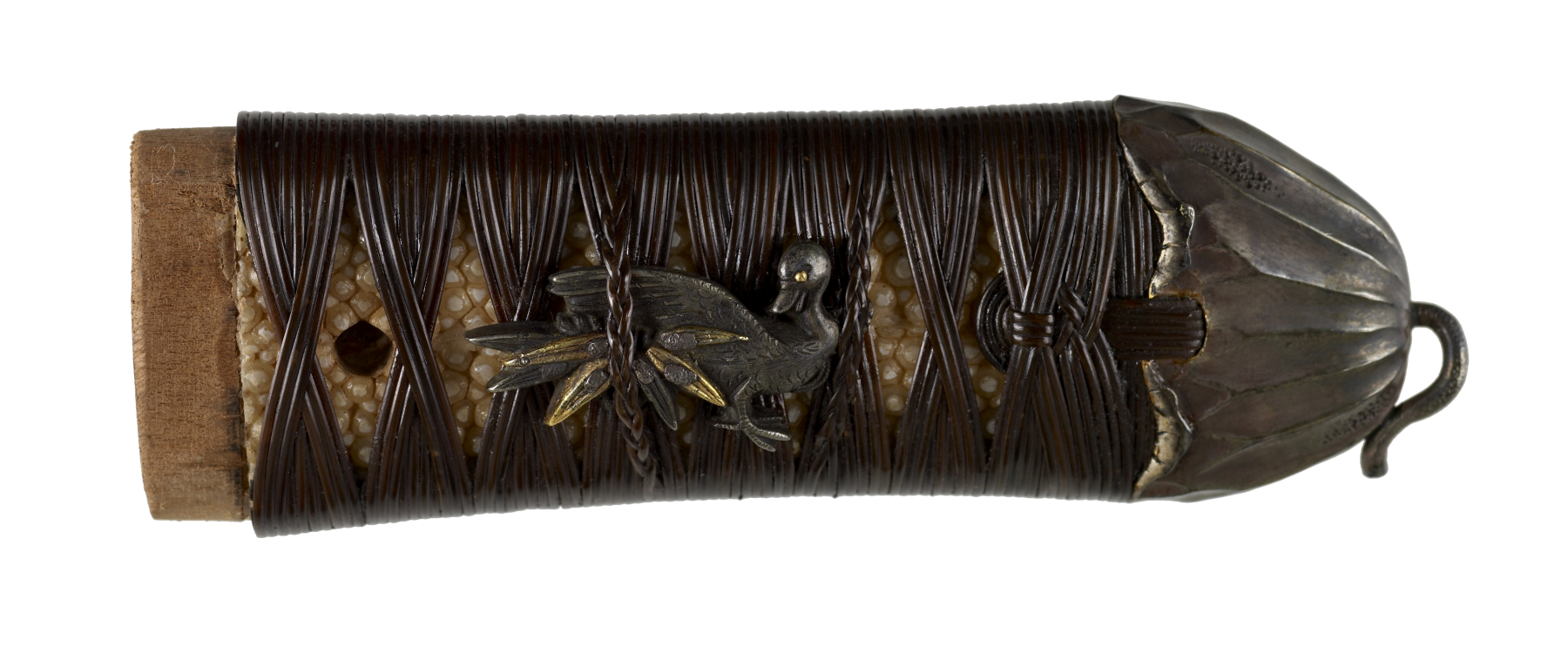
Tsuka with a menuki in the shape of standing goose with bamboo

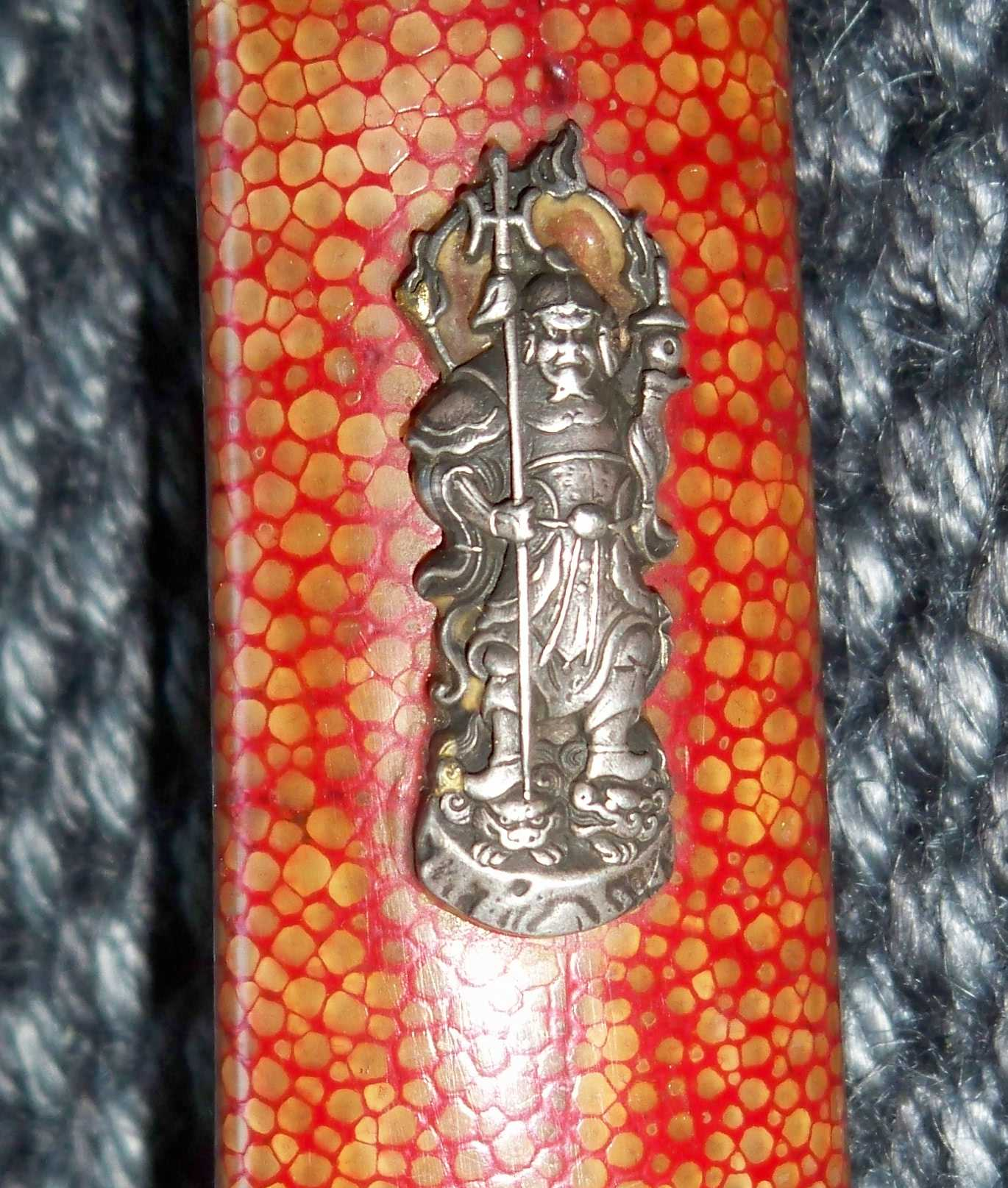

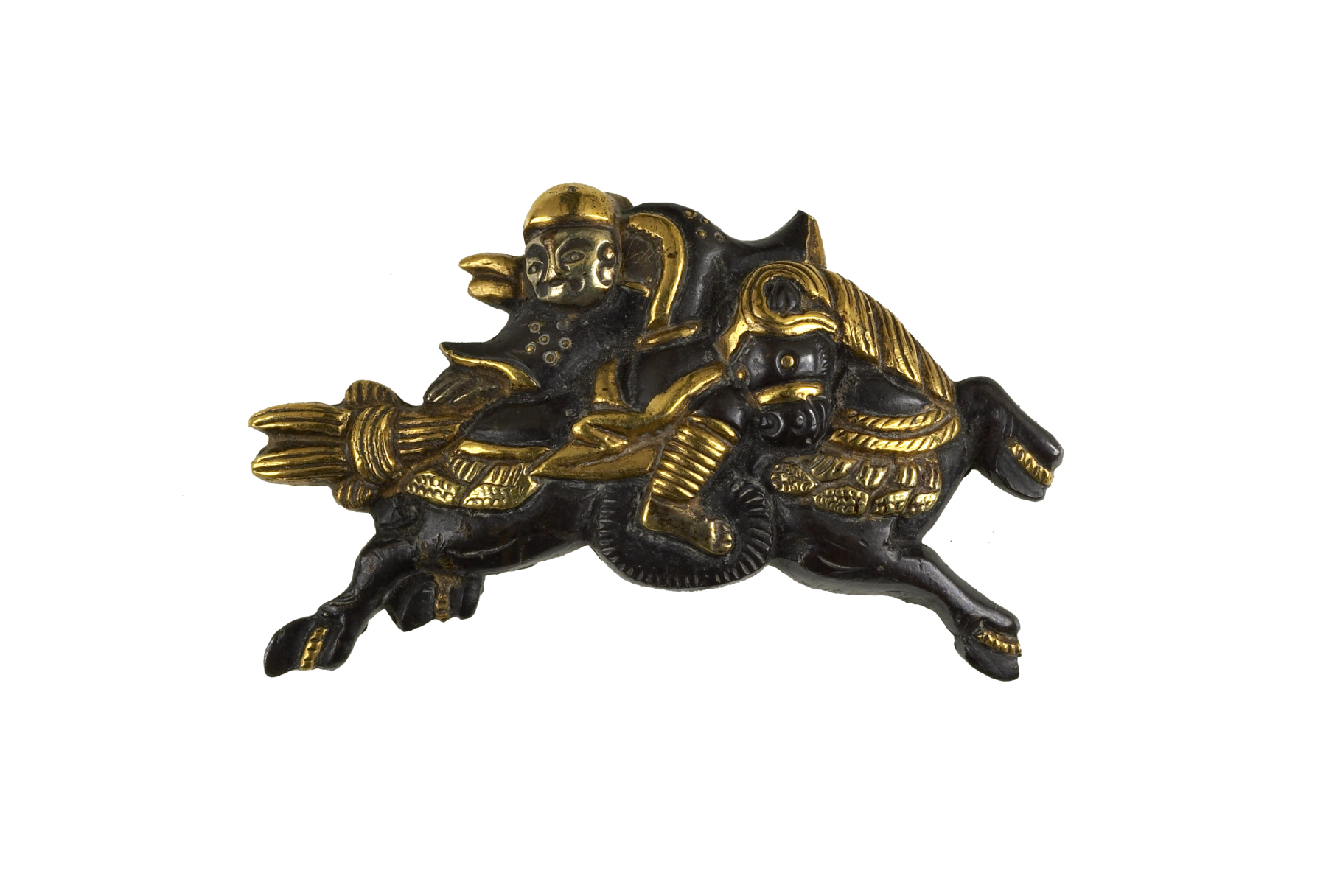
Menuki with horse and rider
- Samegawa

Samegawa (鮫皮) is the ray skin used to cover or wrap the handle.

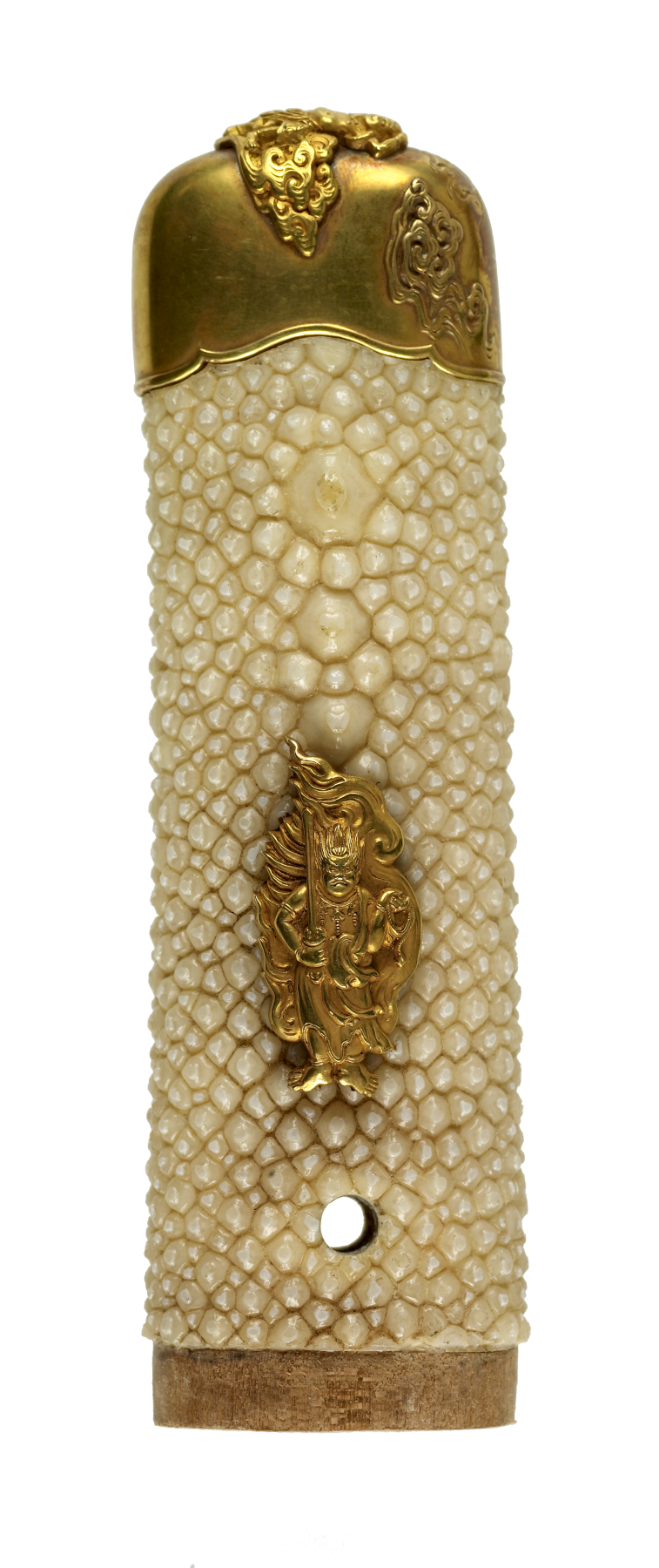

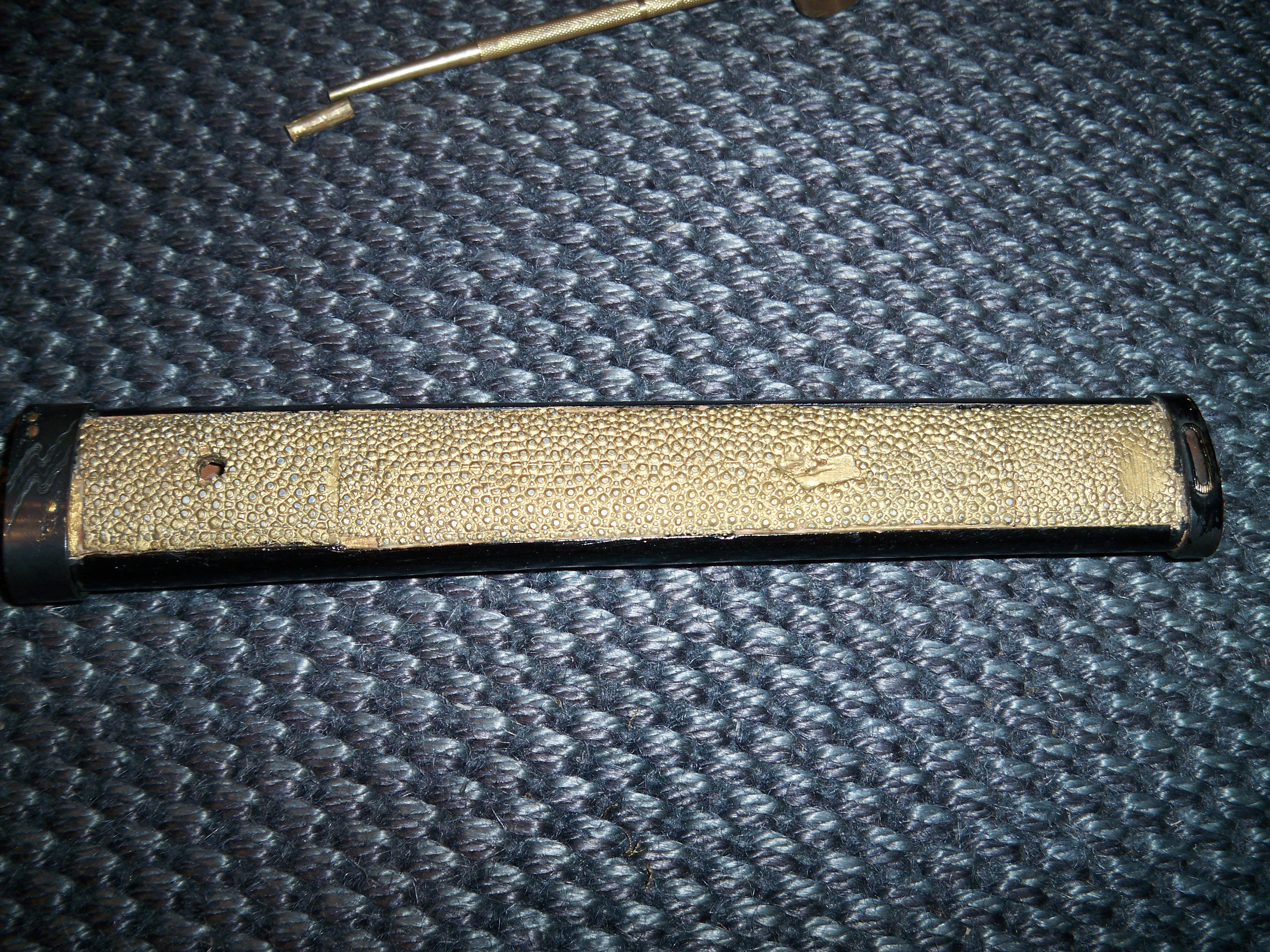
Tsuka showing the samegawa

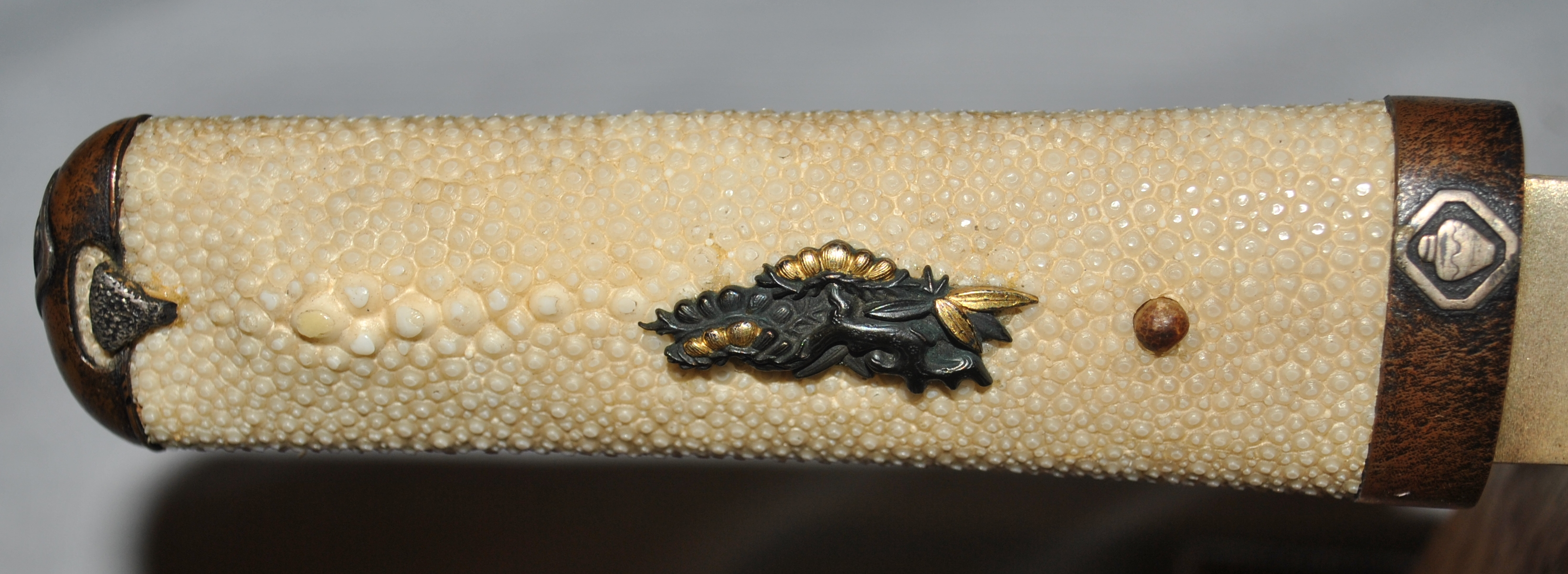
Tanto tsuka showing the samegawa

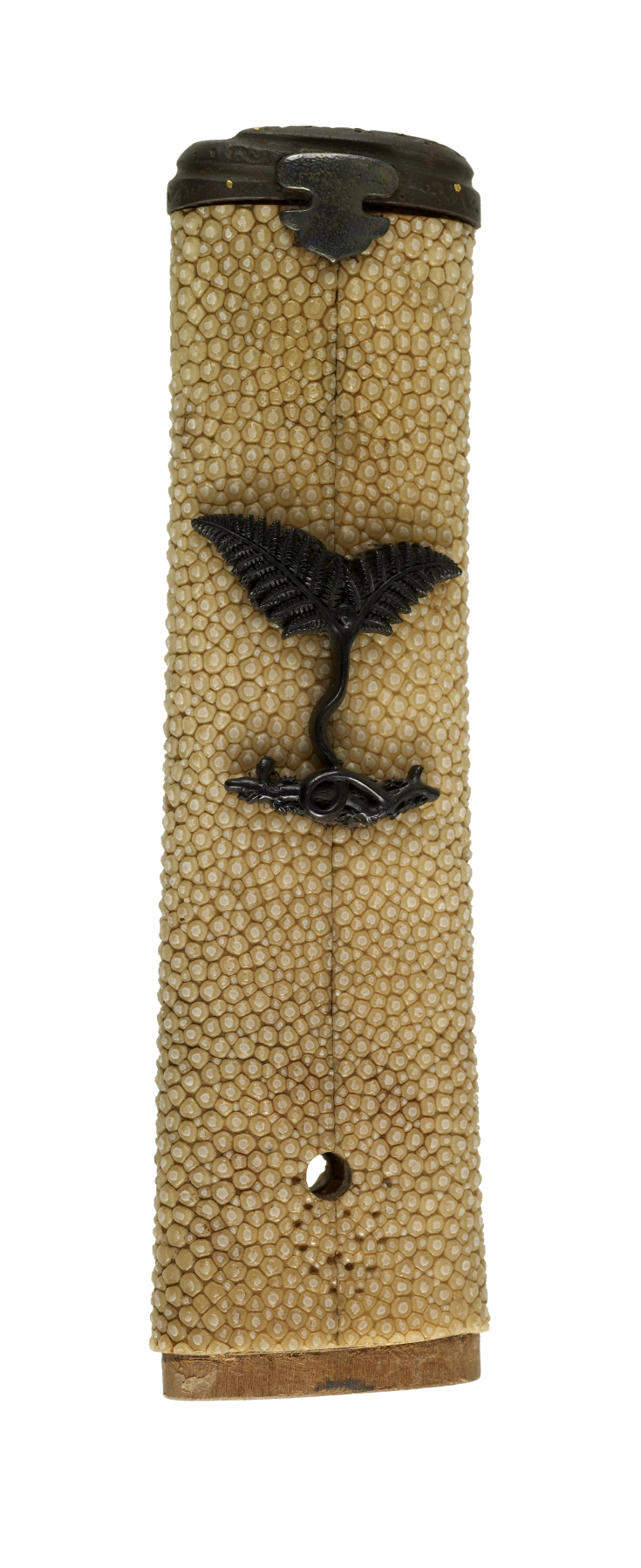

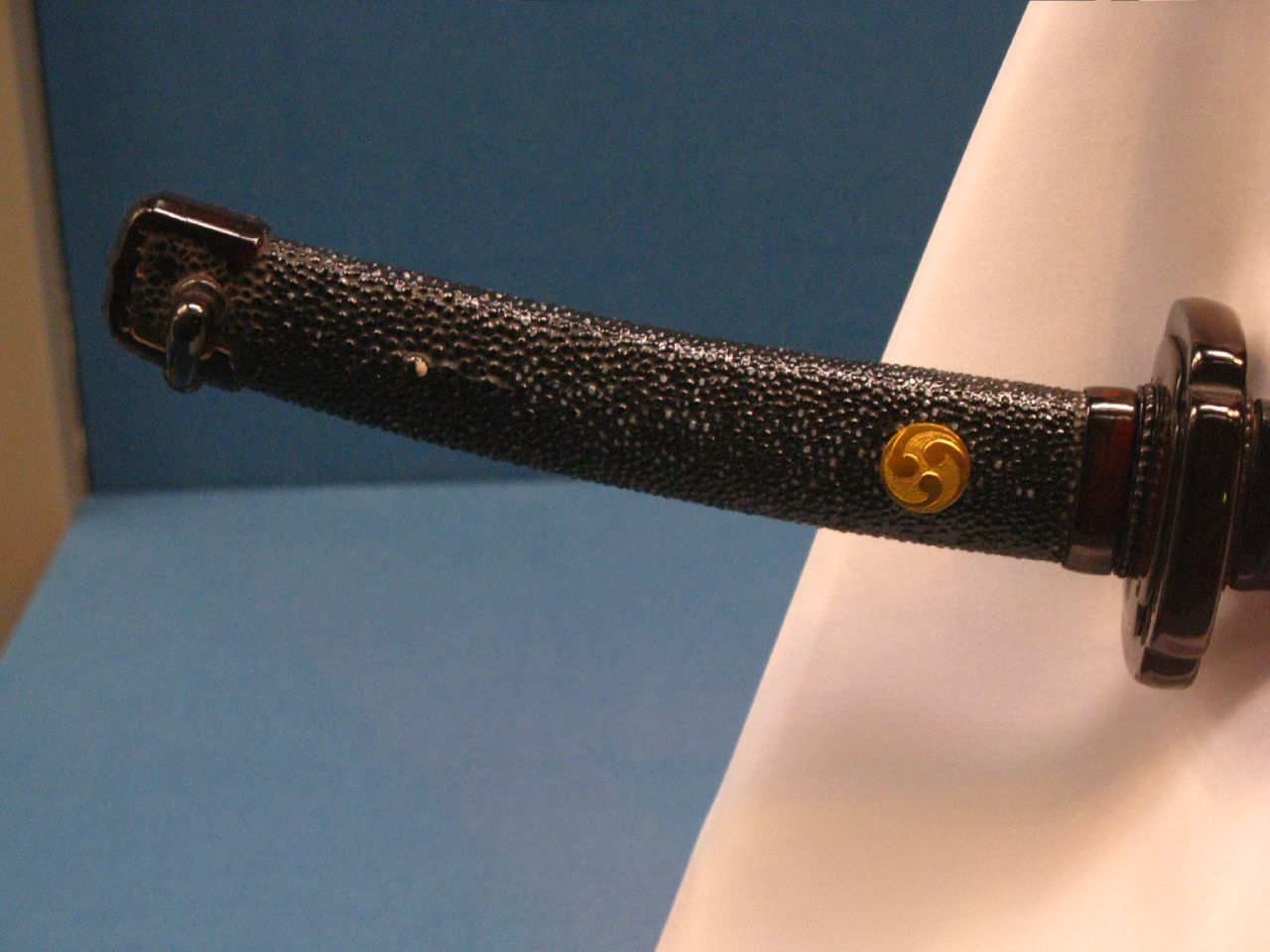
- Tsuka-ito

Tsuka-ito (柄糸) is the wrapping of the tsuka, traditionally silk but today more often cotton and sometimes, leather.

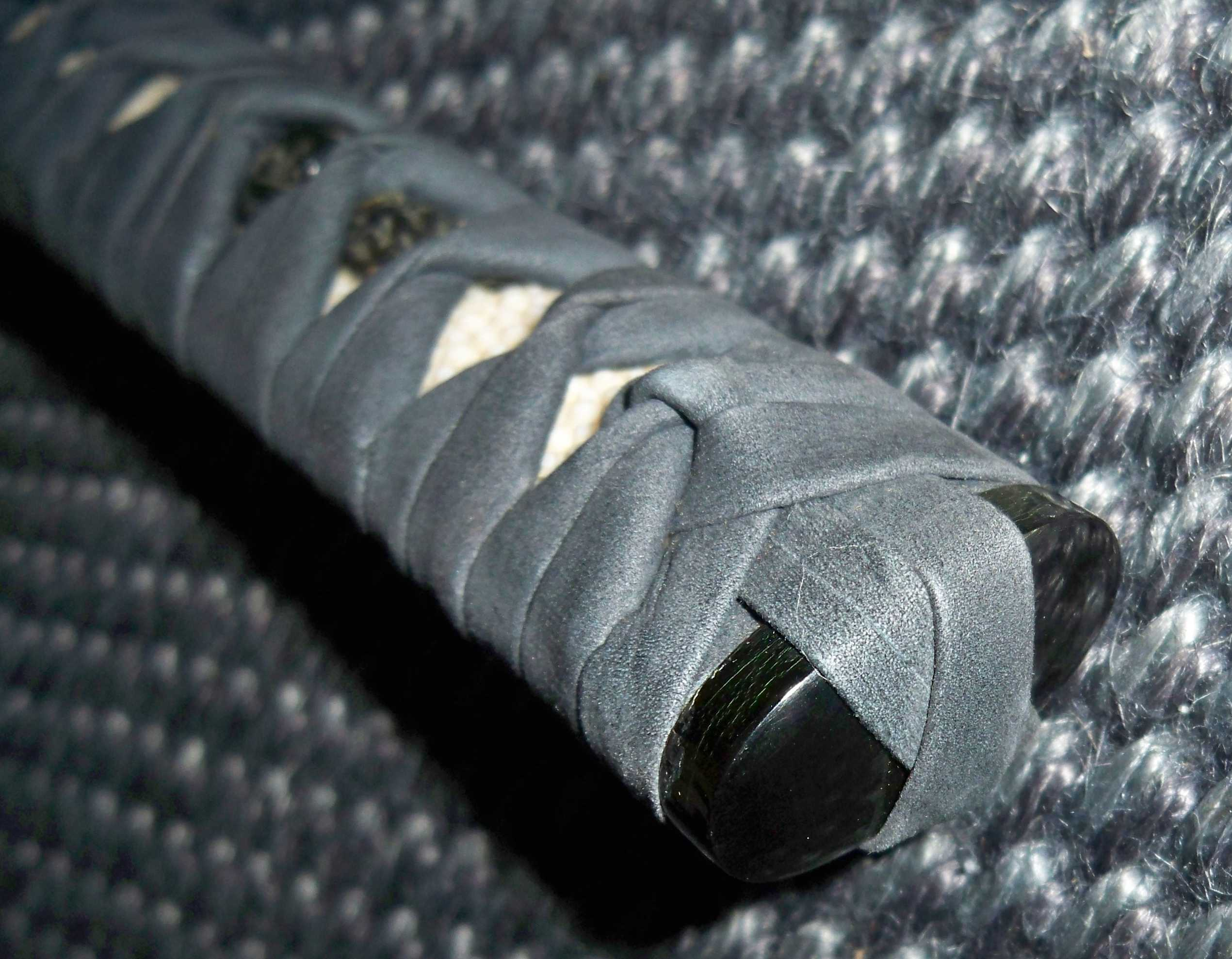

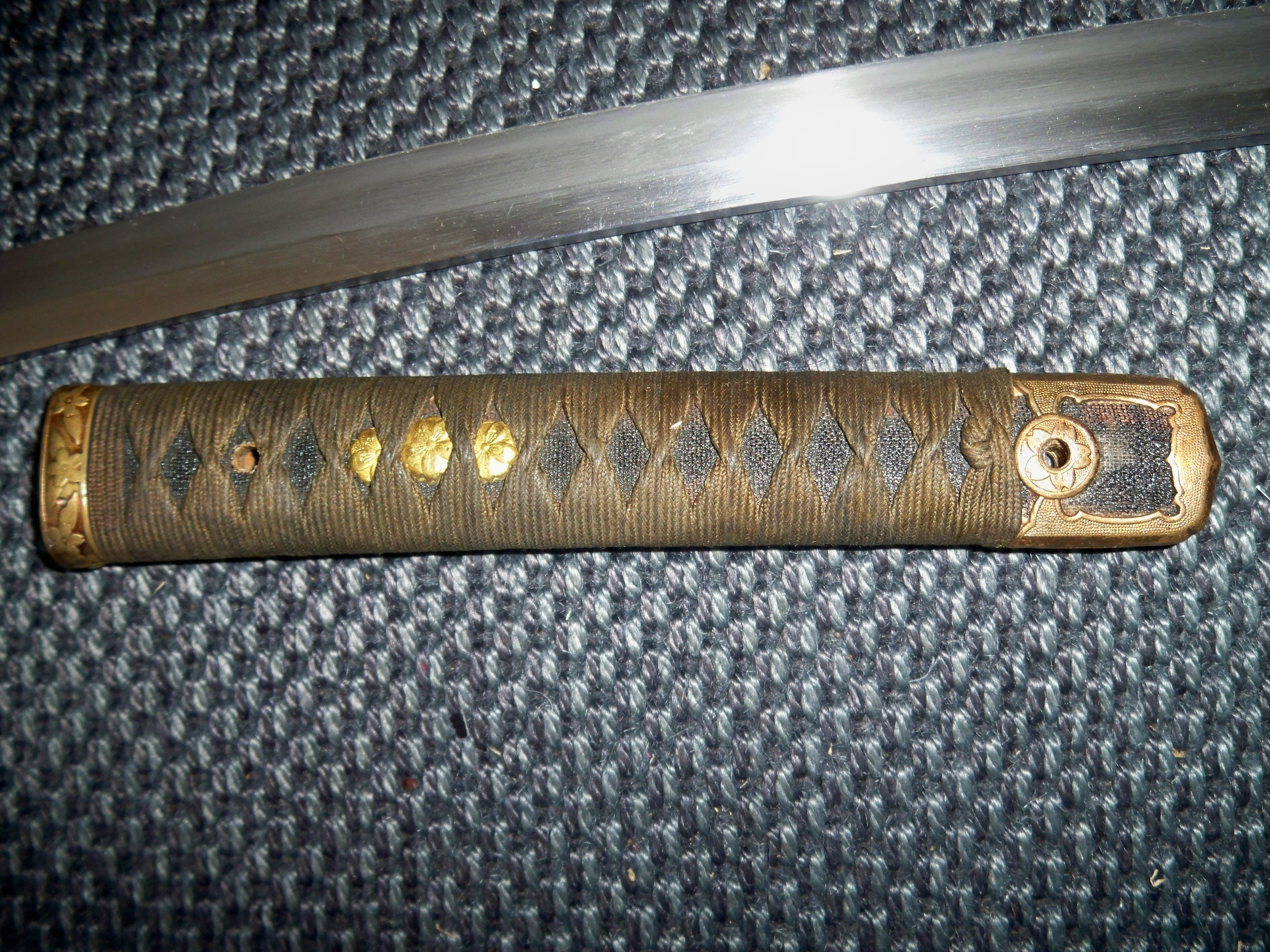

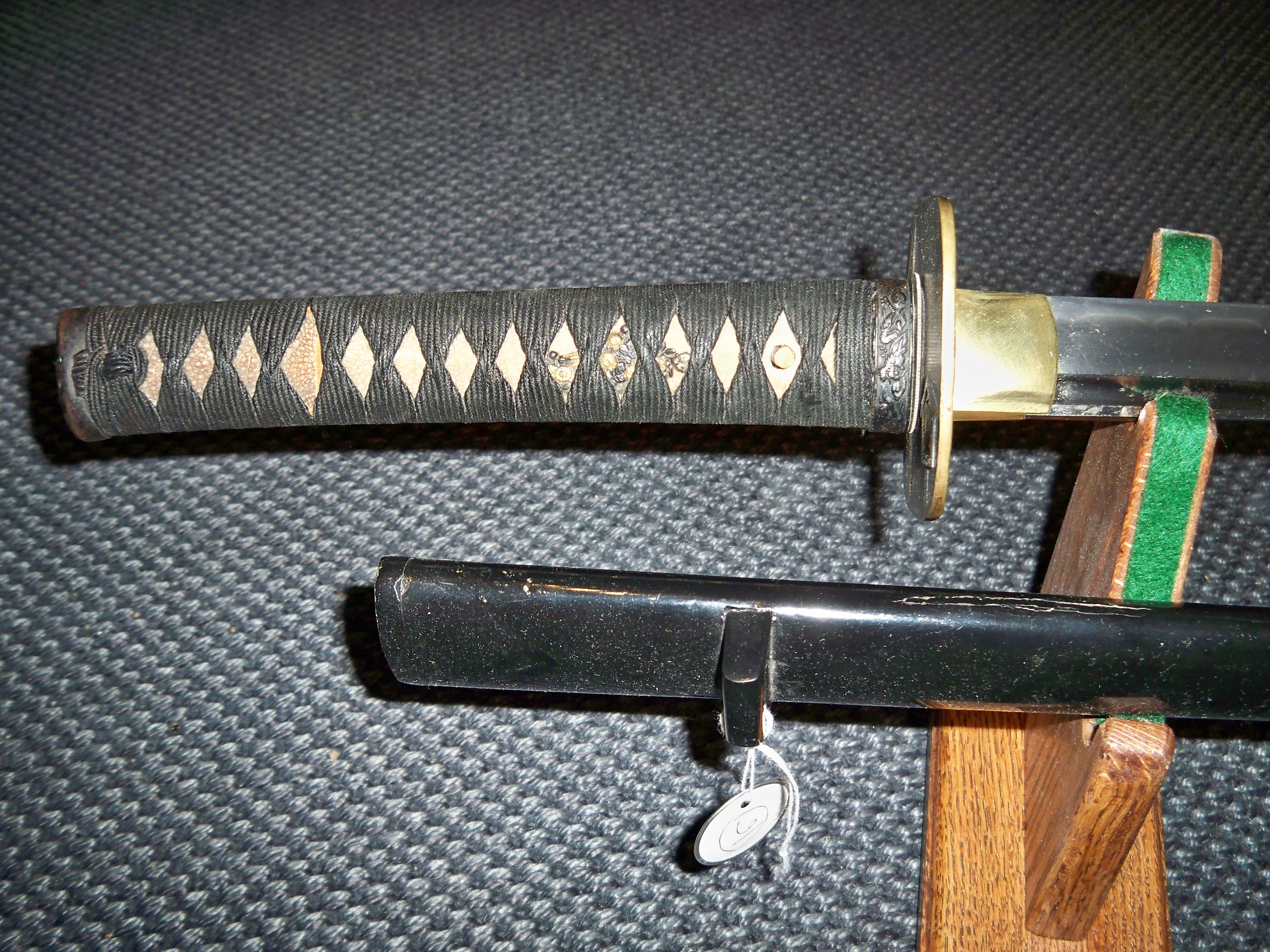

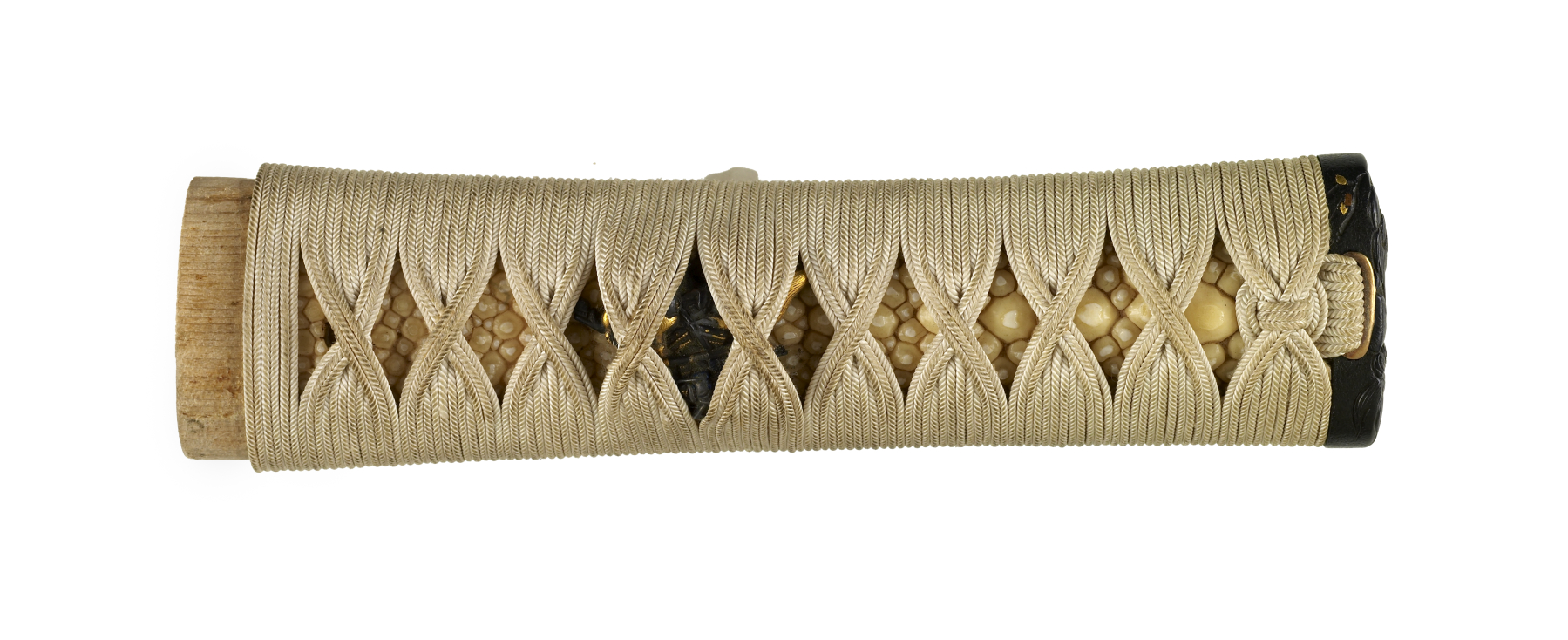

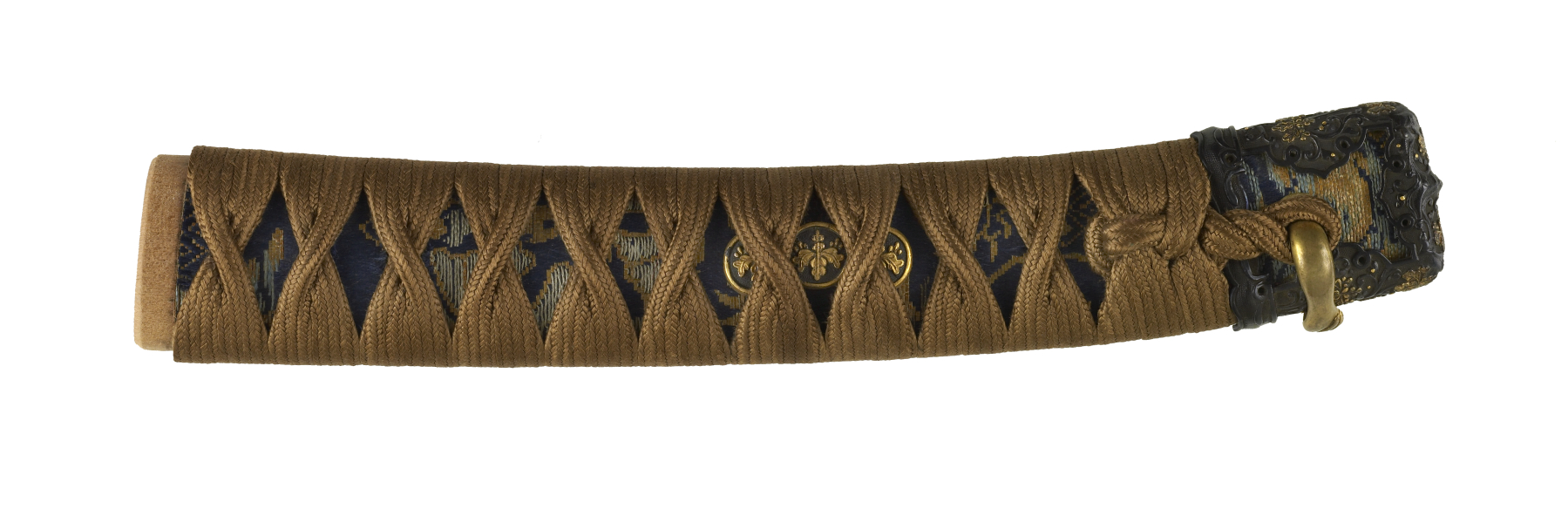
- Fuchi

Fuchi (縁), a cap type collar or ferrule which covers the opening in the tsuka of a Japanese sword. The tang of the sword goes into the tsuka through the opening in the fuchi.

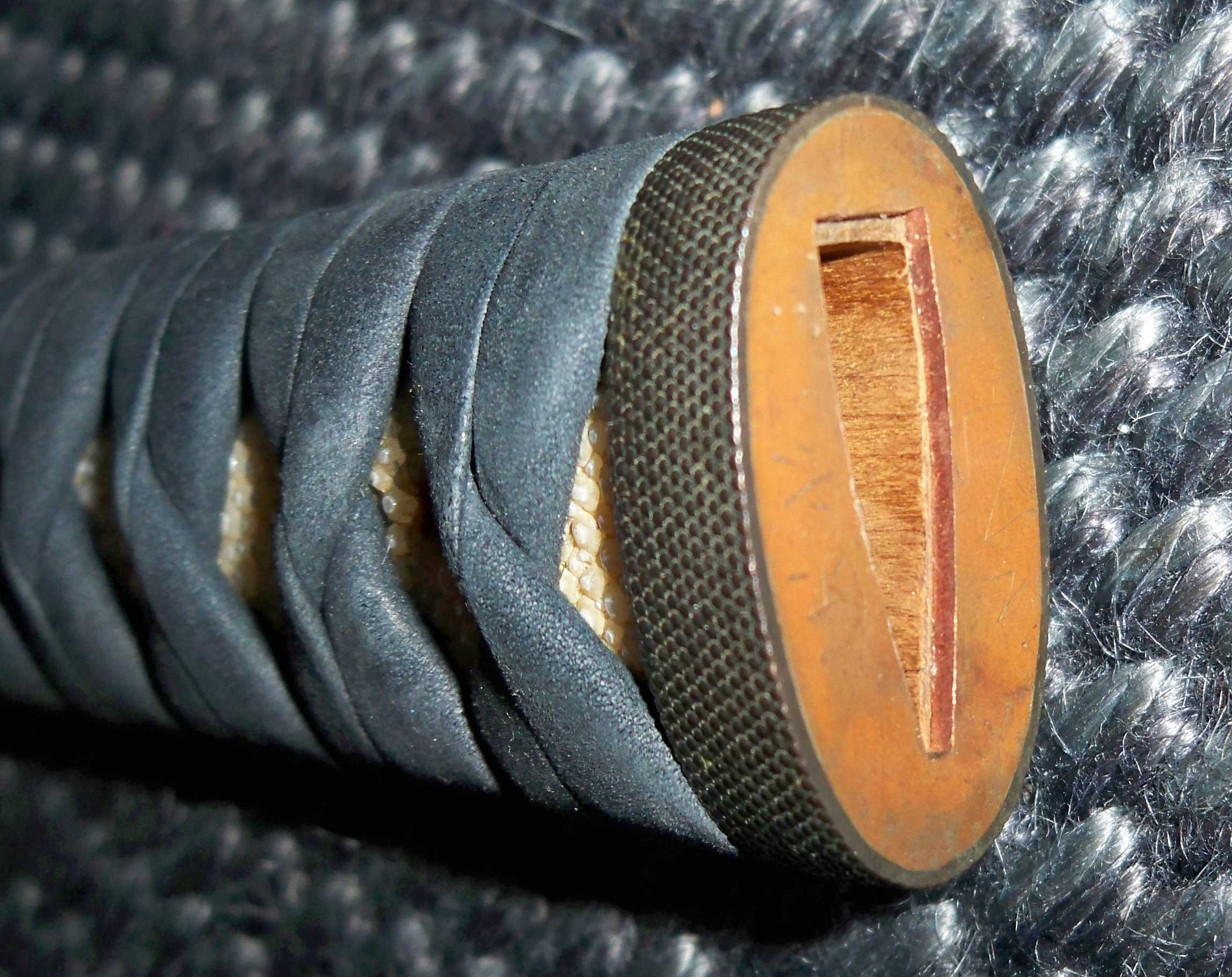
Katana fuchi

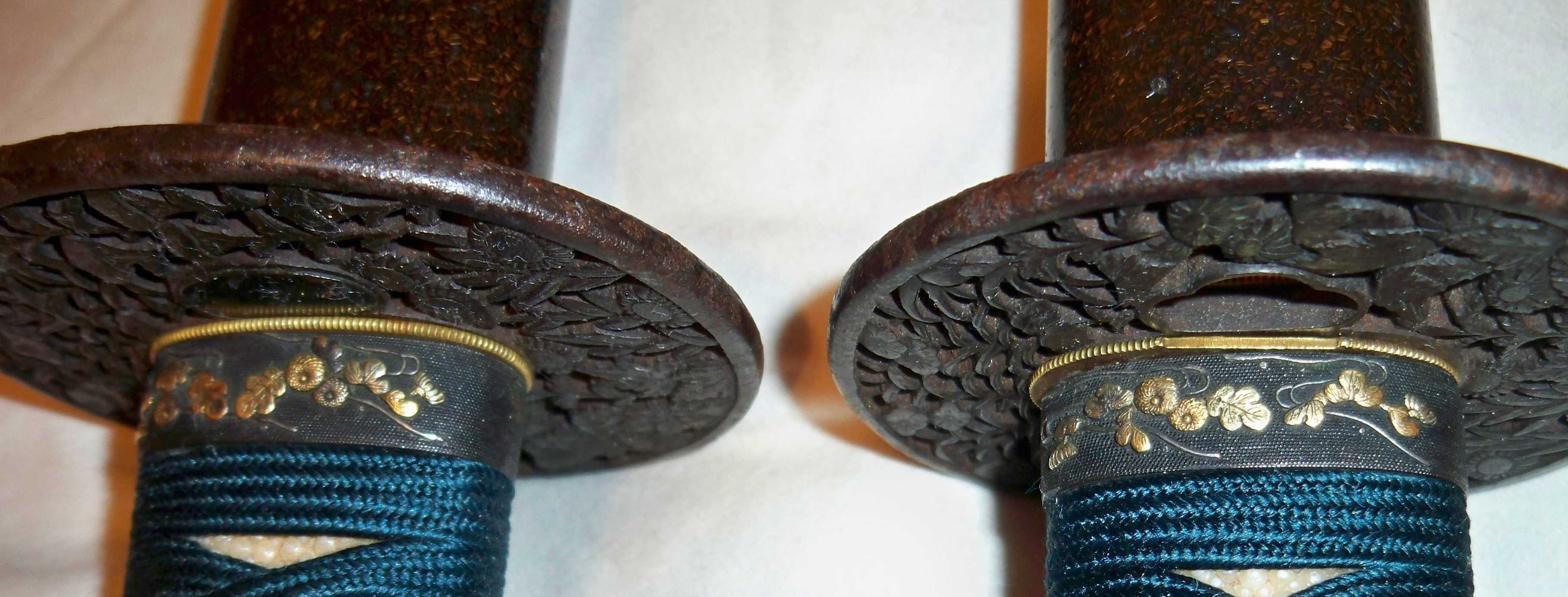
A daisho pair of fuchi

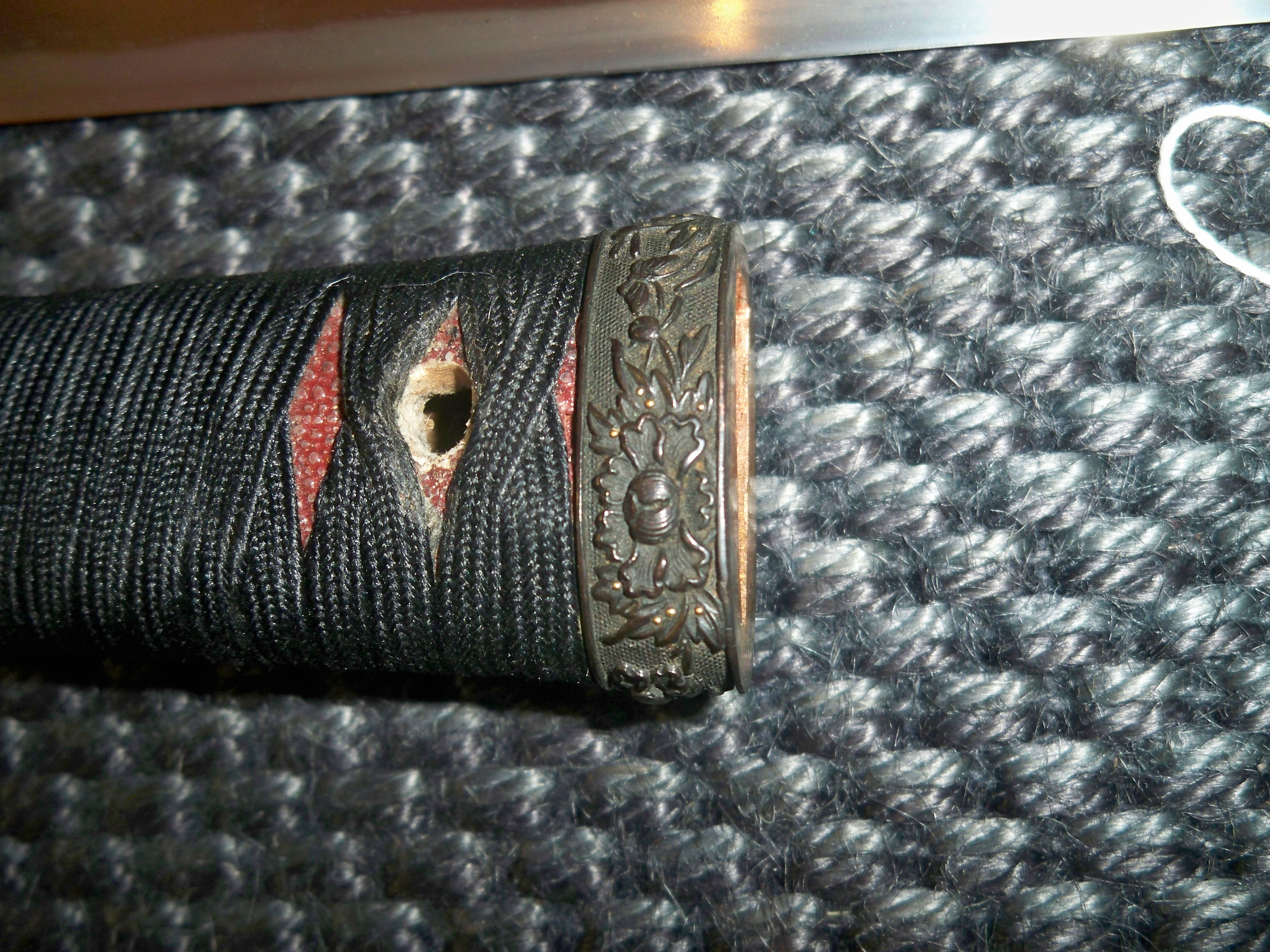

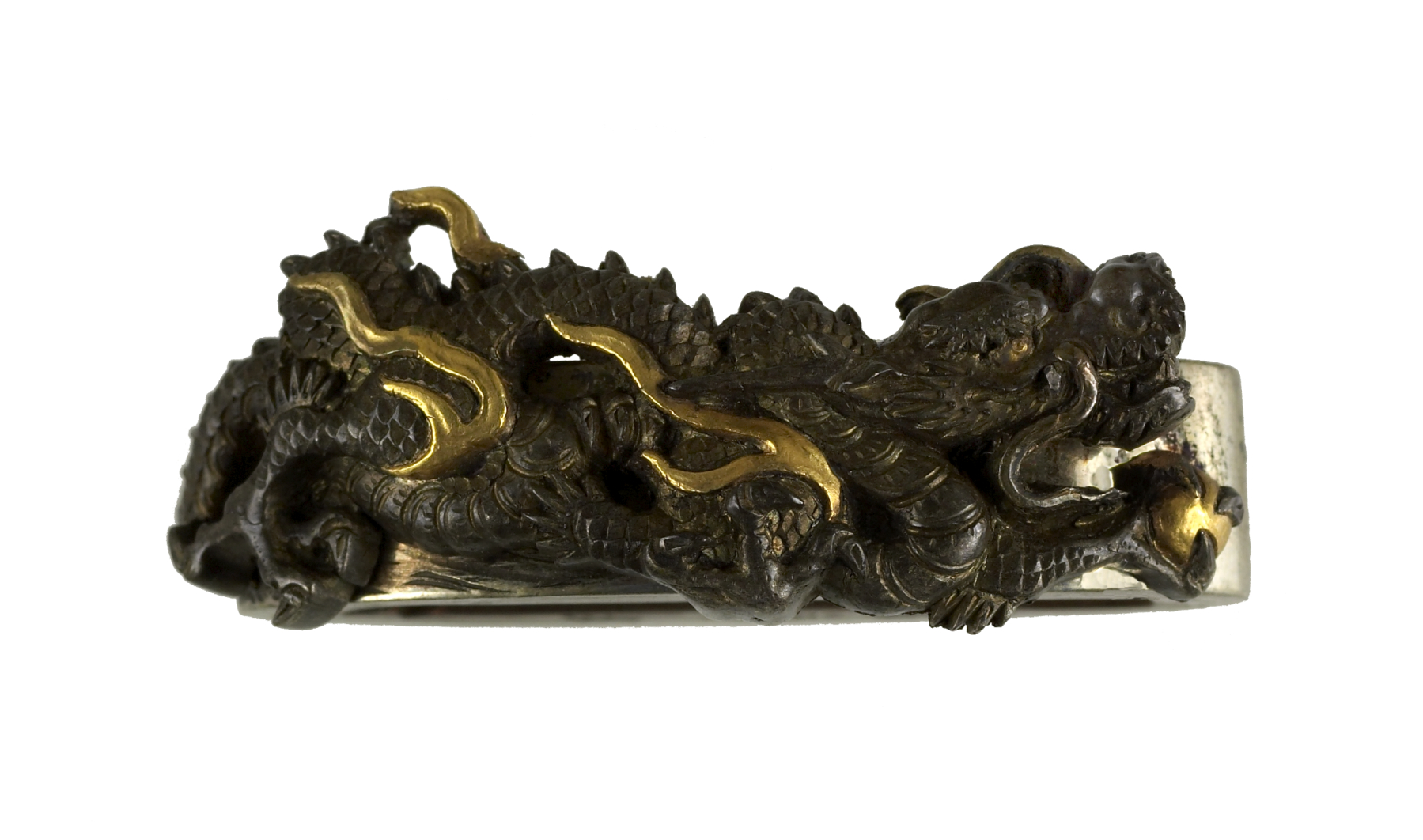
Fuchi with dragon

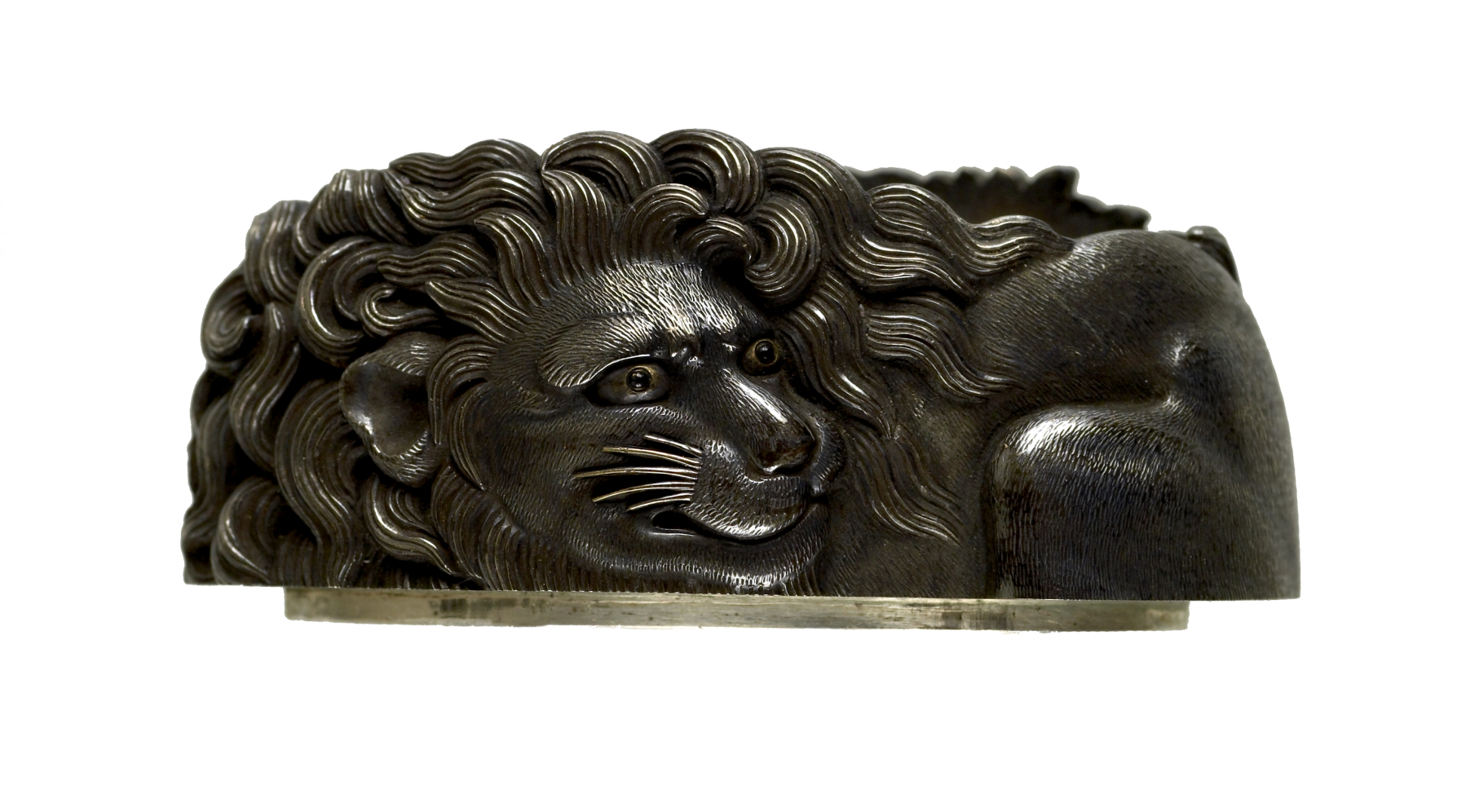
Fuchi with crouching lions
- Kashira

The kashira (頭) is the end cap (pommel) on the tsuka.

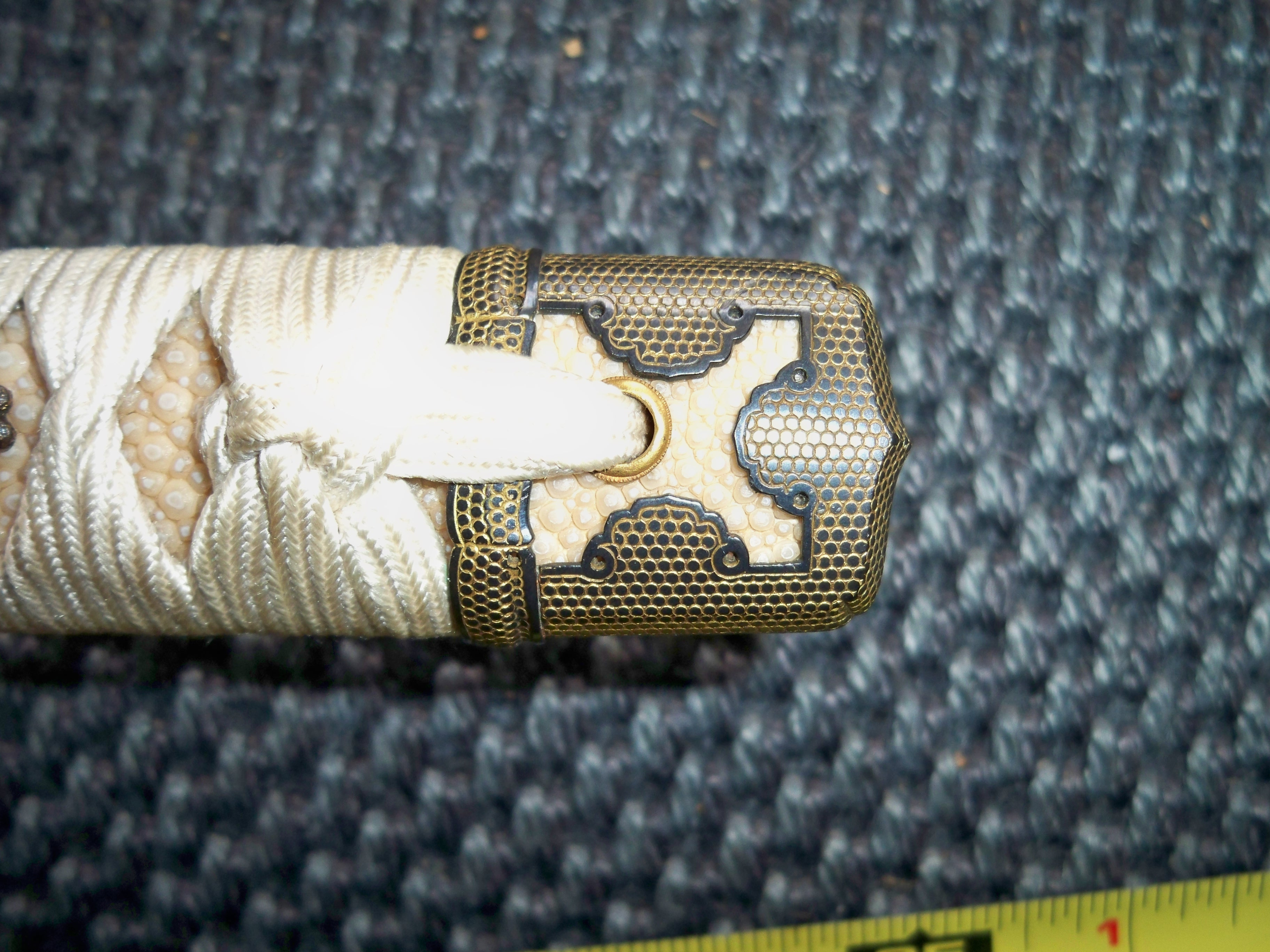
Katana kashira

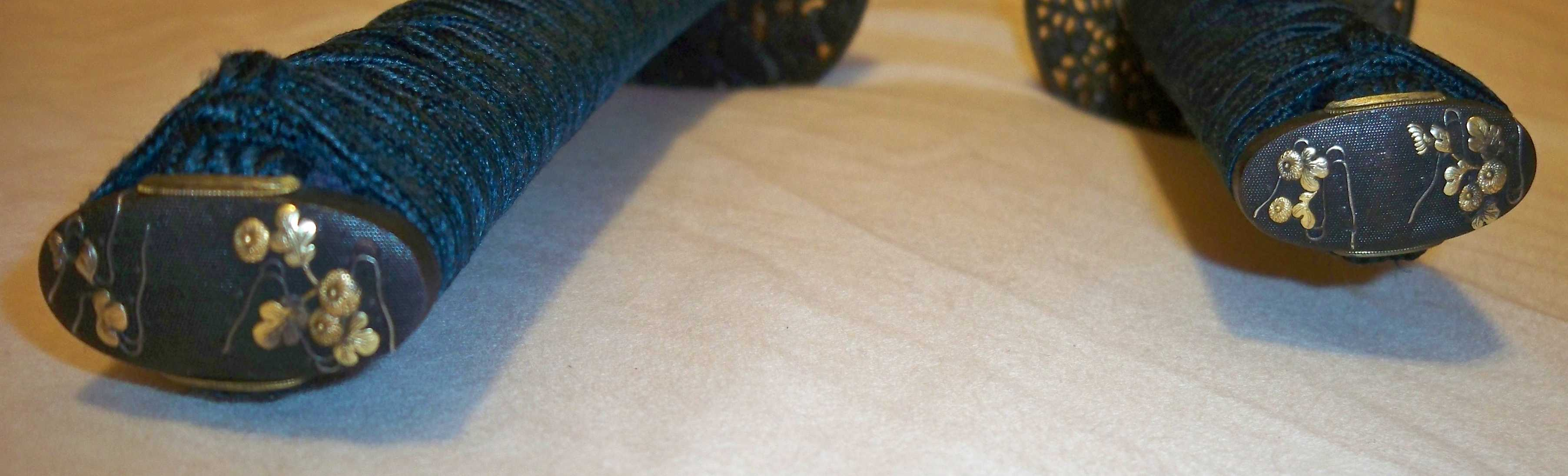
Daisho kashira, wakizashi and katana

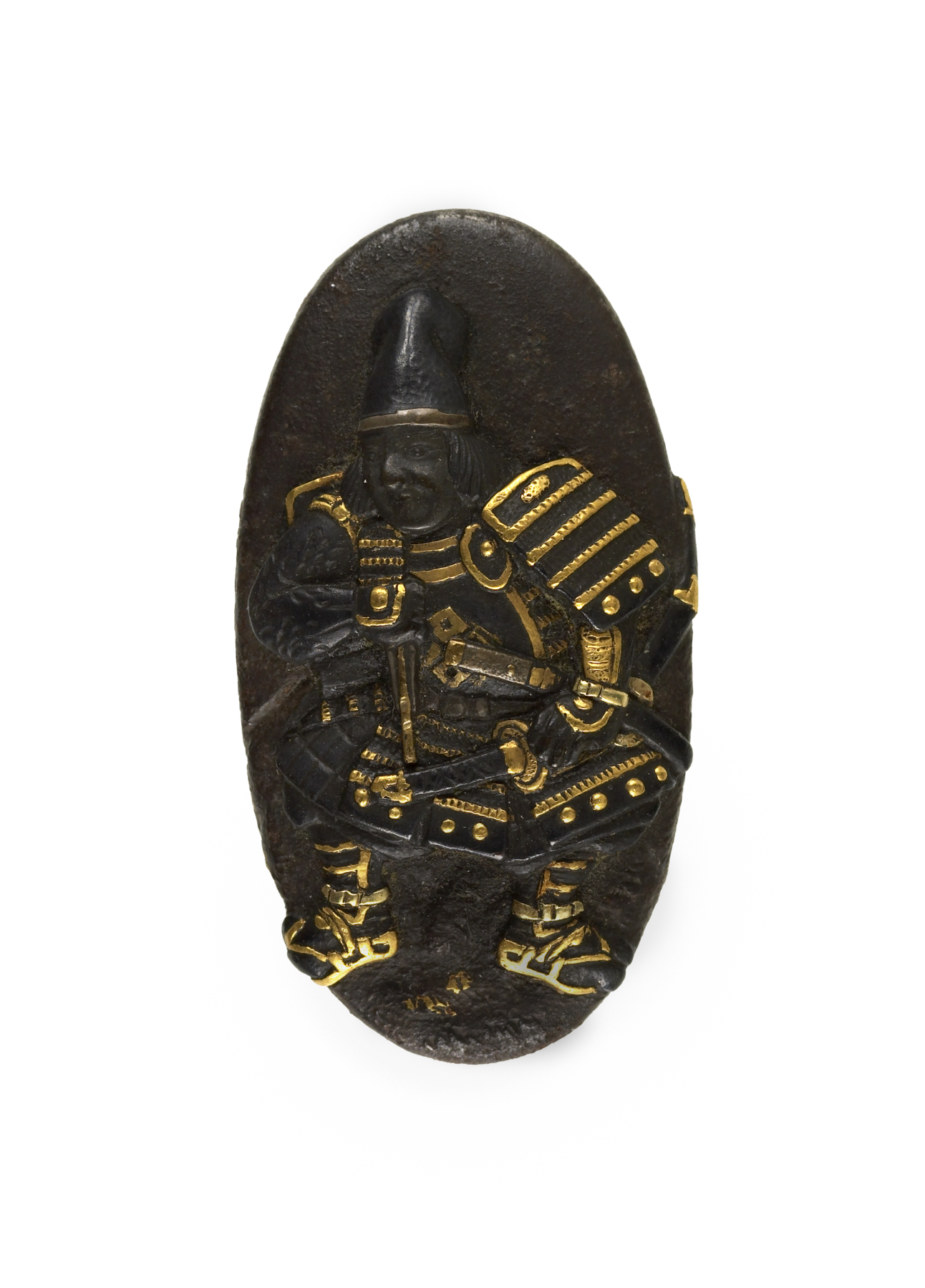
Kashira with samurai

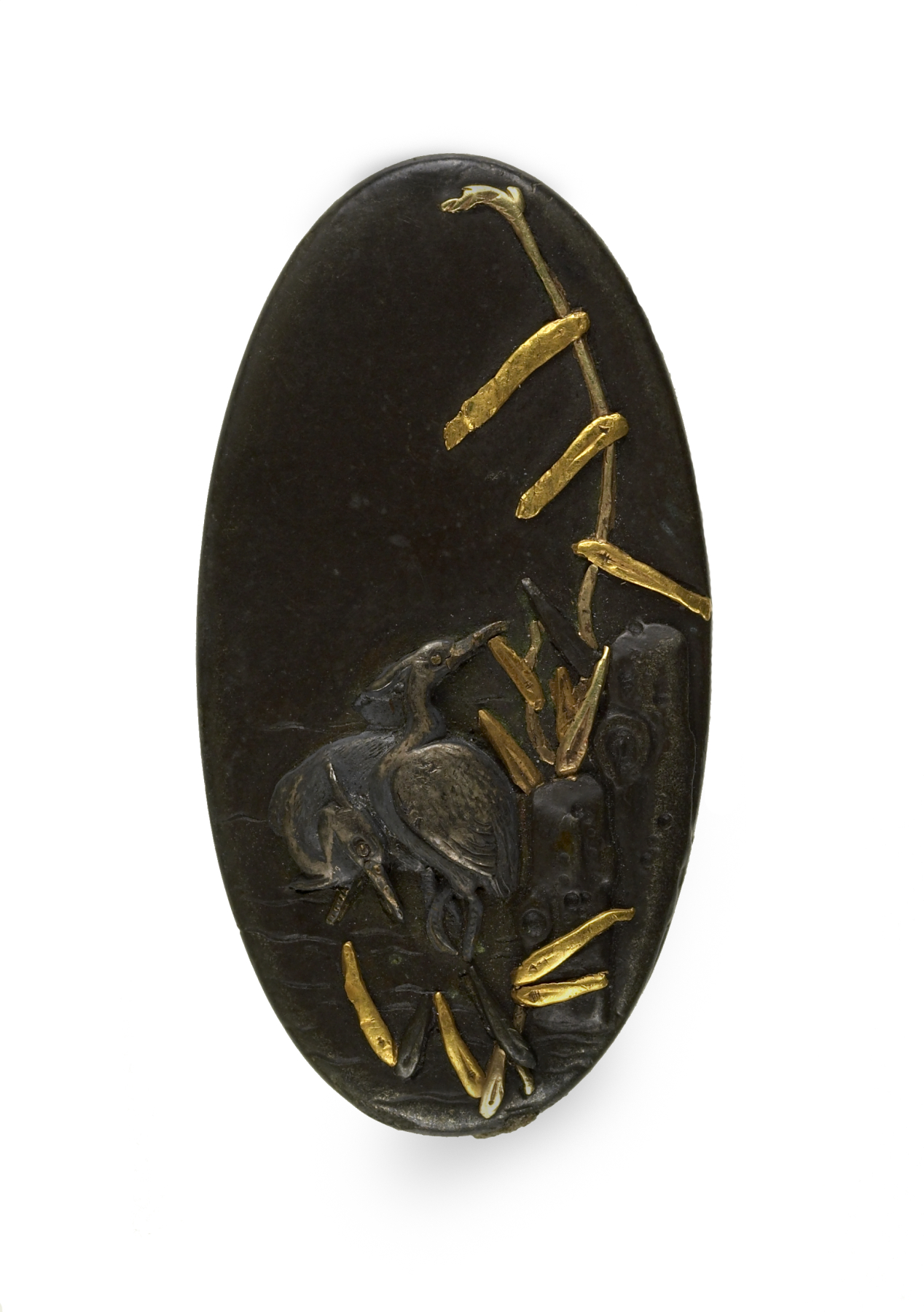
Kashira with herons and reeds

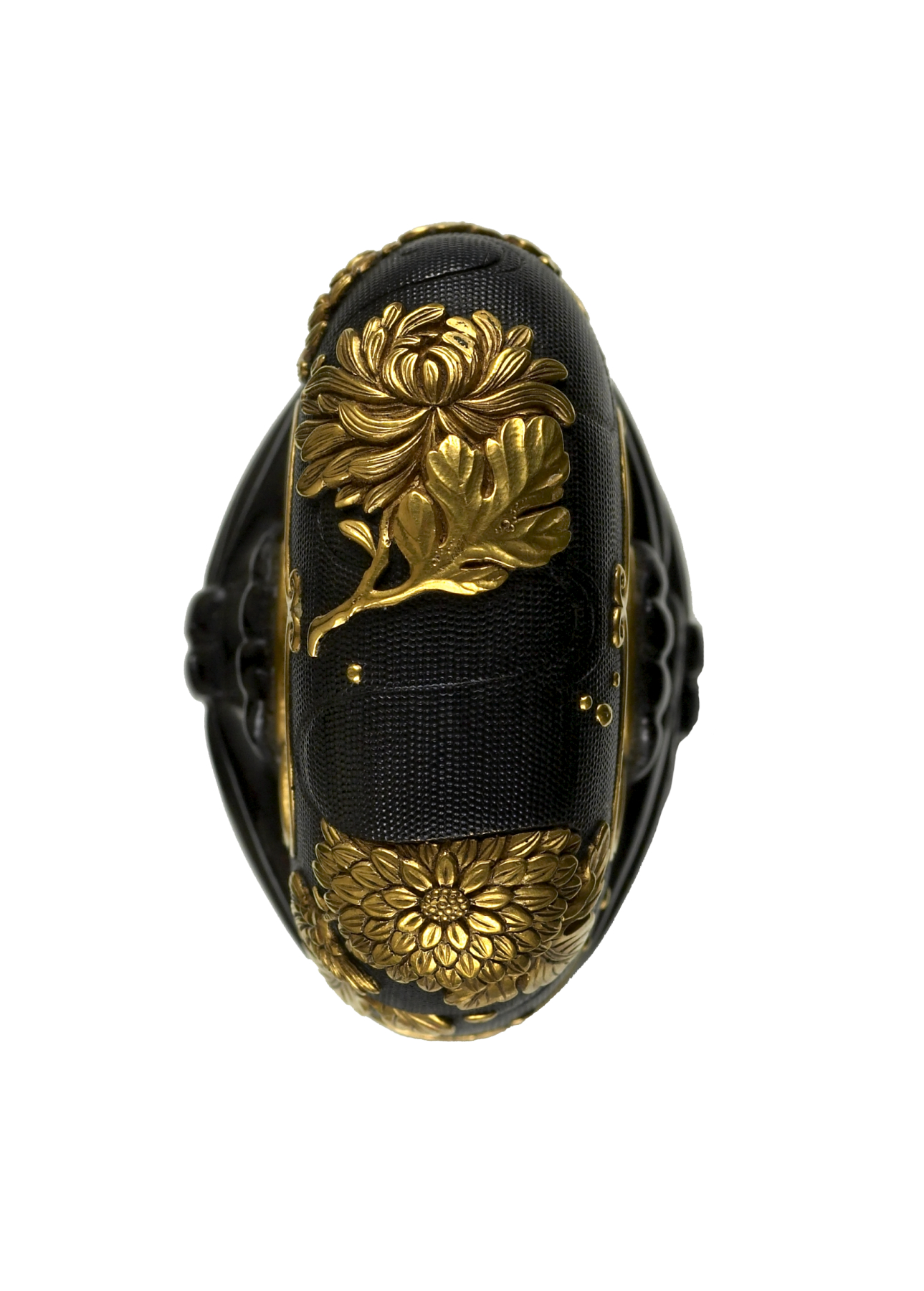

==== Tsuba ====
The tsuba (鍔; or 鐔) is usually a round (or occasionally squarish) guard at the end of the grip of bladed Japanese weapons, like the katana and its variations, tachi, wakizashi, tantō, naginata etc. They contribute to the balance of the weapon and to the protection of the hand. The tsuba was mostly meant to be used to prevent the hand from sliding onto the blade during thrusts as opposed to protecting from an opponent's blade. The chudan no kamae guard is determined by the tsuba and the curvature of the blade. The diameter of the average katana tsuba is 7.5–8 centimetres (3.0–3.1 in), wakizashi tsuba is 6.2–6.6 cm (2.4–2.6 in), and tantō tsuba is 4.5–6 cm (1.8–2.4 in).

During the Muromachi period (1333–1573) and the Momoyama period (1573–1603) tsuba were more for functionality than for decoration, being made of stronger metals and designs. During the Edo period (1603–1868) there was peace in Japan so tsuba became more ornamental and made of less practical metals such as gold.

Tsuba are usually finely decorated, and nowadays are collector's items. Tsuba were made by whole dynasties of craftsmen whose only craft was making tsuba. They were usually lavishly decorated. In addition to being collector's items, they were often used as heirlooms, passed from one generation to the next. Japanese families with samurai roots sometimes have their family crest (mon) crafted onto a tsuba. Tsuba can be found in a variety of metals and alloys, including iron, steel, brass, copper and shakudō. In a duel, two participants may lock their katana together at the point of the tsuba and push, trying to gain a better position from which to strike the other down. This is known as tsubazeriai (鍔迫り合い, lit. pushing tsuba against each other). Tsubazeriai is a common sight in modern kendō.

In modern Japanese, tsubazeriai (鍔迫り合い) has also come to mean "to be in fierce competition."

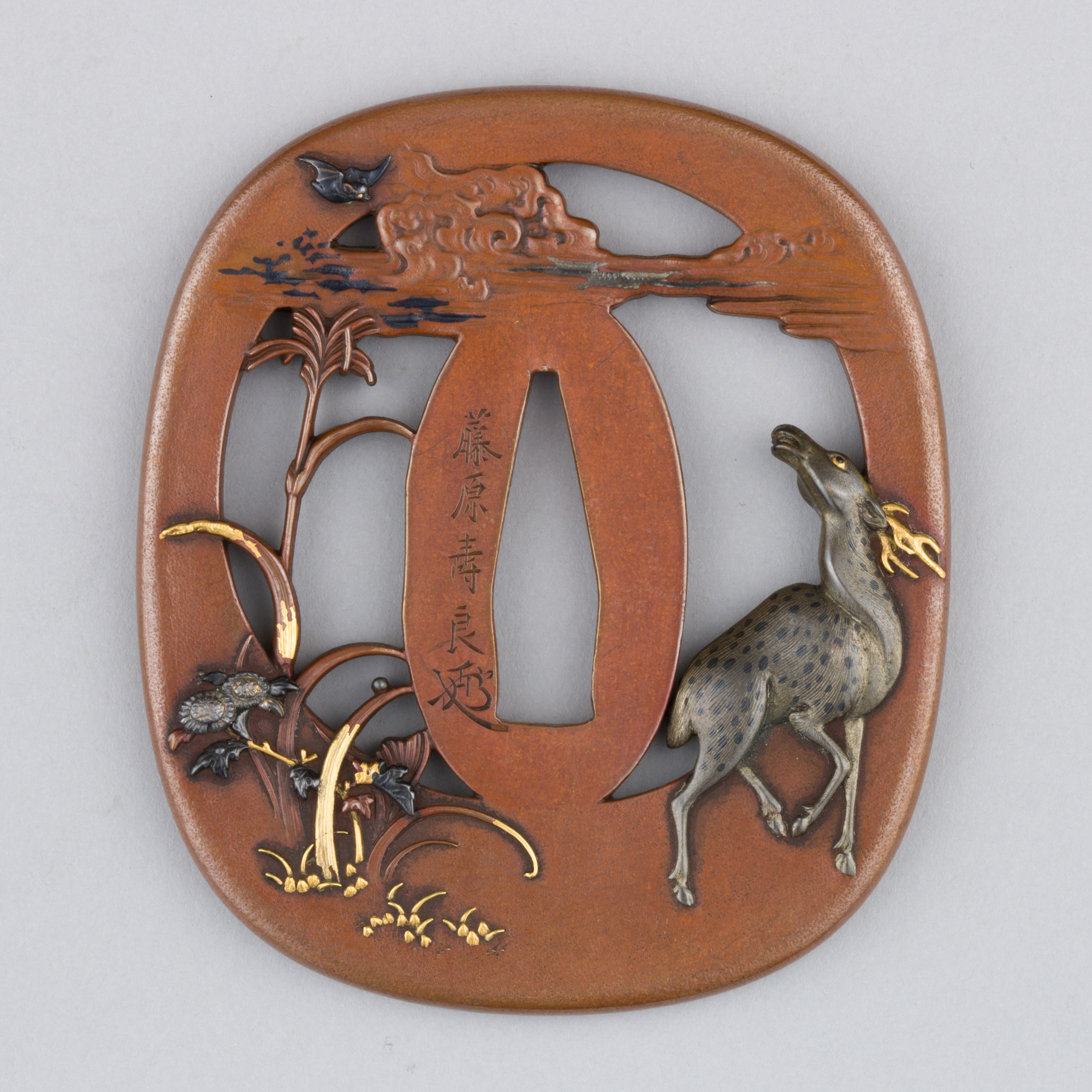
A tsuba carved with a sika deer made by Fujiwara Toshiyoshi. 1800s. The Metropolitan Museum of Art.

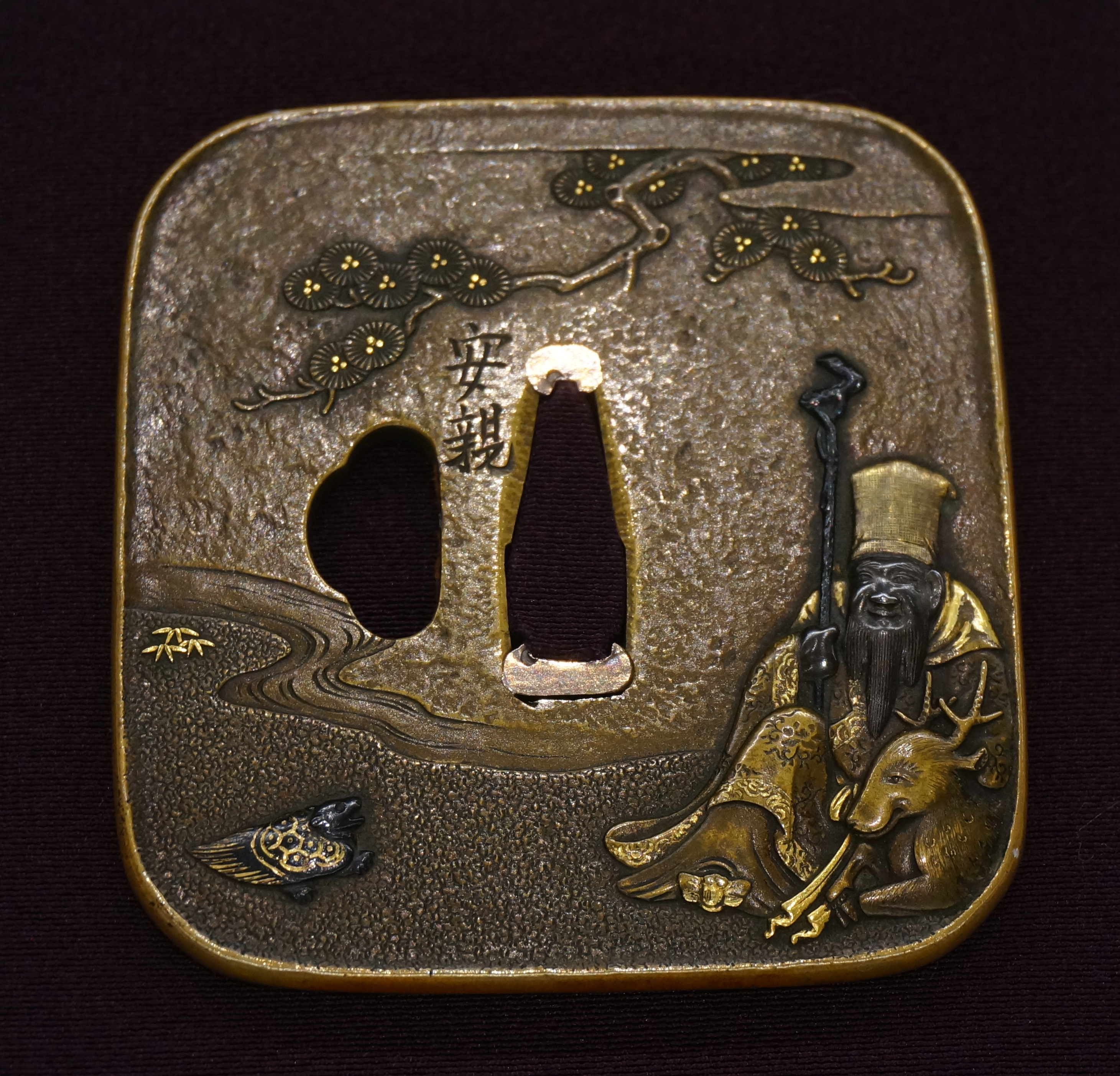
Tsuba made by Tsuchiya Yasuchika. Mid-Edo period. Designated as Special Important Fitting by NBTHK.

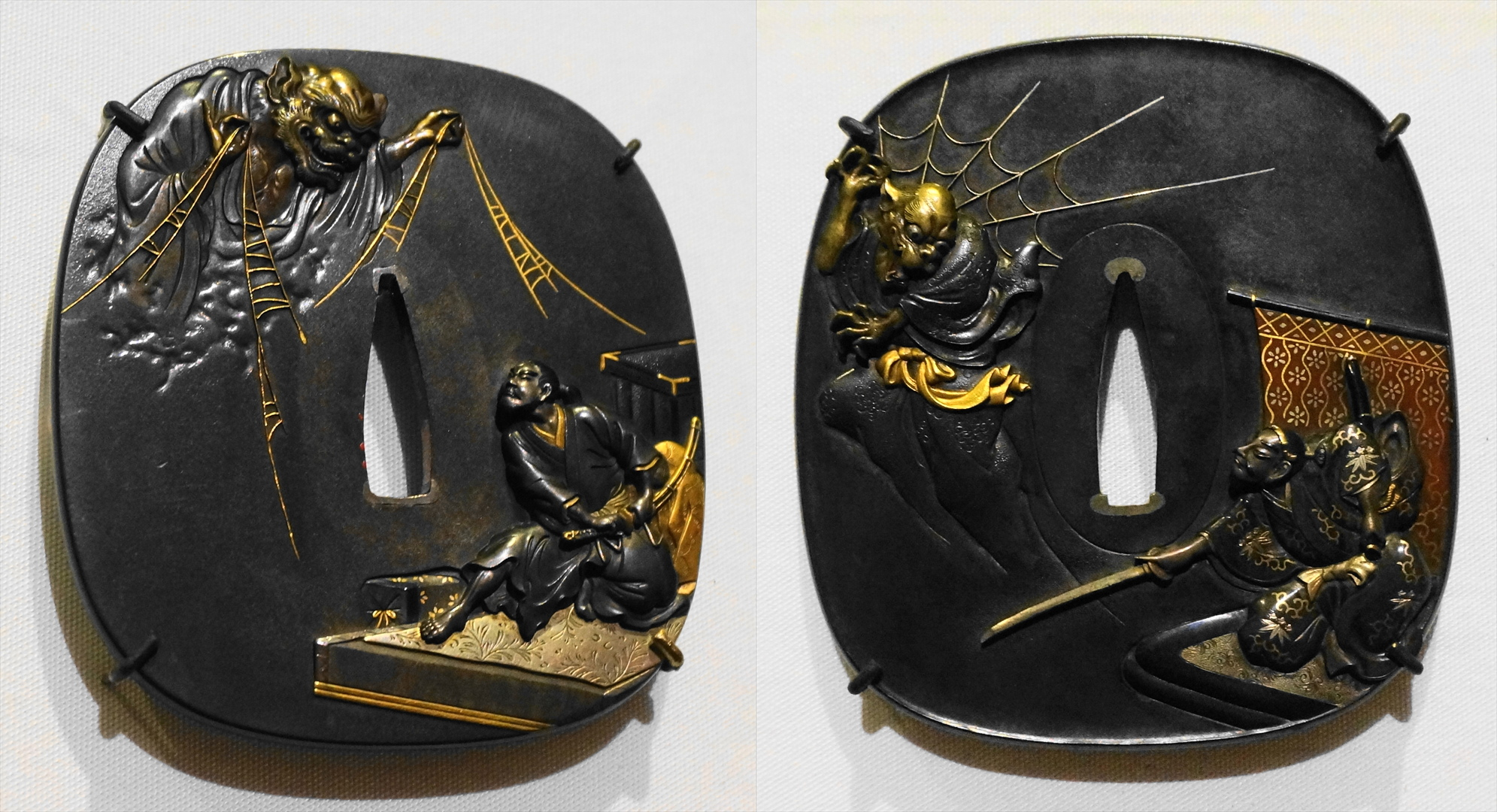
Two tsuba depicting Minamoto no Yorimitsu trying to cut a tsuchigumo with a tachi named 'Hizamaru'. Made by Unnno Yoshimori I (left), Gochiku Sadakatsu (right). Museum of Fine Arts, Boston.

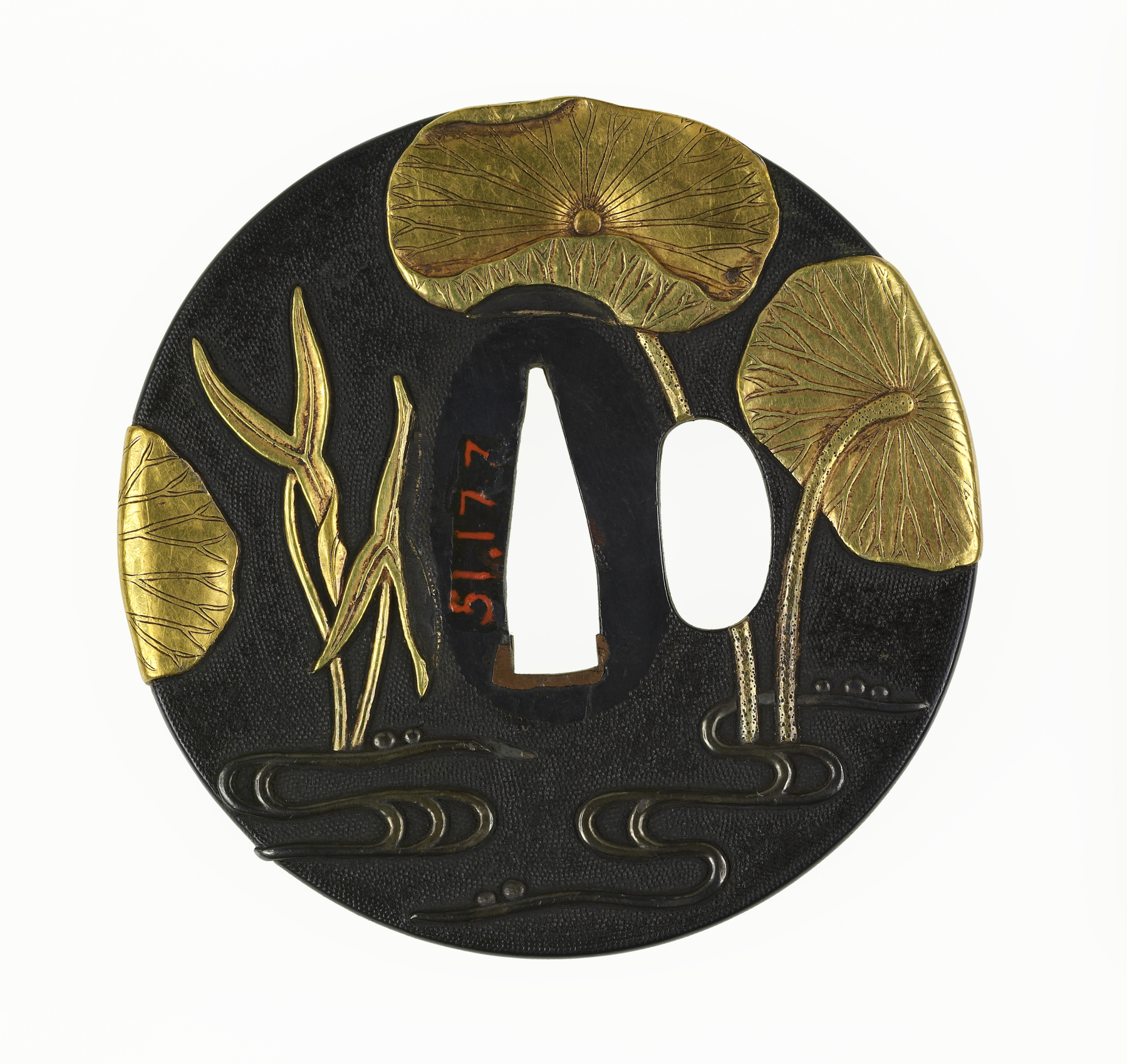
Lotus pond

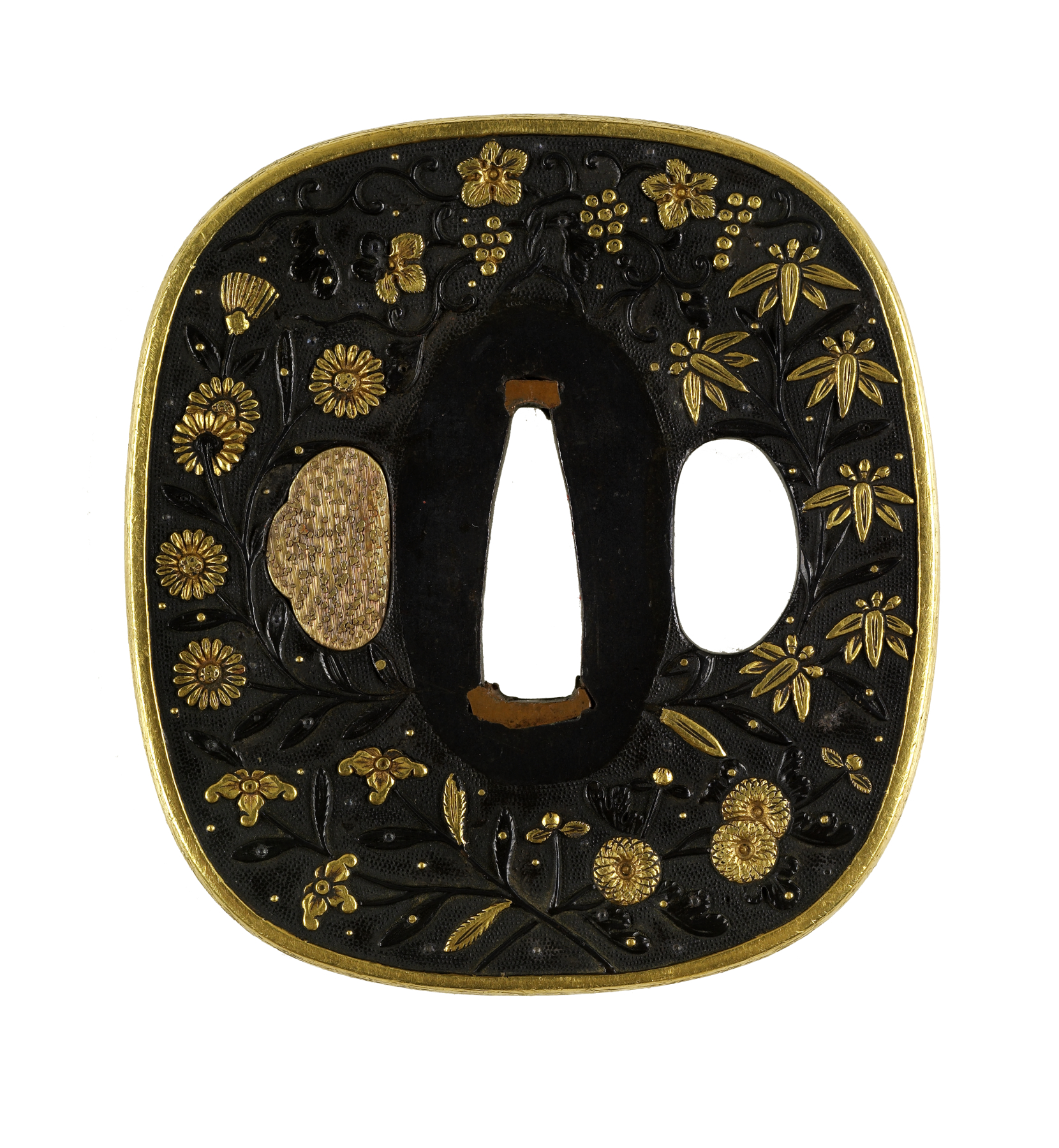
Tsuba with autumn flowers

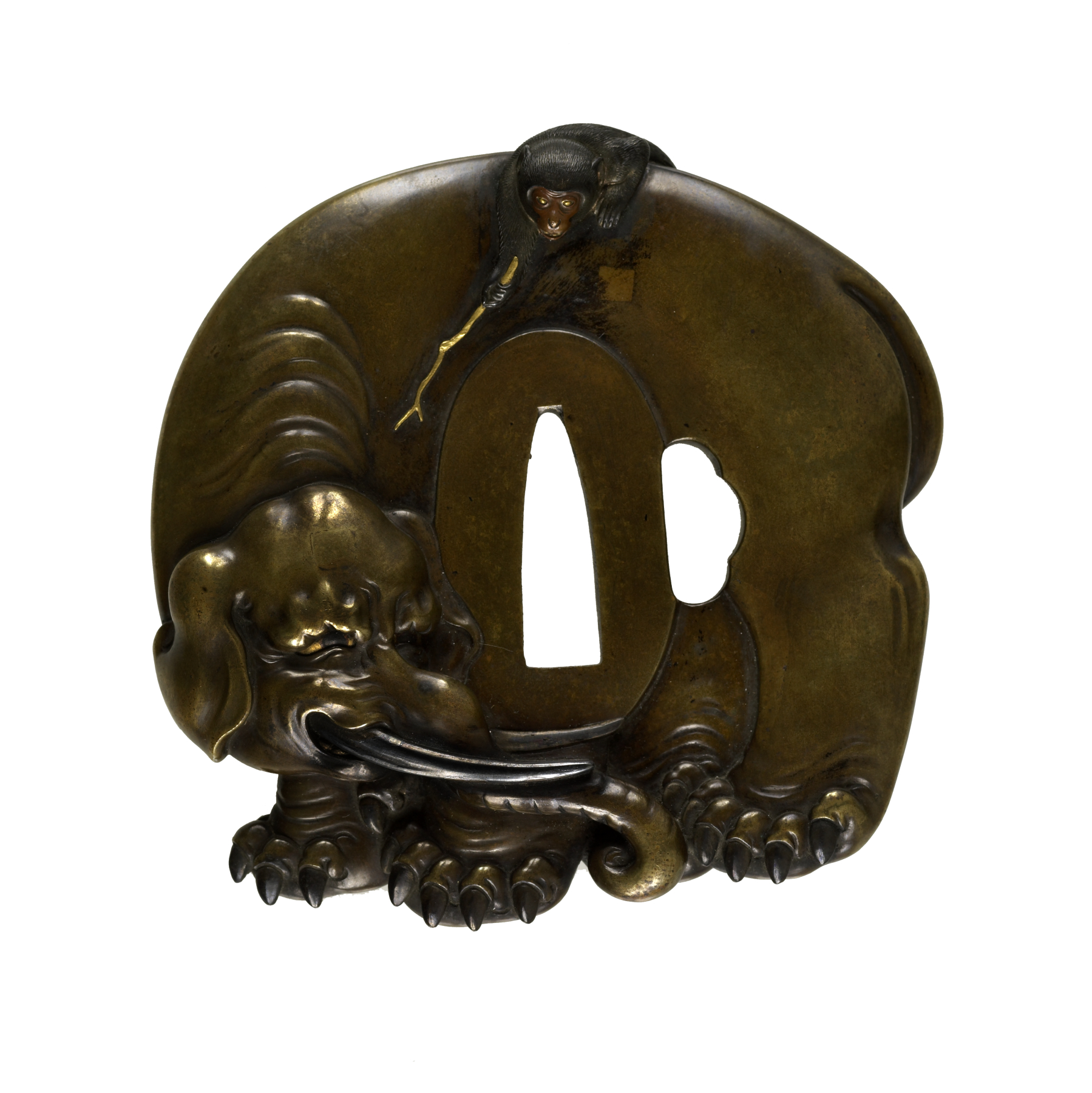
Tsuba with a monkey teasing an elephant with a stick

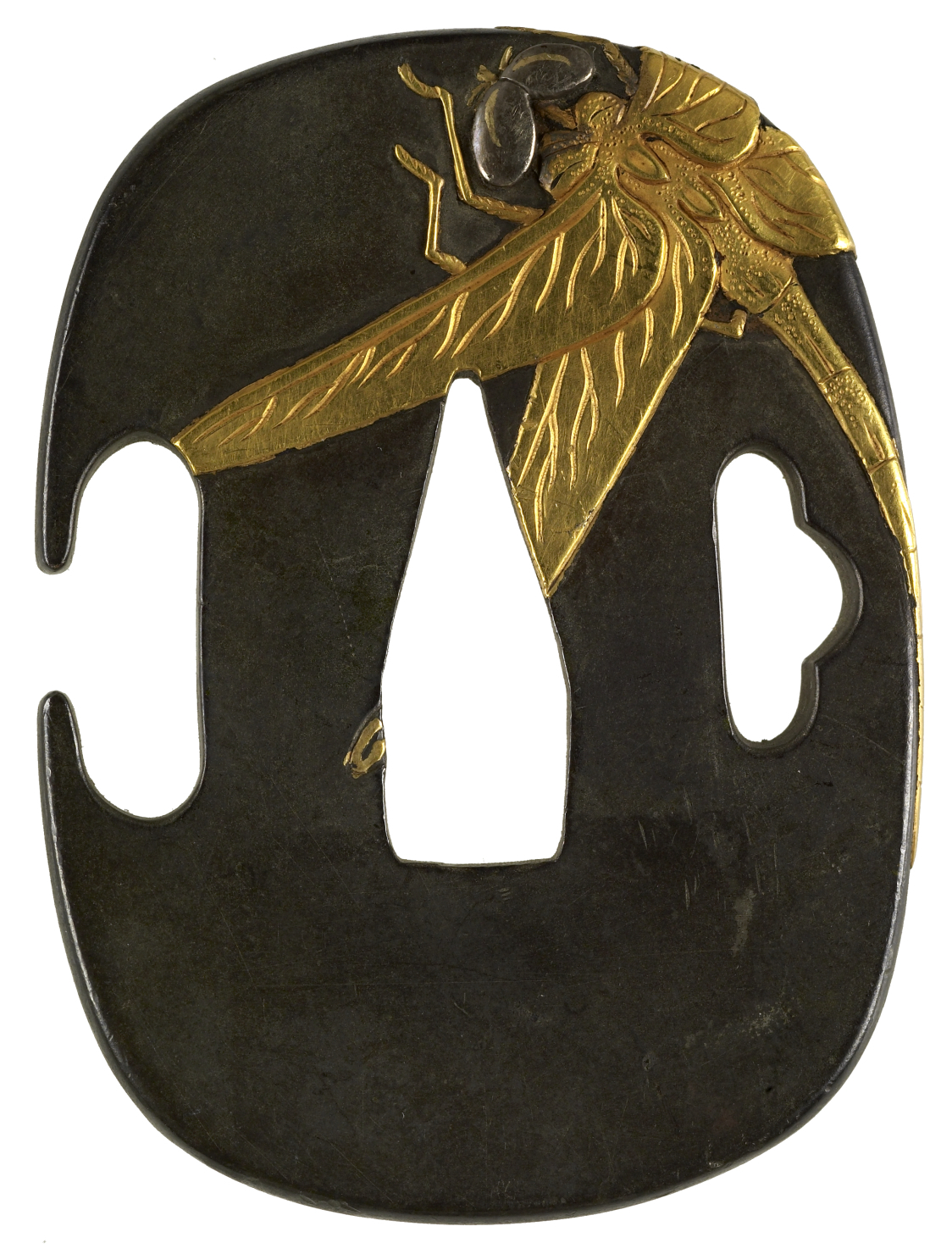
Tsuba with dragonfly in shibuichi

==== Seppa ====
The seppa (切羽) are washers used in front of and behind the tsuba to tighten the fittings. Seppa can be ornate or plain.

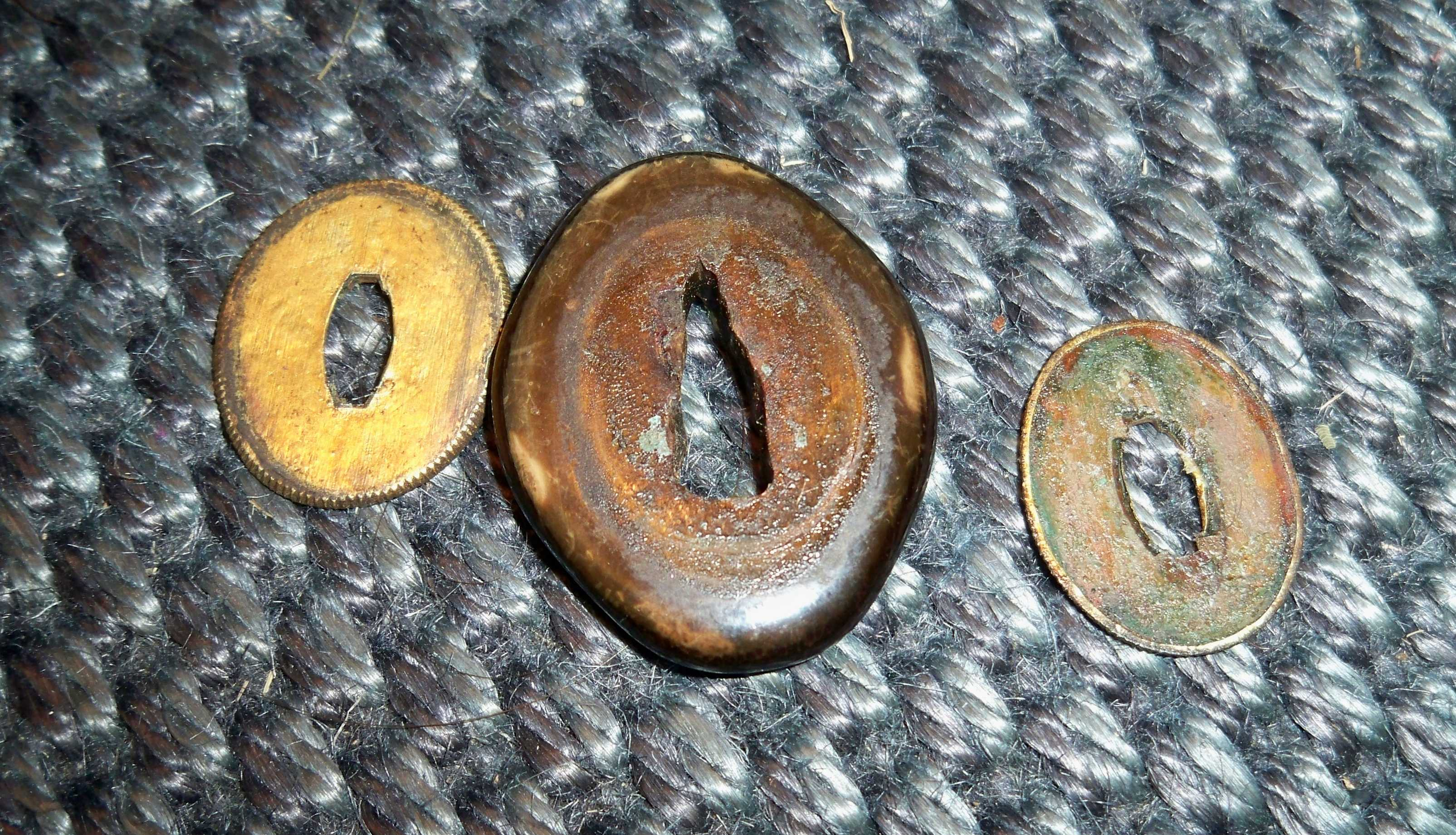
Tantō tsuba and two seppa

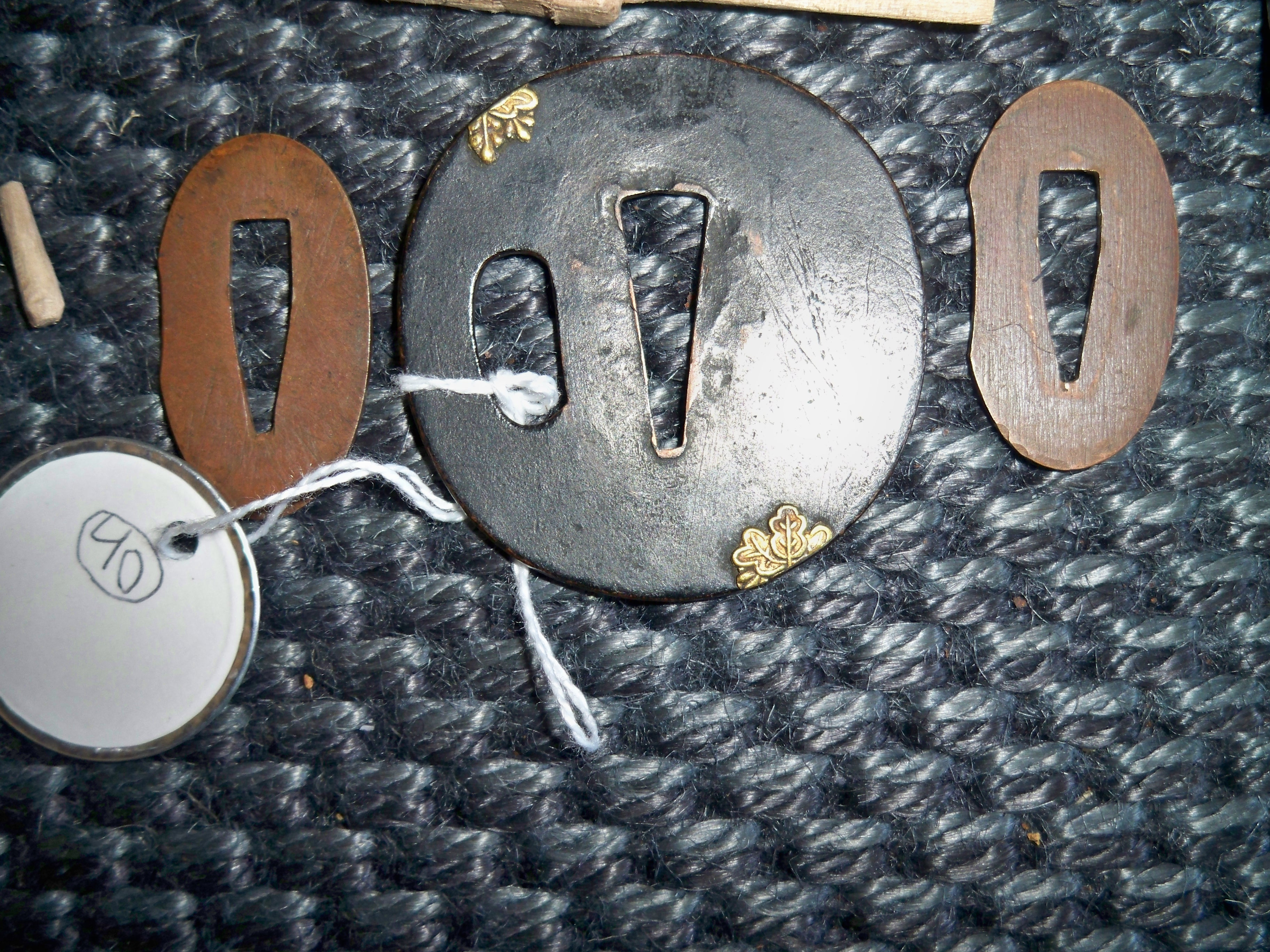
Tantō tsuba and two seppa

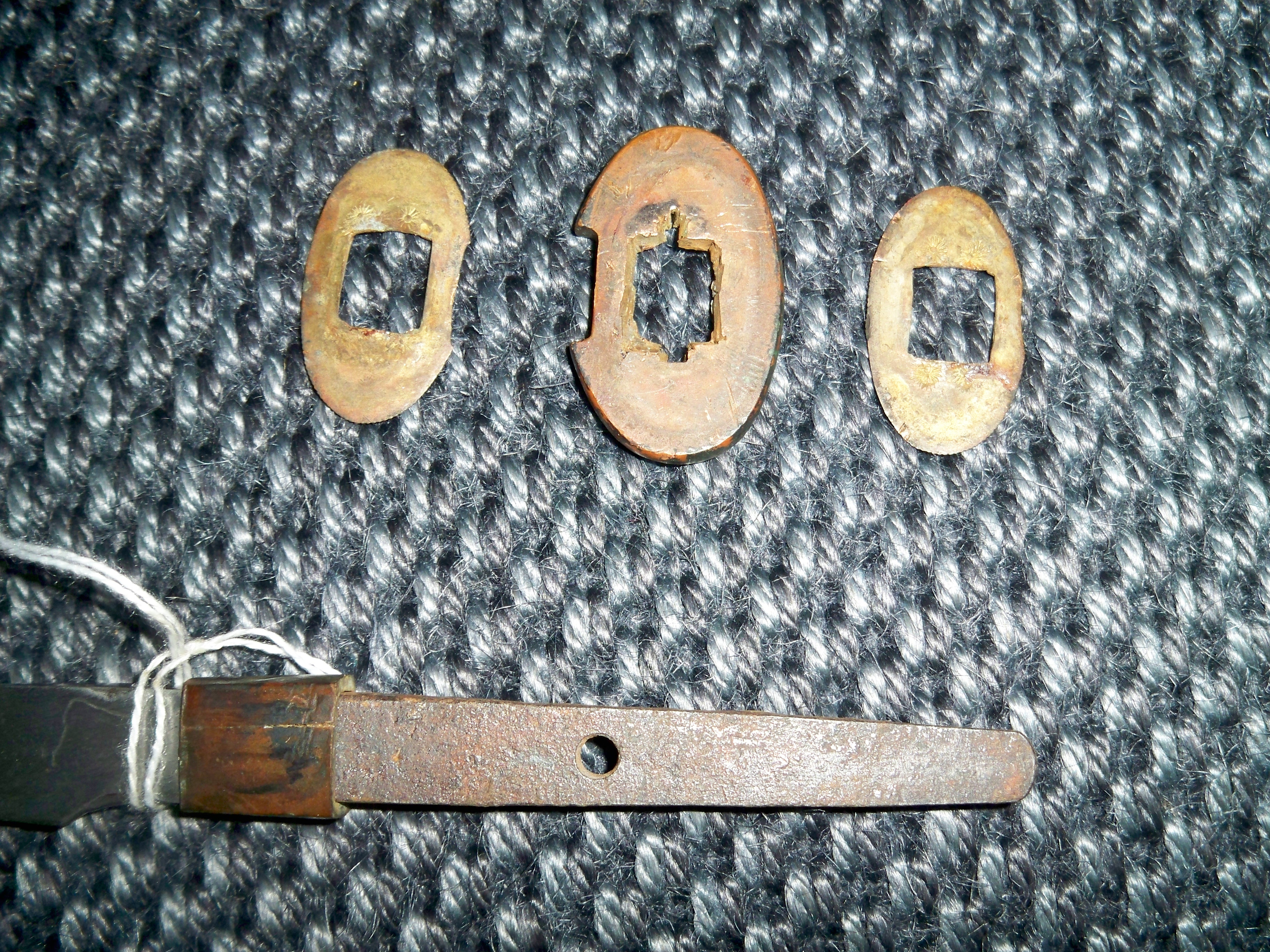
Yari tantō tsuba and two seppa

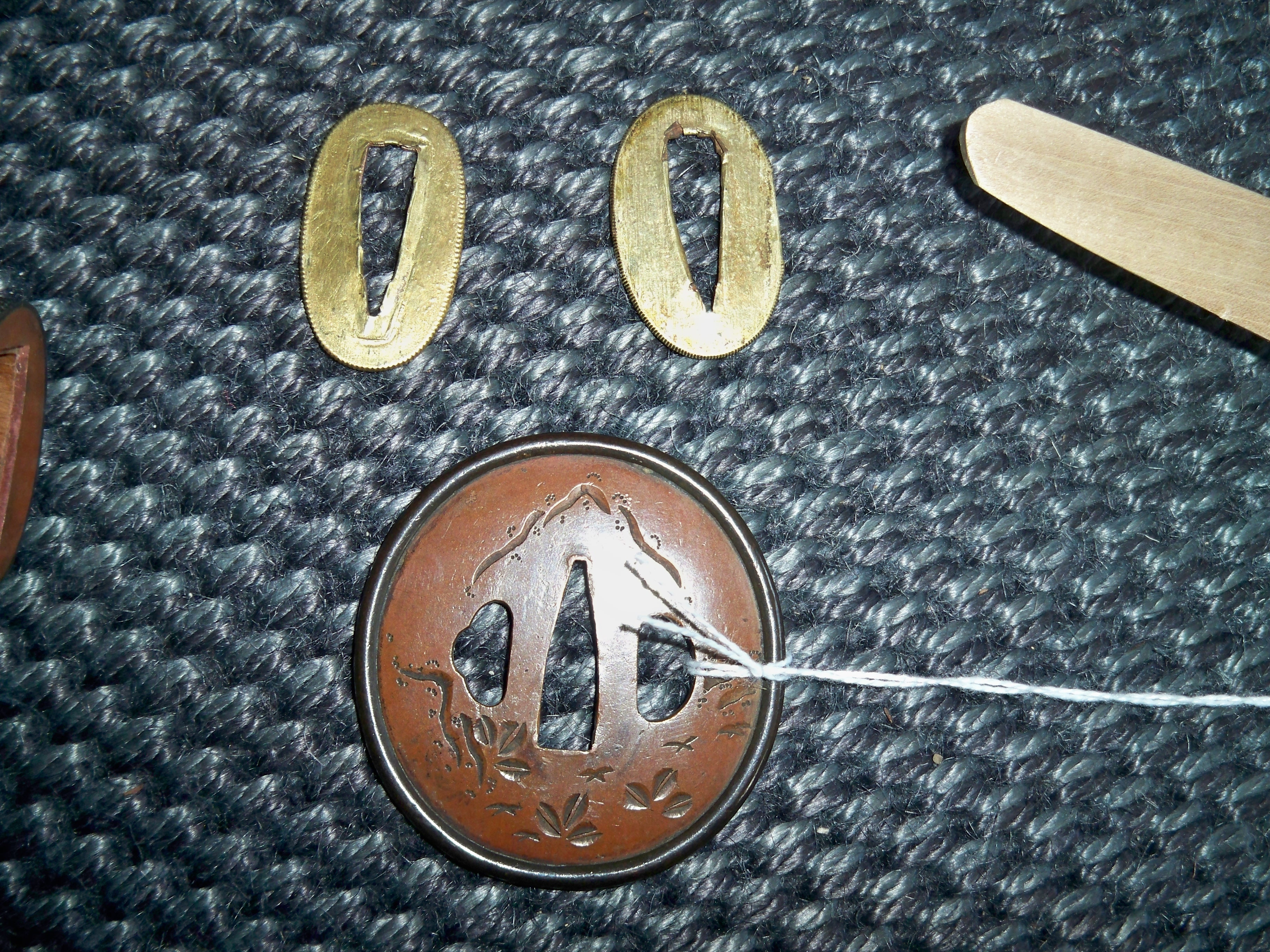
Tsuba and two seppa

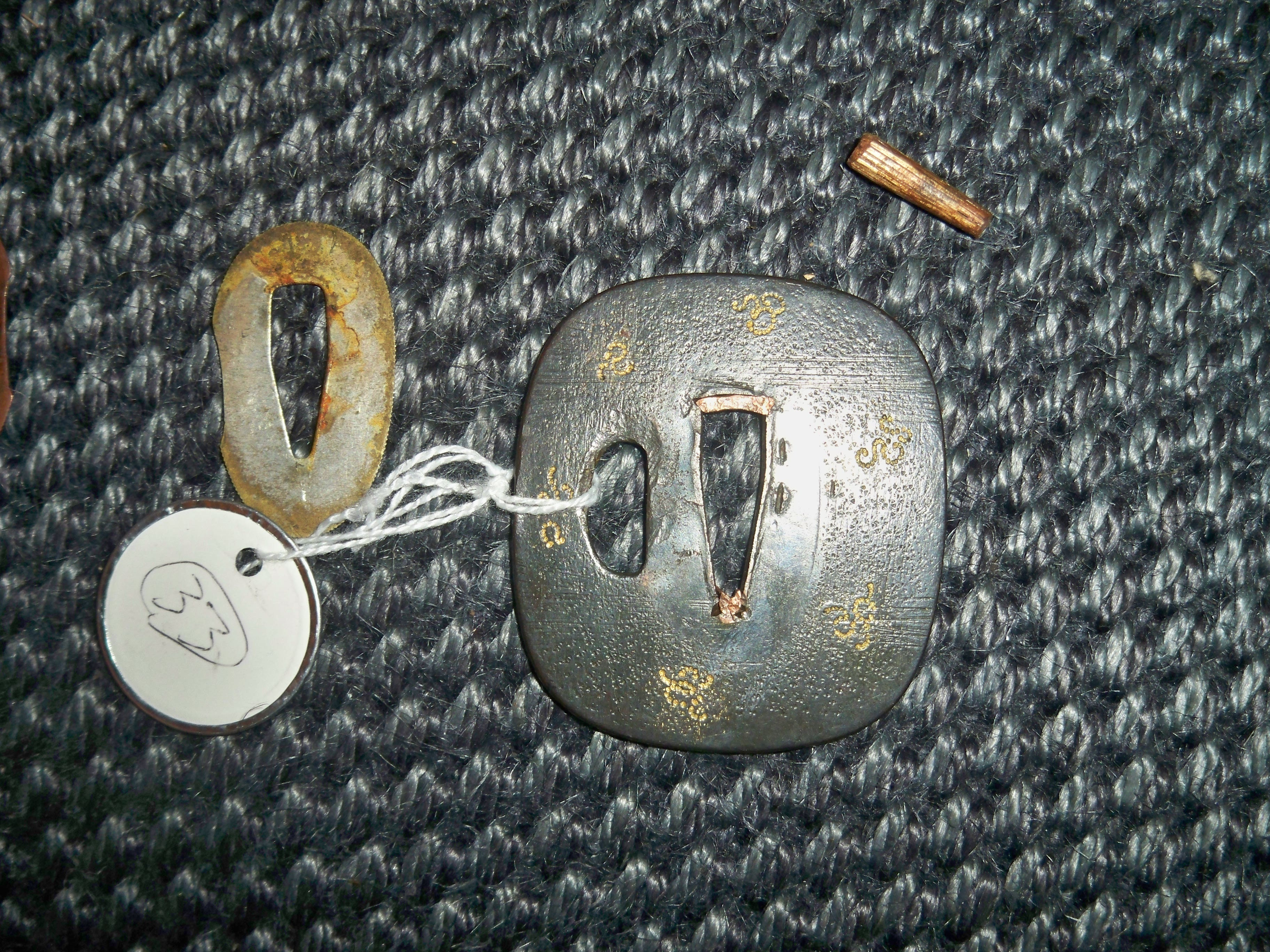
Wakizashi tsuba and a single seppa

==== Habaki ====
The habaki (鎺) is a piece of metal encircling the base of the blade of a Japanese sword. It has the double purpose of locking the tsuba (guard) in place, and to maintain the weapon in its saya (scabbard).

The importance of the habaki is seen in drawing the katana from the scabbard. It is drawn by grasping the scabbard near the top and pressing the guard with the thumb to emerge the blade just enough to unwedge the habaki from inside the scabbard in a process called koiguchi no kirikata (鯉口の切り方) "cutting the koiguchi". The blade, being freed, can be drawn out very quickly. This is known as koiguchi o kiru (鯉口を切る), nukitsuke (抜き付け), or tanka o kiru (啖呵を切る) "clearing the tanka". The expression "tanka o kiru" is now widely used in Japan, in the sense of "getting ready to begin something", or "getting ready to speak", especially with an aggressive connotation.

The habaki will cause normal wear and tear inside the scabbard, and either a shim or a total replacement of the scabbard may be needed to remedy the issue as it will become too loose over time. Removing the habaki and oiling it after cutting or once every few months is recommended.

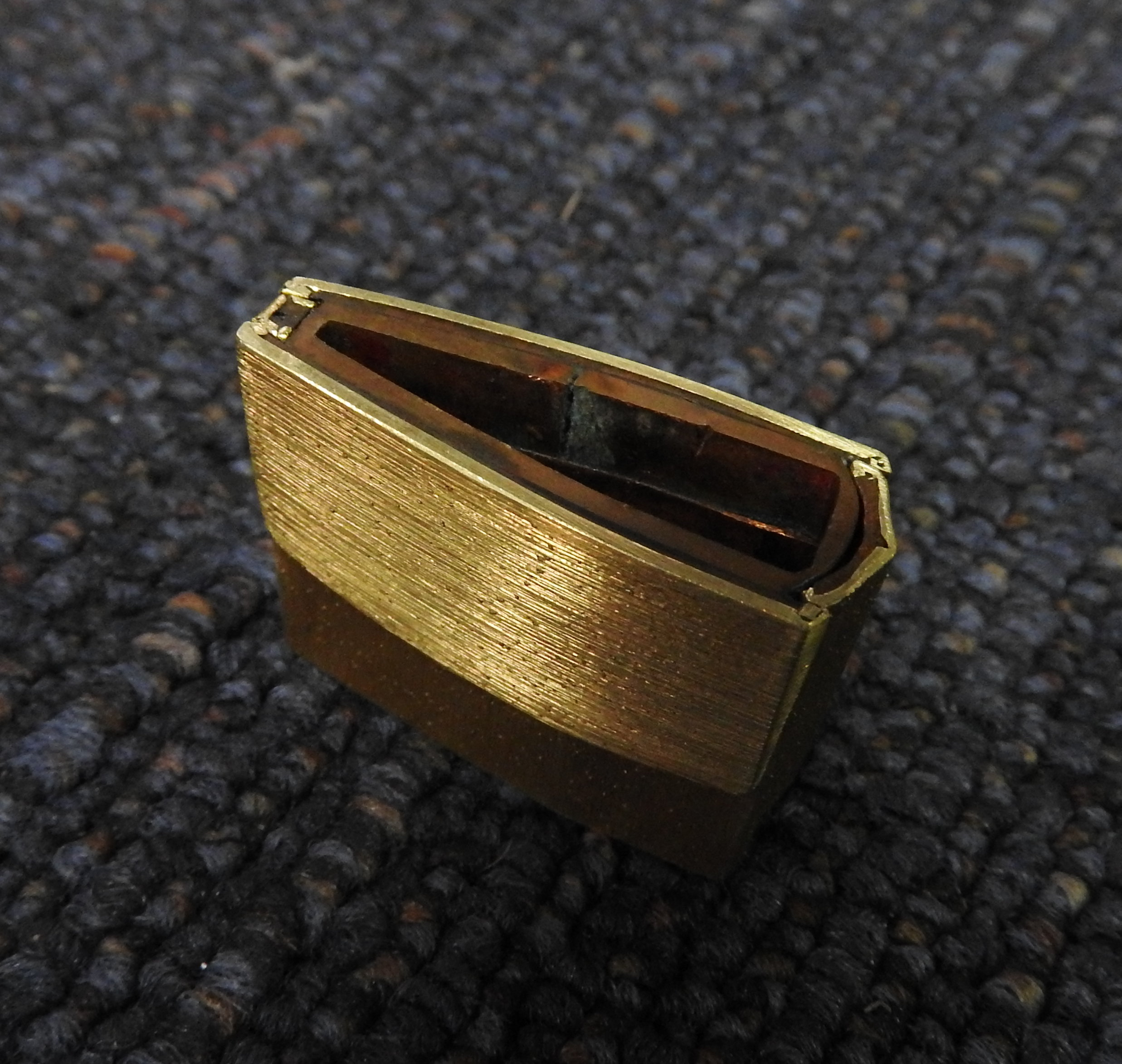
A habaki in gold

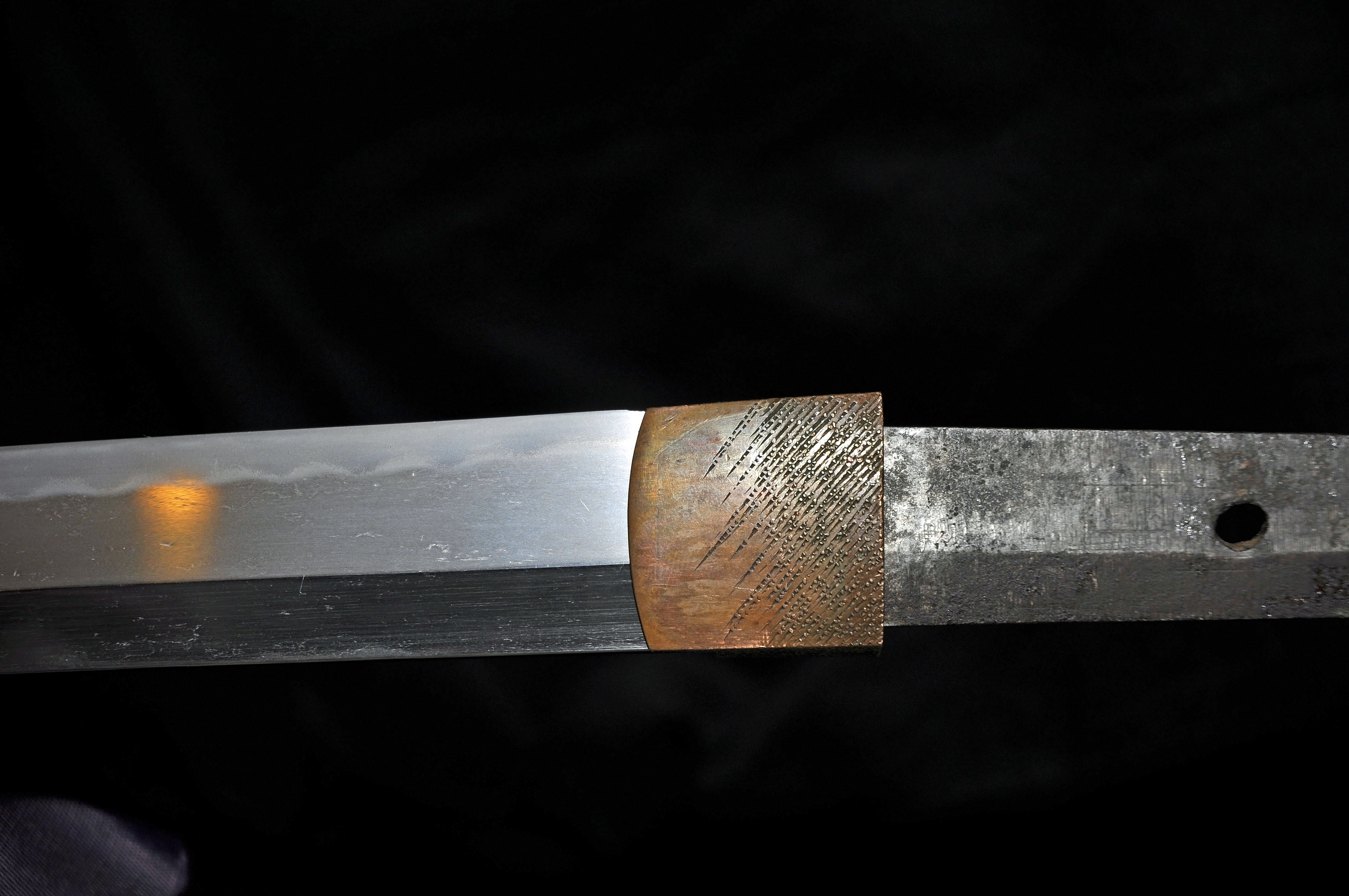
It is first inserted on the blade.

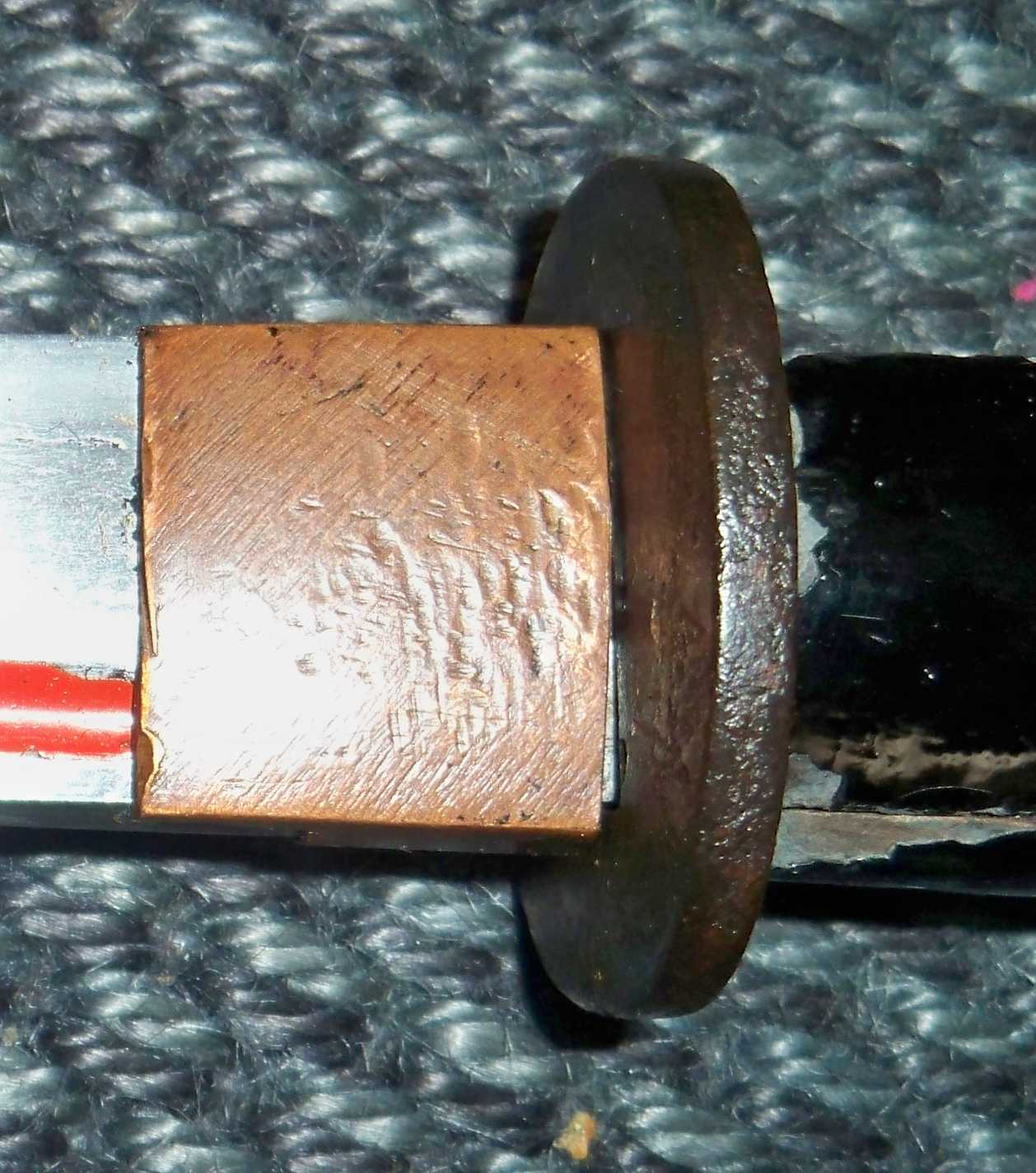
Then the tsuba is inserted too.

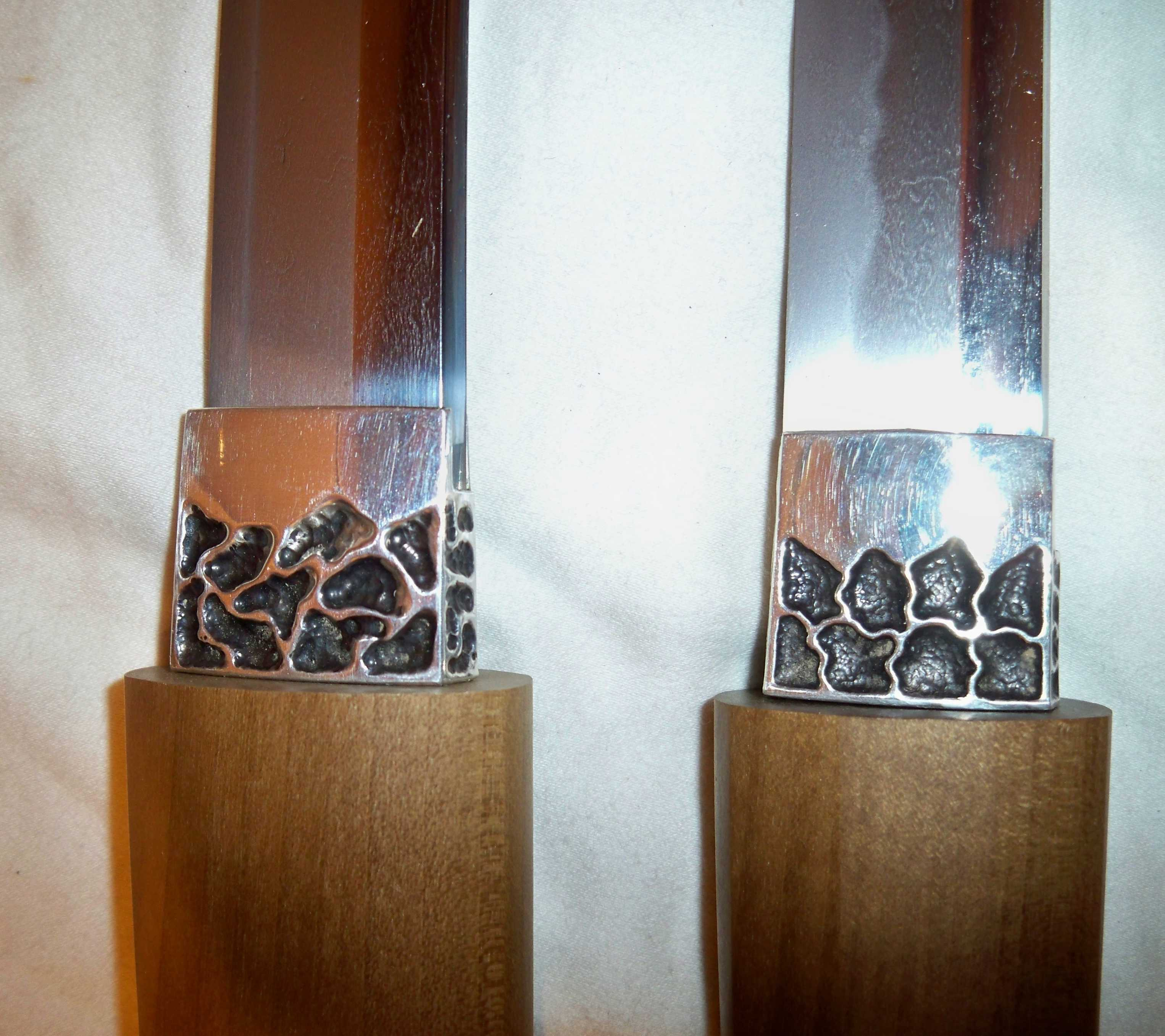
A pair of daishō with silver habaki

== See also ==
- List of National Treasures of Japan (crafts-swords)
- Tsuba in the collection of Wolverhampton Art Gallery, England
