= Elbe-Saale =

Coordinates: 51°58′N 11°52′E

Elbe-Saale was a Verwaltungsgemeinschaft ("collective municipality") in the district Salzlandkreis, in Saxony-Anhalt, Germany. It was situated on the left bank of the Elbe, around the confluence with the Saale. The seat of the Verwaltungsgemeinschaft was in Barby.

It was disbanded on 1 January 2010.

The Verwaltungsgemeinschaft Elbe-Saale consisted of the following municipalities:

1. Barby
2. Breitenhagen
3. Glinde
4. Gnadau
5. Groß Rosenburg
6. Lödderitz
7. Pömmelte
8. Sachsendorf
9. Tornitz
10. Wespen
11. Zuchau
