= Sachsendorf =

Sachsendorf may refer to the following places in Germany:

- Sachsendorf, Saxony-Anhalt
- Sachsendorf, Saxony, near Wermsdorf
