= Nebra sky disc =

Bronze artefact, c. 1600 BC, found in Nebra, Germany

The Nebra sky disc
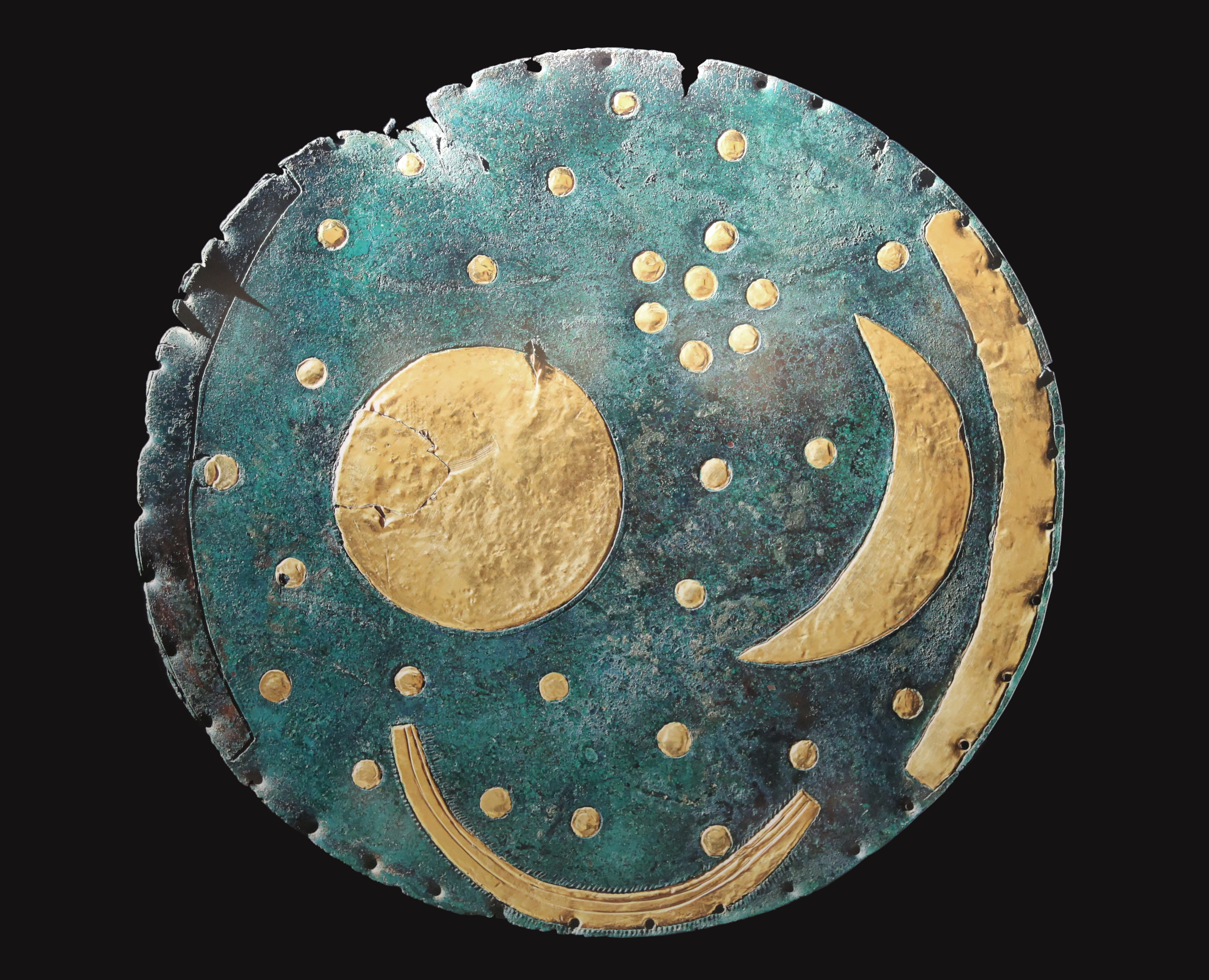
- Material: Bronze, Gold
- Width: 30 cm (12 in)
- Weight: 2.2 kg (4.9 lb)
- Created: c. 1800–1600 BCE
- Period/culture: Early Bronze Age
- Discovered: 1999; 51°17′02″N 11°31′12″E
- Place: Nebra (Unstrut), Saxony-Anhalt, Germany
- Present location: Halle State Museum of Prehistory
- Registration: Nebra Sky Disc — Bronze Age representation of the sky, Germany
- Culture: Únětice culture
- Nebra Sky Disc

The Nebra sky disc (German: Himmelsscheibe von Nebra, pronounced [ˈhɪml̩sˌʃaɪbə fɔn ˈneːbra]) is a bronze disc of around 30 cm (12 in) diameter and a weight of 2.2 kg (4.9 lb), having a blue-green patina and inlaid with gold symbols. These symbols are interpreted generally as the Sun or full moon, a lunar crescent, and stars, including a cluster of seven stars, axiomatically interpreted as the Pleiades.

Two golden arcs along the sides (one now missing) are thought to have marked the angle between the solstices. Another arc at the bottom with internal parallel lines is usually interpreted as a solar boat with numerous oars, although some authors have also suggested that it may represent a rainbow, the Aurora Borealis, a comet, or a sickle.

In 1999, the disc was found buried on the Mittelberg hill near Nebra in Germany. It is dated by archaeologists to c. 1800–1600 BC and attributed to the Early Bronze Age Únětice culture. Various scientific analyses of the disc, the items found with the disc, and the find spot have confirmed the Early Bronze Age dating.

The Nebra sky disc features the oldest concrete depiction of astronomical phenomena known from anywhere in the world. In June 2013, it was included by UNESCO in its Memory of the World International Register and termed "one of the most important archaeological finds of the twentieth century."

== Discovery ==
The disc, together with two bronze swords, two sets of remains of axes, a chisel, and fragments of spiral armbands were discovered in 1999 by Henry Westphal and Mario Renner while they were treasure-hunting with a metal detector. The detectorists were operating without a license and knew their activity constituted looting and was illegal. Archaeological artefacts are the property of the state in Saxony-Anhalt. They damaged the disc with their spade and destroyed parts of the site. The next day, Westphal and Renner sold the entire hoard for 31,000 DM to a dealer in Cologne. The hoard changed hands, probably several times, within Germany during the next two years, being sold for up to a million DM. By 2001 knowledge of its existence had become public.

In February 2002, the state archaeologist, Harald Meller, acquired the disc in a police-led sting operation in Basel from a couple who had put it on the black market for 700,000 DM. The original finders were eventually traced. In a plea bargain, they led police and archaeologists to the discovery site. Archaeologists opened a dig at the site and uncovered evidence that supported the looters' claims. There were traces of bronze artefacts in the ground, and the soil at the site matched soil samples found clinging to the artefacts. The disc and its accompanying finds are held by the State Museum of Prehistory in Halle, Saxony-Anhalt, Germany.

The two looters received sentences of four months and ten months, respectively, from a Naumburg court in September 2003. They appealed, but the Appeals Court raised their sentences to six and twelve months, respectively.

The discovery site is a prehistoric enclosure encircling the top of a 252 metres (827 ft) elevation in the Ziegelroda Forest, known as Mittelberg ("central hill"), some 60 kilometres (37 mi) west of Leipzig. The surrounding area is known to have been settled in the Neolithic era, and Ziegelroda Forest contains approximately 1,000 barrows.

At the enclosure's location, the sun seems to set every summer solstice behind the Brocken, the highest peak of the Harz mountains, some 80 kilometres (50 mi) to the northwest. The treasure hunters claimed the artefacts were discovered within a pit inside the bank-and-ditch enclosure.

== Dating ==
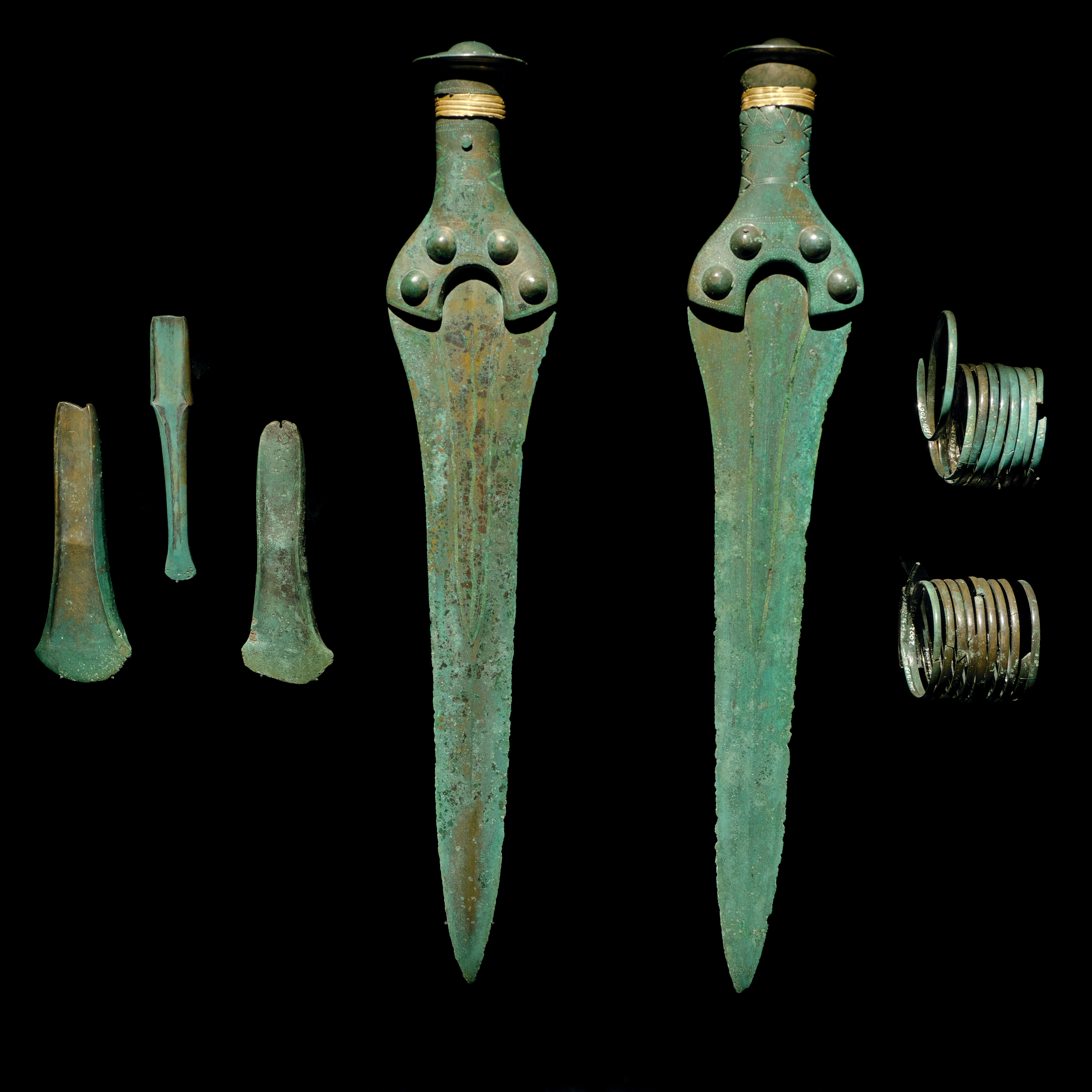
Bronze swords (with gold decoration), axeheads, spiral bracelets and chisel found buried with the Nebra disc

Axes and swords found buried with the disc were dated typologically to c. 1700–1500 BCE. Remains of birch bark found in the sword hilts have been Radiocarbon dated to between 1600 and 1560 BCE, confirming this estimate. This corresponds to the date of burial, at which time the disc had likely been in existence for several generations. Analyses of metal radioactivity and the corrosion layer on the disc further support the early Bronze Age dating.

== Origin of the metals ==
According to an initial analysis of trace elements by x-ray fluorescence by E. Pernicka, then at the University of Freiberg, the copper originated at Bischofshofen in Austria, whilst the gold was thought to be from the Carpathian Mountains. A more recent analysis found that the gold used in the first development phase (see below) was from the River Carnon in southern Cornwall in England. The tin present in the bronze was also of Cornish origin.

== History ==
As preserved, the disc was developed in four stages:

1. Initially the disc had thirty-two small round gold circles, a large circular plate, and a large crescent-shaped plate attached. The circular plate is interpreted as either the Sun or the full Moon, the crescent shape as the crescent Moon (or either the Sun or the Moon undergoing eclipse), and the dots as stars, with the cluster of seven dots likely representing a star cluster. The star cluster is thought to refer to the Pleiades, or possibly the general symbol of a star cluster.
2. At some later date, two arcs (constructed from gold of different origins, as shown by their chemical impurities) were added at opposite edges of the disc. To make space for these arcs, one small circle was moved from the left side toward the centre of the disc and two of the circles on the right were covered over, so that thirty remain visible. The two arcs span an angle of 82°, correctly indicating the angle between the positions of sunsets at summer and winter solstice as seen at the latitude of the Mittelberg (51°N). The arcs relate to the Sun's path – the ecliptic. Given that ancient astronomers knew the planets and many stars that mark the ecliptic, they could observe it sweep across the horizon within the arcs, in a single winter night, not just sunrise and sunset over an entire year. Thus, the arcs are consistent with wholly nighttime use.
3. The final addition was another arc at the bottom, identified as a solar boat, again made of gold, but originating from a different source.
4. By the time the disc was buried, it also had 38 to 40 holes punched out around its perimeter, each approximately 3 millimetres (0.12 in) in diameter. The exact number is obscured by damage to the disc edge.
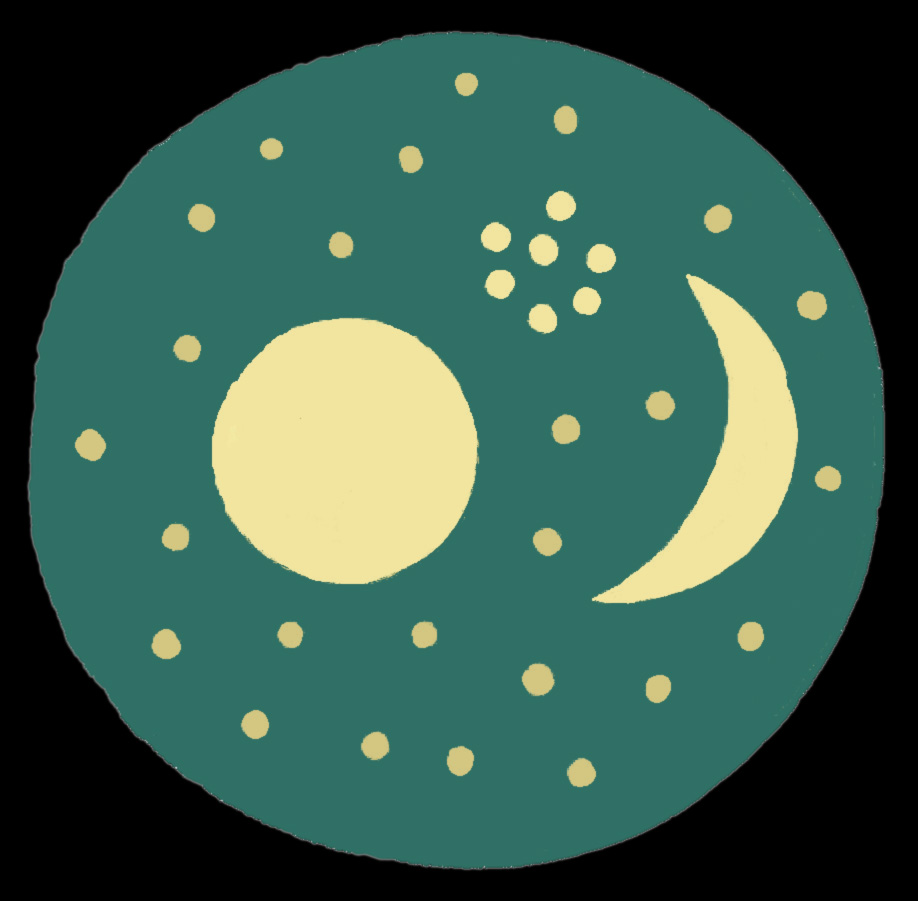
1) On the left the Sun or the Full Moon, on the right the Waxing Moon, and between and above, the Pleiades

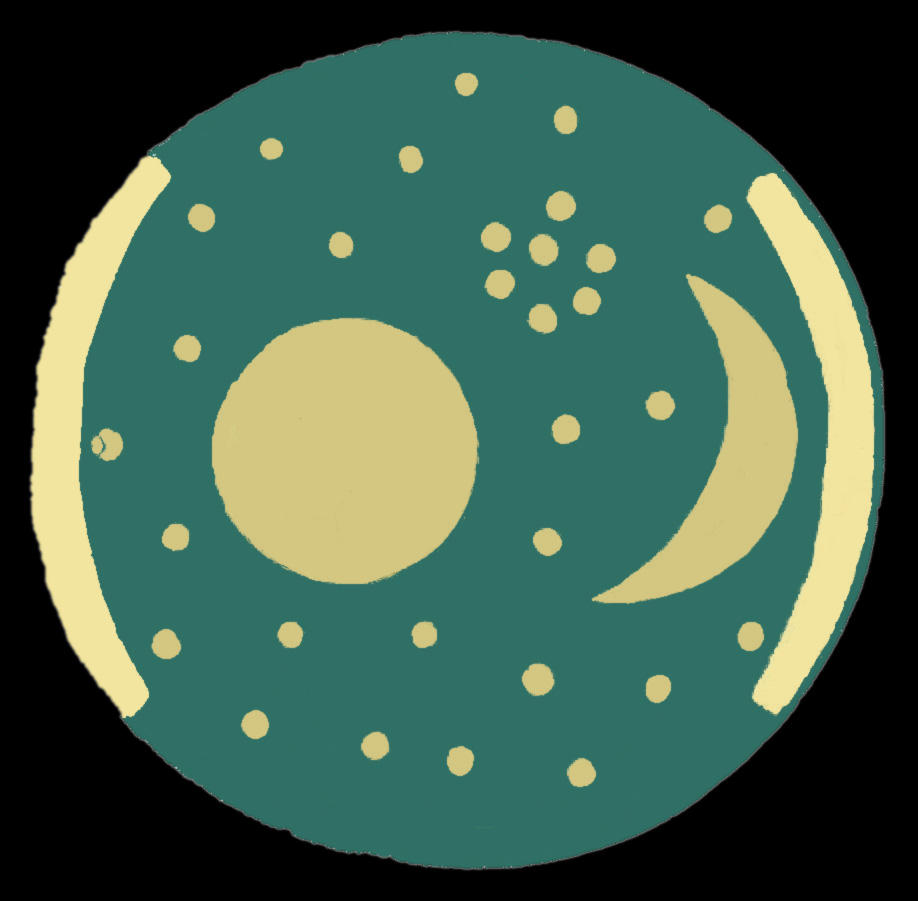
2) Arcs were added on the horizon for the zones of the rising and setting Sun; individual stars were shifted and/or covered

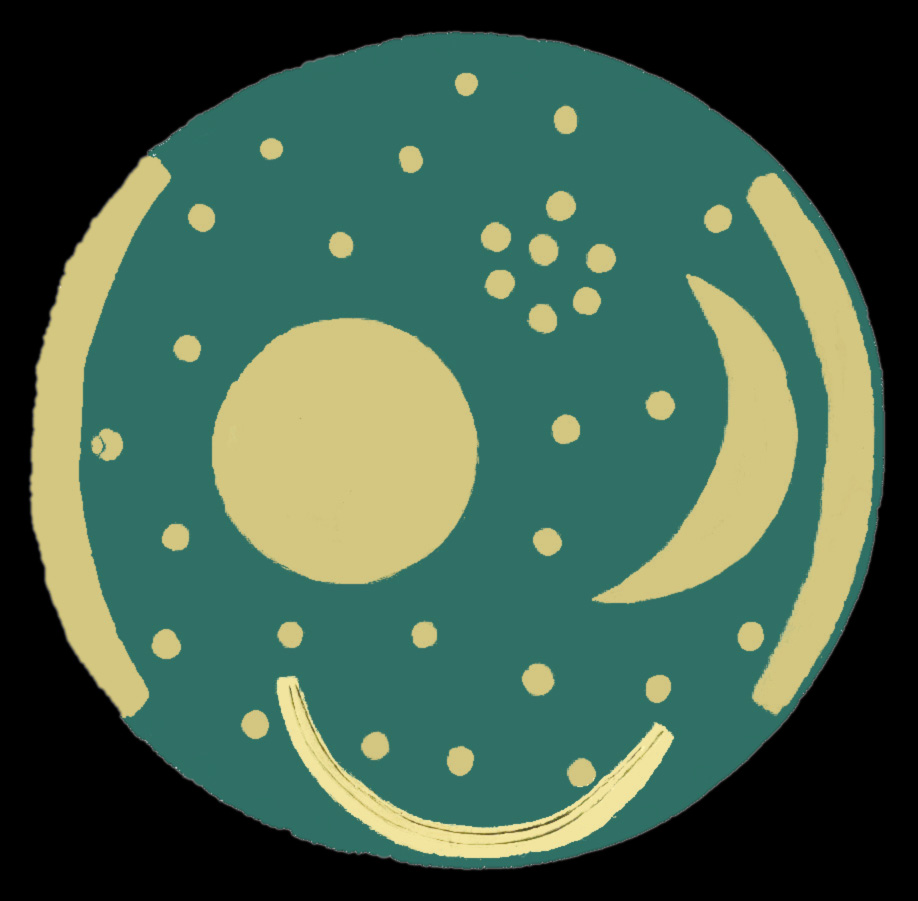
3) Addition of the "solar boat"

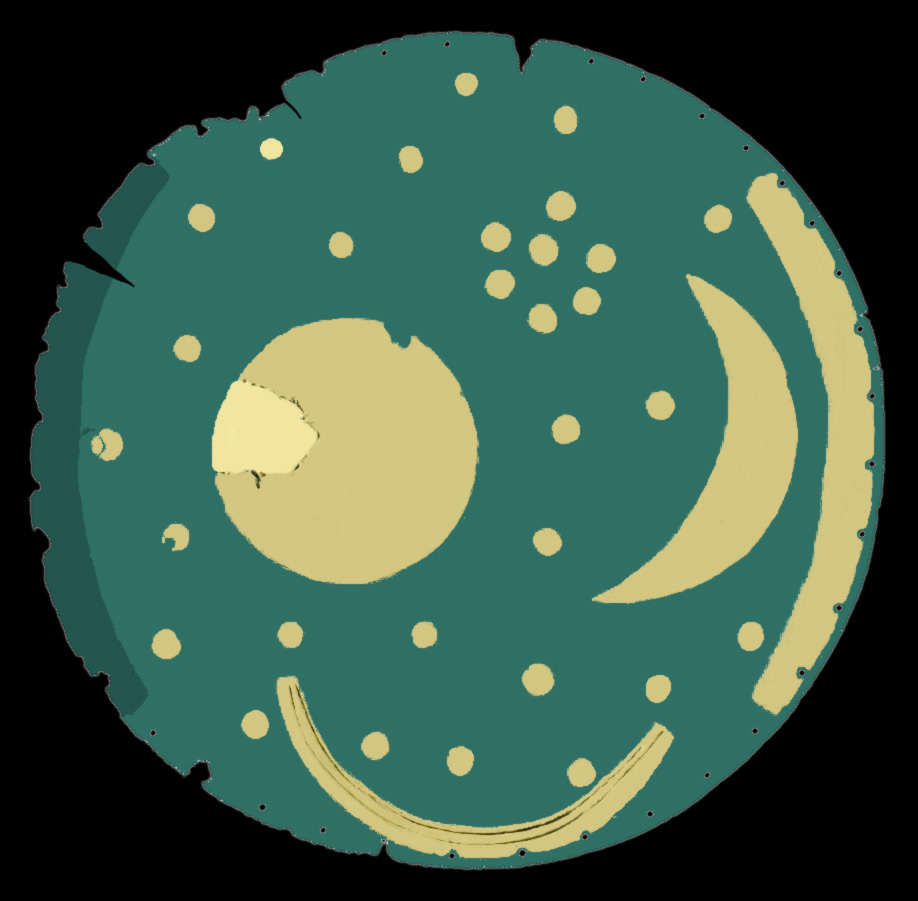
4) Diagram of the disc in its current condition (a star and a part of the Sun—or Full Moon—have been restored)

== Significance ==
Video explaining the significance of the sky disc

The Nebra disc may have had both a practical astronomical purpose as well as a religious significance.

The find is regarded as reconfirming that the astronomical knowledge and abilities of the people of the European Bronze Age included close observation of the yearly course of the Sun and the angle between its rising and setting points at the summer and winter solstices. While older earthworks and megalithic astronomical complexes, such as the Goseck circle (c. 4900 BC) and Stonehenge (c. 2500 BC), had already been used to mark the solstices, the disc presents this knowledge in the form of a portable object.

Timber circular enclosures with astronomical alignments were also built by the Únětice culture at Pömmelte and Schönebeck in Germany, dating from c. 2300-1900 BC. According to excavators of the Pömmelte site, close similarities with the layout of Stonehenge indicate that both monuments were built by "the same culture" (the Bell Beaker culture) with "the same view of the world". The similarity between Pömmelte and earlier enclosures such as the Goseck Circle may indicate a continuation of traditions dating back to the early Neolithic.

=== Society ===
The archaeologist Harald Meller has suggested that by the 20th-19th centuries BC, the Únětice culture had developed into a type of early state, with dominant rulers supported by armed troops. The creation of the Nebra Disc represented part of this process. It allowed for "an extremely accurate positing of time" and as such represented "the establishment of a new temporal order" by the ruling elite, thereby demonstrating "their claim to state power". The creation of the Disc is thought to be specifically associated with the 'prince' buried in the enormous Bornhöck burial mound in Germany (the largest Bronze Age burial mound in Central Europe) dating from c. 1800 BC.

The archaeologist Euan MacKie suggests that the Nebra Disc and other artefacts such as the Bush Barrow Gold Lozenge from Britain provide evidence for the existence of "a class of astronomer priests" in the Early Bronze Age, which may have already existed in the Neolithic and been responsible for the creation of monuments such as Stonehenge.

According to the Musée d'Archaeologie Nationale, the Nebra Disc evokes "a complex society, undoubtedly strictly hierarchical, with advanced technical and astronomical knowledge, organized around work in the fields".

== Interpretations ==
=== Calendar rule ===
The depiction of the Pleiades on the disc in conjunction with a crescent moon is thought to represent a calendar rule for synchronising solar and lunar calendars, enabling the creation of a lunisolar calendar. This rule is known from an ancient Babylonian collection of texts with the title MUL.APIN, dating from c. 700 BC. According to one of the seven rules in the compendium, a leap month should be added when the Pleiades appear next to a crescent moon a few days old in the spring, as depicted on the disc. This conjunction occurs approximately every three years.

Harald Meller suggests that knowledge of this rule may have come from Babylonia to Central Europe through long-distance trade and contacts, despite it being attested earlier on the Nebra disc than in Babylonia. Baltic amber beads have been found in a foundational deposit under the large ziggurat of Aššur in Iraq dating from c. 1800-1750 BC, indicating that a connection existed between both regions when the Nebra disc was created. However some Assyriologists and astronomers have rejected the comparison of the Nebra Disc with MUL.APIN.

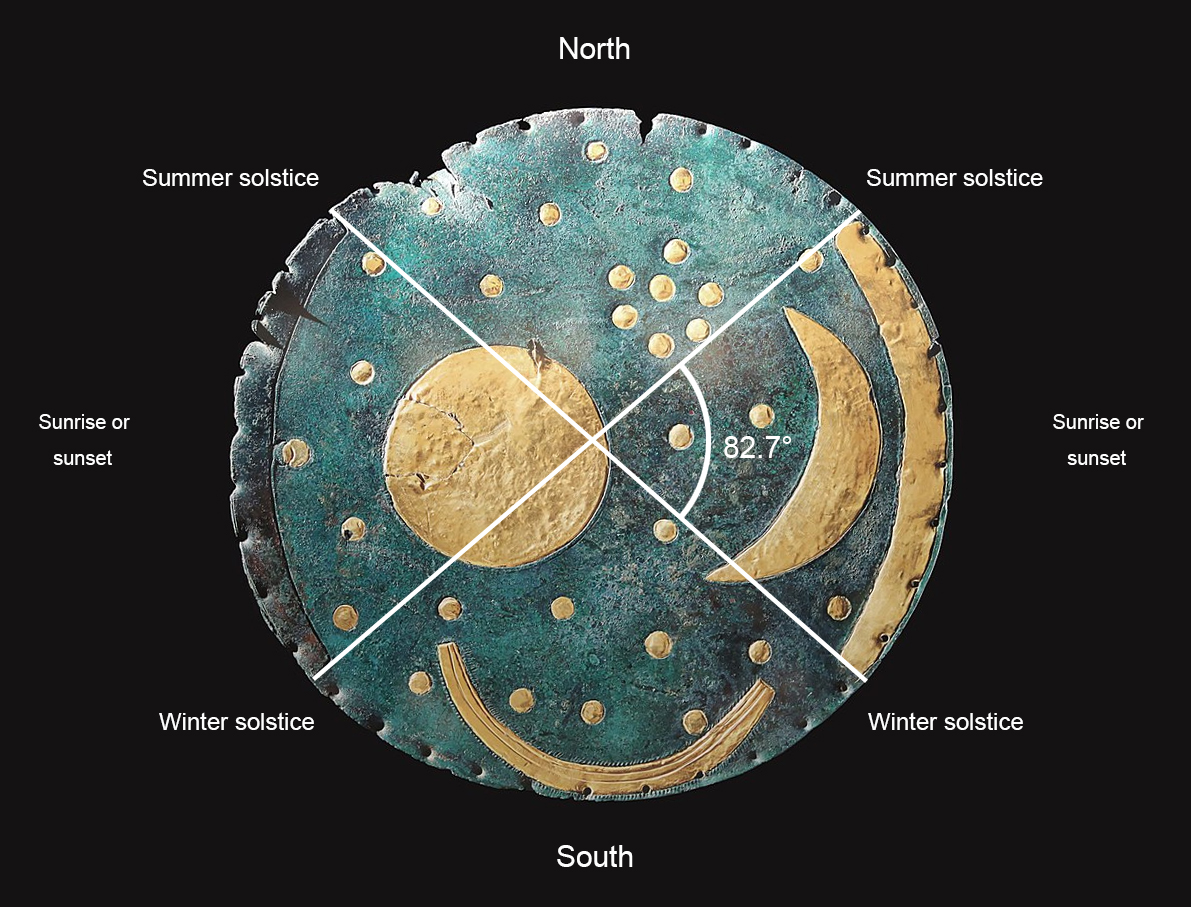
Gold strips on the side of the disc mark the summer and winter solstices, and the top represents the horizon and north. This is opposite to modern star charts which are intended to be held aloft and viewed from below, not like geographic maps where we (imagine we can) look down from above.

The number of stars depicted on the disc (32) is also thought to be significant, possibly encoding the calendar rule numerically. Firstly, the conjunction of lunar crescent and Pleiades depicted on the disc occurs after 32 days following the last "new light" (the first visible crescent moon of the month), and not before. Secondly, because a lunar year (354 days) is eleven days shorter than a solar year (365 days), 32 solar years is equal in length to 33 lunar years (with an error of only two days). That is, 32 x 365 = 11680 days, and 33 x 354 = 11682 days. This 32 solar-year cycle may be represented on the disc by 32 stars, plus the sun (or full moon), adding up to 33.

The archaeologist Christoph Sommerfeld has argued that the disc encodes knowledge of the 19-year lunisolar Metonic cycle. According to Sommerfeld the Metonic cycle is similarly encoded on the disc of the Trundholm sun chariot, dating from c. 1500 BC. The Metonic cycle is also thought to be encoded on the Late Bronze Age Berlin Gold Hat, which features a band of 19 "star and crescent" symbols.

Some authors have argued that the number of pin holes around the rim of the disc (approximately 38 to 40) has an astronomical significance. The exact number is not known due to damage to the disc.

The Nebra Disc has been compared to a passage from the Greek poet Hesiod, written around 700 BC, which describes the role of the Pleiades for organizing the agricultural year:

"When the Pleiades, daughters of Atlas, are rising, begin your harvest, and your ploughing when they are going to set. Forty nights and days they are hidden and appear again as the year moves round, when first you sharpen your sickle. This is the law of the plains, and of those who live near the sea, and who inhabit rich country, the glens and hollows far from the tossing sea,—strip to sow and strip to plough and strip to reap, if you wish to get in all Demeter's fruits in due season, and that each kind may grow in its season."

Depictions of the Pleiades are also known from some rock carvings dating from the early Bronze Age, such as at Mont Bégo in the southern Alps and on a 'Calendar Stone' at Leodagger in Austria, a cult site associated with the Únětice culture. The Nebra Disc has some similarities to petroglyphs from the Nordic Bronze Age, some of which are thought to have a calendrical meaning.

==== Find site ====
The site on the Mittelberg hill where the Nebra disc was found is thought to have served as an enclosed 'sacred precinct', delimited by earthen ramparts on two sides of the hill. From this location, when the disc is aligned to the north, the upper terminus of the western gold arc points towards the Brocken mountain, where the sun is seen to set on the summer solstice (June 21st). Another distinctive marker on the horizon is the Kulpenberg hill, where the sun sets on May 1st (Beltane), a date also marked by an entrance to the Pömmelte enclosure built by the Únětice culture.

=== Mythology ===
The Nebra disc has been described as "the oldest evidence of a complex mythical world picture in Europe." According to the archaeologist Miranda Aldhouse-Green, the Nebra Disc combines symbols of a religious and mythological nature that were part of a "complex European wide belief system".

==== Connections with Greece ====
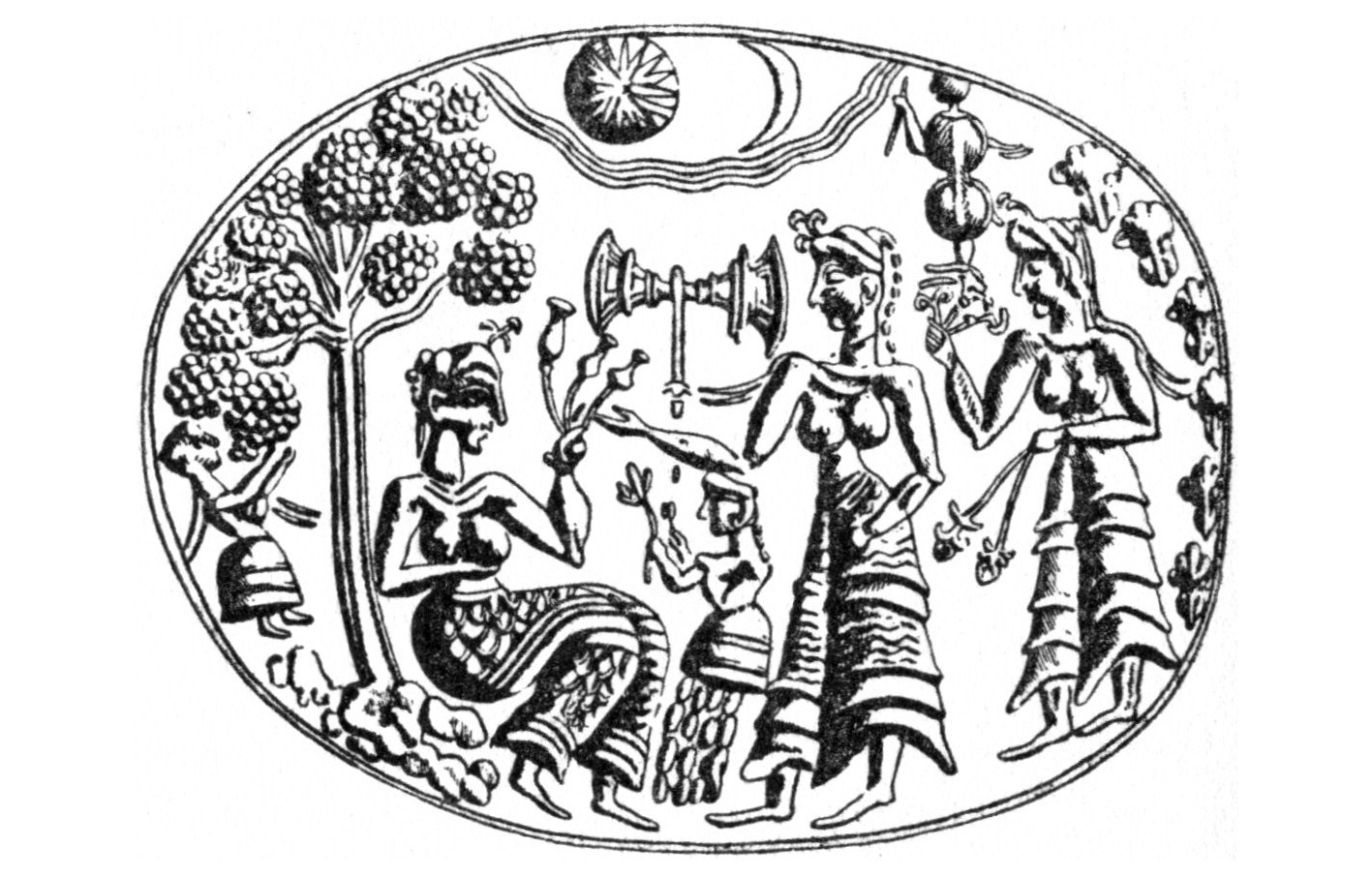
Gold signet ring from Mycenae with similar celestial imagery, fifteenth century BC

A depiction of a sun and crescent moon similar to the Nebra disc appears on a gold signet ring from Mycenae in Greece, dating from the fifteenth century BC. Beneath the sun and moon is a seated female figure holding three opium poppies in her hand, identified as a goddess of nature and fertility, possibly the Minoan poppy goddess, or an early form of the goddess Demeter. The gold arcs on the Nebra disc bear a resemblance to the Minoan double-axe or labrys, which is centrally depicted on the gold signet ring and considered to be the main symbol of the Minoan goddess, as well as a symbol of Demeter.

According to the archaeologist Kristian Kristiansen, imagery similar to that found on Mycenaean signet rings appears in Nordic Bronze Age petroglyphs from the Kivik King's Grave in Sweden, dating from the 16th to 15th centuries BC, whilst Baltic amber has been found in the elite shaft graves at Mycenae, attesting to connections between both regions. Baltic amber probably reached Greece via the Únětice culture. Opium poppy has also been found in settlements of the Únětice culture where it may have been used in cult rituals.

Some researchers have suggested that the Nebra disc was buried after 1600 BC in response to the volcanic eruption on the Minoan island of Thera (Santorini), which devastated the island and created an ash cloud reaching as far as central Europe. This may have darkened the sky for 20 to 25 years, rendering the Nebra disc useless.

==== Solar boat ====
The gold arc at the bottom of the Disc is usually interpreted as a mythological solar boat or sun-ship, which carries the sun through the day and night. The short lines on each side of the gold arc may represent the oars of a large crew. According to the archaeologist Harald Meller this imagery was "hitherto unknown in Europe" and probably originated in Egypt, possibly reaching Central Europe through wide-ranging contacts and travel. In contrast the archaeologist Mary Cahill has argued that sun-ships were already depicted on gold lunulae from the Bell Beaker culture, from which the Únětice culture developed. Solar boats may even be depicted on rock art dating from the Neolithic or earlier, such as at the megalithic sites of Newgrange and Knowth in Ireland.

Solar boats or vessels also appear in later Indo-European traditions: in Latvian folk songs the sun goddess Saulė sleeps through the night in a golden boat, whilst in the Atharvaveda the Sun is twice told ‘O Aditya, thou hast boarded a ship of a hundred oars for well-being’. In Greek mythology the Sun's vessel takes the form of a golden bowl or cup, which may resemble the bowl-like shape of the Nebra boat.

Possibly related artefacts from the later Bronze Age include the ship-like Caergwrle bowl from Wales, which features circular solar symbols embossed in gold. Gold bowls from central and northern Europe, such as from the Eberswalde Hoard in Germany, feature similar circular solar symbols and some of these may contain calendrical information, including the equivalence of 32 solar and 33 lunar years possibly depicted on the Nebra Disc. Circular solar symbols also appear on a hoard of nearly one hundred miniature gold boats from Nors in Denmark, dating from 1700-1100 BC, which are thought to represent solar boats.

Numerous other depictions of solar boats appear in Nordic Bronze Age art dating from circa 1600 BC onwards, often in the form of petroglyphs or engraved images on bronze razors. Some petroglyphs show figures performing backward bends or backward leaps over ships, and a bronze figurine depicts a female in a similar pose. The archaeologist Rune Iversen has connected these to similar depictions from Egypt, which show backward-bend dances performed for the cow goddess Hathor. In Minoan frescoes from Crete and at Avaris in Egypt figures are similarly shown performing backward leaps over bulls. According to Iversen this shared imagery forms part of "the manifold exchange of cultural ideas and beliefs that took place among Egypt, the Aegean and Central and Northern Europe during the second and first millennium BC."

The Nordic depictions may be related to a later account from the Roman historian Tacitus, who stated that the Germanic Suebi worshipped the goddess Isis in the form of a ship. Isis was equated with Hathor from the New Kingdom onwards, and both goddesses were associated with the solar barque (the Egyptian solar boat), often being depicted at the prow of the ship. Both were also identified with the goddess Demeter by the later Greeks.

The historians Joseph S. Hopkins and Haukur Þorgeirsson have connected Tacitus' 'Isis of the Suebi' with the Norse goddess Freyja, arguing for a strong association between Freyja and ship imagery within Old Norse texts, and particularly with the stone ships of Scandinavia. Both Freyja and her twin brother Freyr have characteristics associated with solar gods, including the golden ship Skíðblaðnir belonging to Freyr, which may represent a solar boat.

==== Twin gods ====
According to Kristian Kristiansen the pairs of swords, axes and spiral bracelets deposited with the Nebra Disc represent the mythological Divine Twins known from various Indo-European traditions, such as the Dioscuri in Greece, the Ašvieniai in Lithuania, the Ashvins in India, and the Alcis in Germany. Similar depositions are known from a number of other Bronze Age burials. Kristiansen further suggests that the constellation of Gemini, which is associated with the Dioscuri, might be represented in the lower part of the Disc next to the solar boat. The Divine Twins are also thought to be represented in Nordic Bronze Age iconography, rock art and bronze figurines, where they often appear in association with ships.

Some ancient Greek and Roman authors, such as Diodorus Siculus and Tacitus, specifically linked worship of the Divine Twins to northern peoples. In his description of a journey made by the Argonauts from the Black Sea up to the northern ocean, Diodorus writes:

"the Celts who dwell along the ocean venerate the Dioscori above any of the gods, since they have a tradition handed down from ancient times that these gods appeared among them coming from the ocean. Moreover, the country which skirts the ocean bears, they say, not a few names which are derived from the Argonauts and the Dioscori."

The archeologist Timothy Darvill has suggested a connection between the Nebra Disc and its associated paired objects with the trilithons at Stonehenge, which may also represent an early form of the Divine Twins. According to Darvill the central trilithon of Stonehenge may have embodied "a pair of deities representing day and night, the sun and moon, summer and winter, life and death, perhaps even the prehistoric equivalents of the twins Apollo and Artemis as they are known in later pantheons across the Old World." Darvill suggests that the Nebra Disc represents "an evolution onwards from Stonehenge".

In ancient Greece Apollo and Artemis were associated with the sun and the moon respectively, whilst the Pleiades were known as 'the companions of Artemis', echoing the depiction on the Nebra Disc. According to the Greek historian Herodotus, ancient Egyptians maintained that Apollo and Artemis were in fact the children of Isis, equivalent to the gods Horus and Bubastis, and that Isis was the same as Demeter. Apollo was also equated with the Celtic god Belenus in antiquity, whose associated festival of Beltane was apparently marked by the Pömmelte enclosure in Germany.

==== Serpents ====
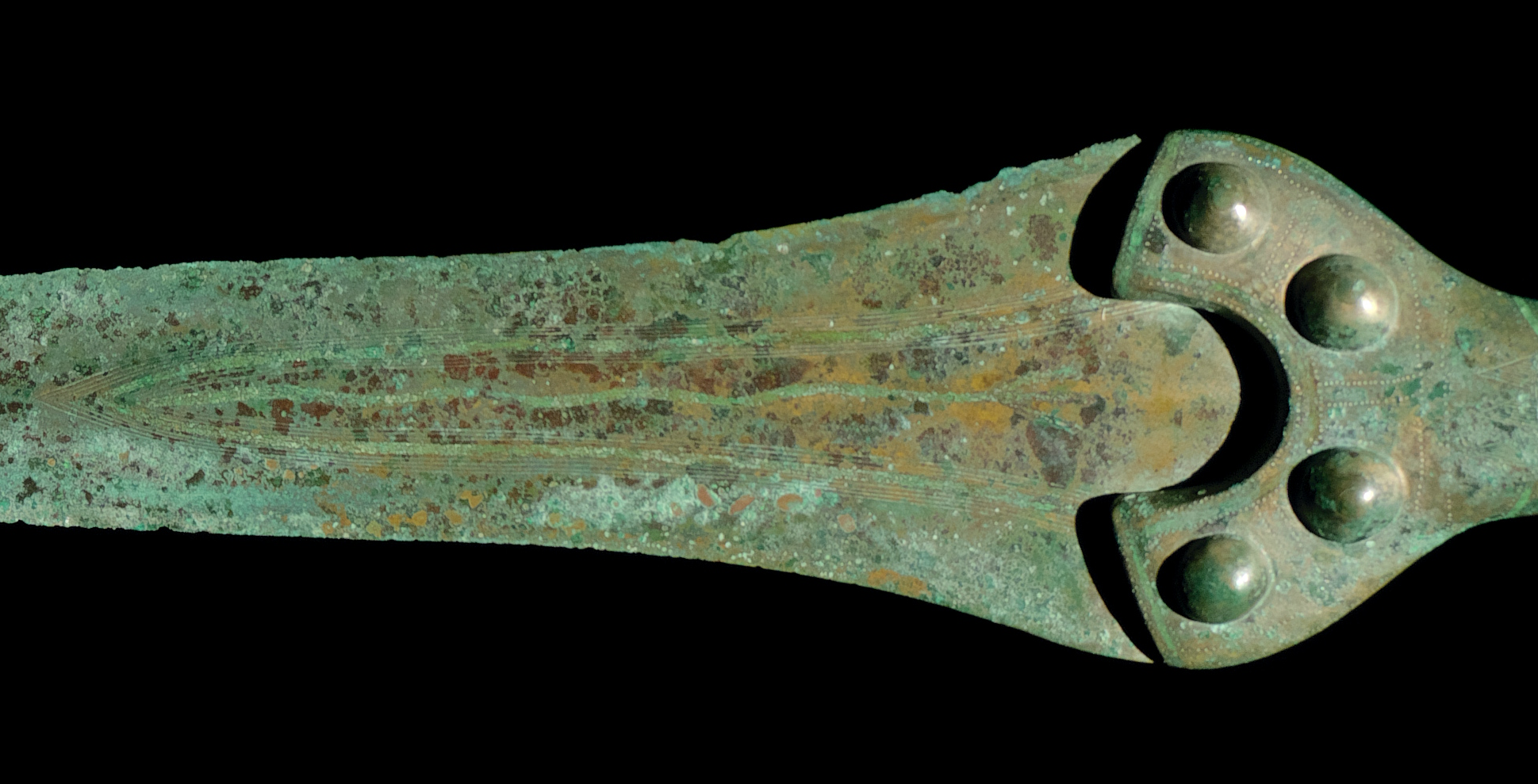
Detail of one of the swords buried with the Nebra disc

One of the swords buried with the Nebra disc features an undulating linear form inlaid with copper on the midrib of the blade which may represent a three-headed snake or serpent. Harald Meller suggests the sword would have allowed the 'prince' who bore it to present himself as a "snake-conquering hero", which Meller relates to the myth of Heracles strangling snakes as an infant. Serpent-slaying myths, often featuring a three-headed serpent, are common in Indo-European mythologies and thought to share a proto-Indo-European origin. Examples include Thor slaying Jörmungandr, Zeus slaying Typhon, and Indra slaying Vritra. A slightly altered version also appears in the myth of Apollo slaying Python before establishing his oracle at Delphi. Meller suggests that the Nebra hoard, with its depictions of the sun, ship, and serpents "contains all the elements of a mythological narrative that was entirely new to central Europe but which would be depicted thousands of times centuries later in the visual world of the Nordic Bronze Age, above all in rock art."

=== Connections with Britain ===
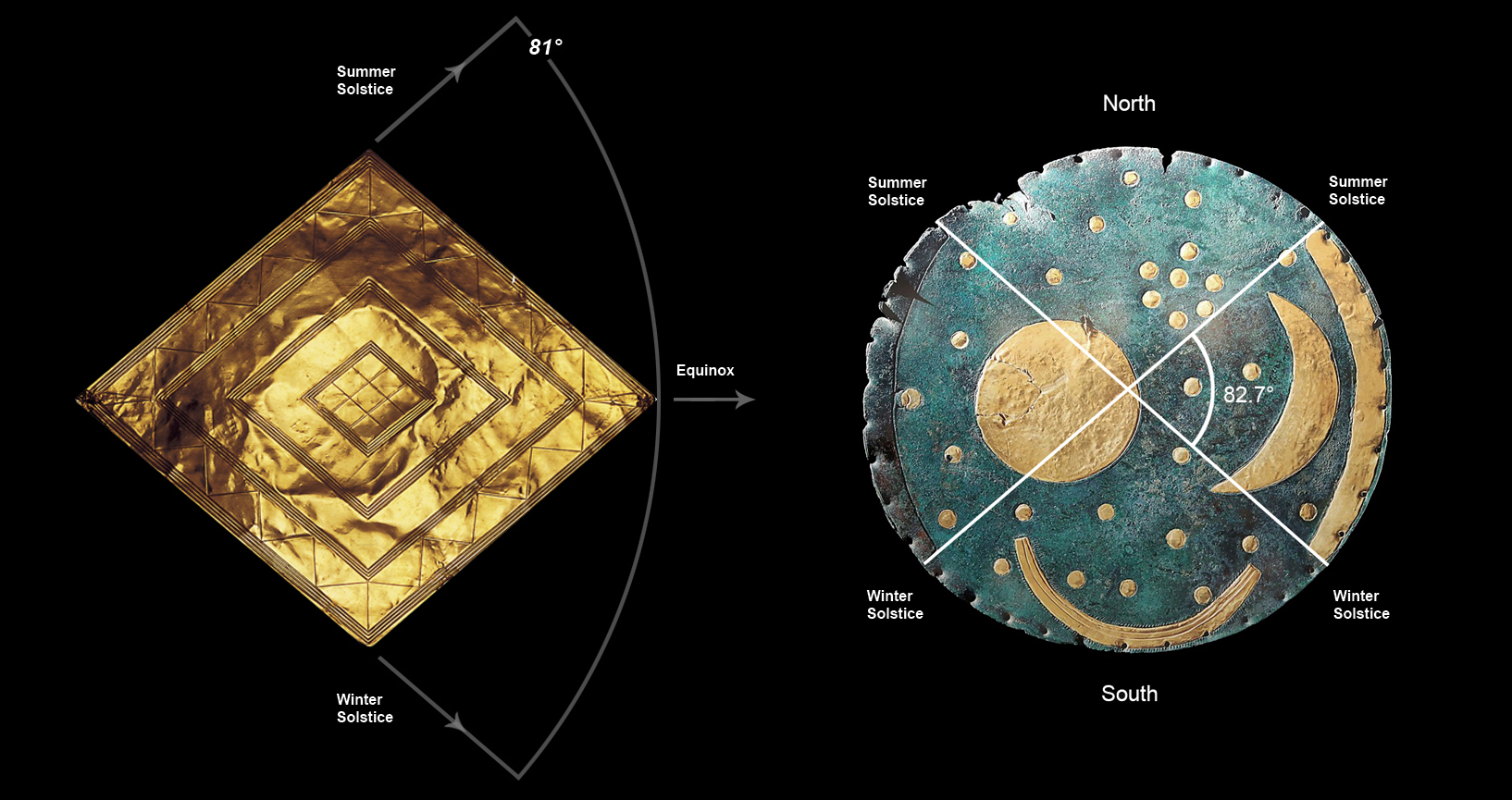
Comparison of the Bush Barrow lozenge and Nebra sky disc

Similarities and connections have been noted between the Nebra disc and the gold lozenge from Bush Barrow, an elite burial located next to Stonehenge dating from c. 1900 BC. The geometric design of the Bush Barrow lozenge corresponds to the angle between midsummer and midwinter sunrises at the latitude of Stonehenge (51°N) in a similar manner to the gold arcs on the Nebra disc, which was buried at a similar latitude. According to Euan MacKie (2009) "The Nebra disc and the Bush Barrow lozenge both seem to be designed to reflect the annual solar cycle at about latitude 51° north." MacKie further suggests that both the Nebra disc and Bush Barrow lozenge may be linked to the solar calendar reconstructed by Alexander Thom from his analysis of standing stone alignments in Britain. The researcher Claude Maumené has argued that a Venus calendar may also be encoded on the Bush Barrow lozenge.

Both the Nebra sky disc and Bush Barrow lozenge were made with gold from Cornwall, providing a direct link between them. According to the archaeologist Sabine Gerloff the gold plating technique used on the Nebra sky disc also originated in Britain, and was introduced from there to the continent.

== Authenticity ==
There were some initial suspicions that the disc might be an archaeological forgery. Peter Schauer of the University of Regensburg, Germany, argued in 2005 that the Nebra disc was a fake and that he could prove that the patina of the disc could have been created with urine, hydrochloric acid, and a blow torch within a short amount of time. He had to admit in court that he had never held the disc in his own hands, unlike the eighteen scientists who had examined the disc. Scientific analyses of the patina (or corrosion layer) have since confirmed its authenticity.

Richard Harrison, professor of European prehistory at the University of Bristol, stated in a BBC documentary that "When I first heard about the Nebra Disc I thought it was a joke, indeed I thought it was a forgery", due to the extraordinary nature of the find, although he had not seen the sky disc at the time. The same documentary presented scientific analyses confirming the authenticity of the disc.

A paper published in 2020 by Rupert Gebhard and Rudiger Krause questioned the Early Bronze Age dating of the Nebra disc and proposed a later Iron Age date instead. A response paper was published in the same year by Ernst Pernicka and colleagues, rejecting the arguments of Gebhard and Krause. Scientific analyses of the disc, the items found with the disc, and the find spot have all confirmed the Early Bronze Age dating.

== Exhibition ==
The disc was the centre of an exhibition entitled Der geschmiedete Himmel (German "The forged sky"), showing 1,600 Bronze Age artefacts, including the Trundholm sun chariot, shown at Halle from 15 October 2004 to 22 May 2005, from 1 July to 22 October 2005 in Copenhagen, from 9 November 2005 to 5 February 2006 in Vienna, from 10 March to 16 July 2006 in Mannheim, and from 29 September 2006 to 25 February 2007 in Basel.

On 21 June 2007, a multimedia visitor centre was opened near the discovery site at Nebra.

The disc is part of the permanent exhibition in the Halle State Museum of Prehistory (Landesmuseum für Vorgeschichte) in Halle.

The disc was on display at the British Museum in London as part of The World Of Stonehenge Exhibition from 17 February to 17 July 2022. The disc was on display at the Drents Museum in Assen from 6 August to 18 September 2022.

=== Nebra Sky Disc commemorative 10 Euro coin (2008) ===
Germany 10 Euro 2008 Nebra Sky Disc silver coin

The Nebra Sky Disc commemorative 10 Euro coin is a silver coin issued by the Federal Republic of Germany in 2008 to celebrate the discovery of the Nebra sky disc (Himmelsscheibe von Nebra), one of the most important archaeological finds of the 21st century. Struck from .925 sterling silver at the Berlin Mint (indicated by the mintmark "A"), the coin was designed by the prominent artist and medalist Bodo Broschat. The obverse displays a detailed, realistic depiction of the Nebra sky disc on a central pedestal, showing its full moon, crescent moon, and star clusters, flanked by an additional full moon on the left and a crescent on the right, all encircled by the inscription "HIMMELSSCHEIBE VON NEBRA" and the artist's initials (BB). The reverse features the official German Federal Eagle surrounded by the twelve stars of the European Union, with the face value "10 EURO", the mintmark "A", and the year of minting placed below. The issuing country name is divided across the top and bottom with the inscription "BUNDESREPUBLIK DEUTSCHLAND". The coin's edge features the incuse inscription "DER GESCHMIEDETE HIMMEL IM HERZEN EUROPAS" (The Forged Sky in the Heart of Europe).

== Replica on the ISS ==
In November 2021, a replica of the Nebra Sky Disc was launched to the International Space Station on the Crew-3 mission, taken by German astronaut Matthias Maurer. Maurer, who was part of the European mission Cosmic Kiss, designed the mission's patch with inspiration from the Nebra Sky Disk, as well as the Pioneer plaques and Voyager Golden Records that were sent into the unknown carrying messages from Earth.

== Legal issues ==
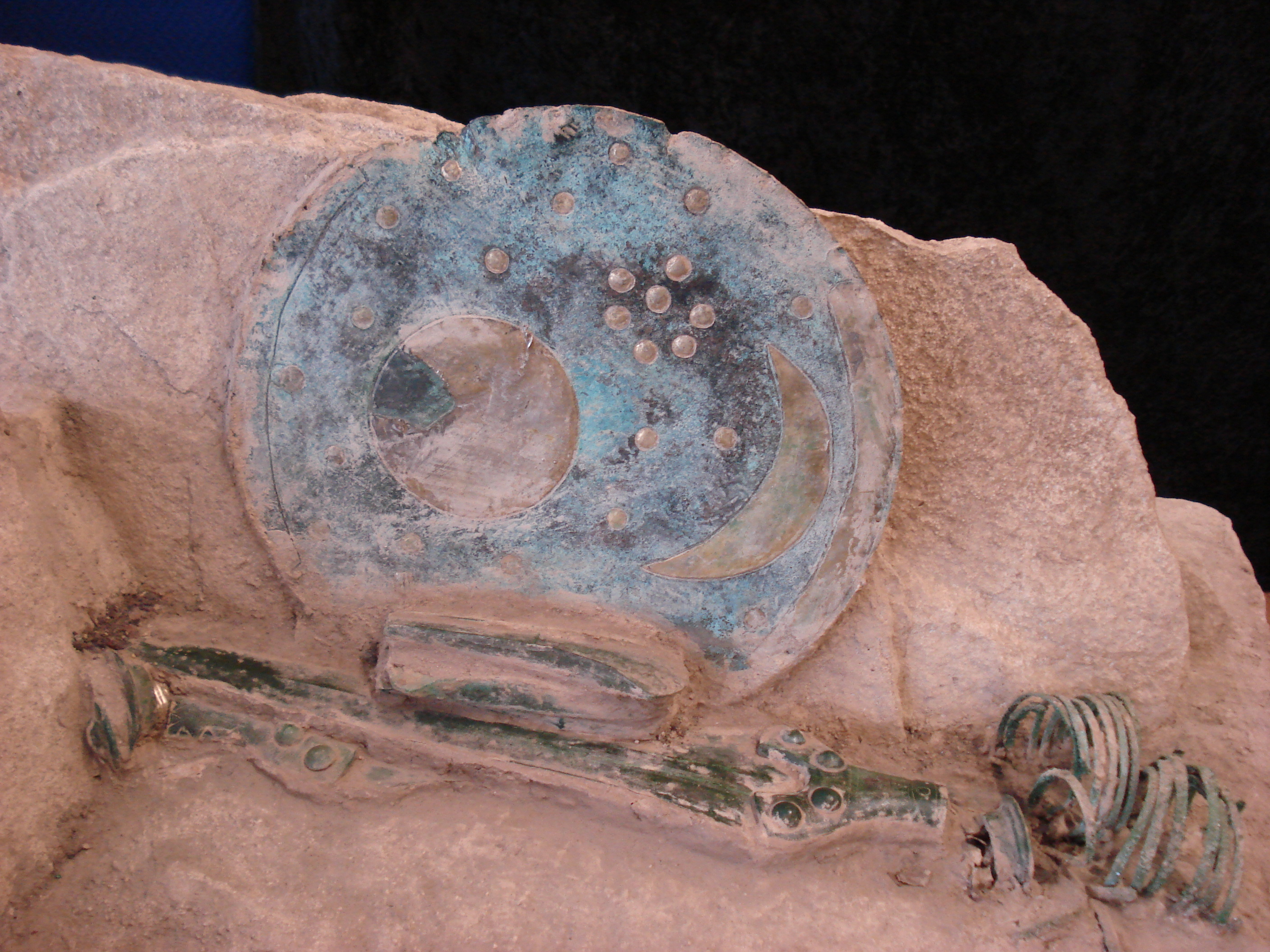
Replica of the find situation of the Nebra Sky Disc for the German exhibition Der geschmiedete Himmel (German "The forged sky")

The state of Saxony-Anhalt registered the disc as a trademark, which resulted in two lawsuits. In 2003, Saxony-Anhalt successfully sued the city of Querfurt for depicting the disc design on souvenirs. Saxony-Anhalt also successfully sued the publishing houses Piper and Heyne over an abstract depiction of the disc on book covers. The Magdeburg court assessed the case's relevance according to German copyright law.

The defenders argued that as a cult object, the disc had already been "published" approximately 3,500 years earlier in the Bronze Age and that consequently, all protection of intellectual property associated with it has long expired. The plaintiff, on the other hand, argued that the editio princeps of the disc is recent, and according to German law protected for 25 years, until 2027. Another argument concerned the question of whether a notable work of art may be registered as a trademark in the first place. The Magdeburg court decided in favour of the State of Saxony-Anhalt.

The case was appealed and on the basis of decisions from the Oberlandesgericht Düsseldorf in 2005 and the Federal Court of Justice in 2009, the initial ruling was overturned and the German Patent and Trademark Office withdrew the trademark rights. Thereafter, the state of Saxony-Anhalt registered the design of the disc as a trademark with the European Union Intellectual Property Office.

In 2023, the state of Saxony-Anhalt filed a DMCA take down notice requesting removal of nine images of the Nebra sky disc from Wikimedia Commons, asserting that they were the "owner of the exclusive copyright in the Sky Disk of Nebra". Wikimedia Deutschland, a chapter of the Wikimedia Foundation, subsequently filed a DMCA counter-notice stating that since the implementation of Article 14 of the Directive 2019/790 of the European Parliament, there can be no such copyrights on reproductions of visual works that are in the public domain.

== Gallery ==
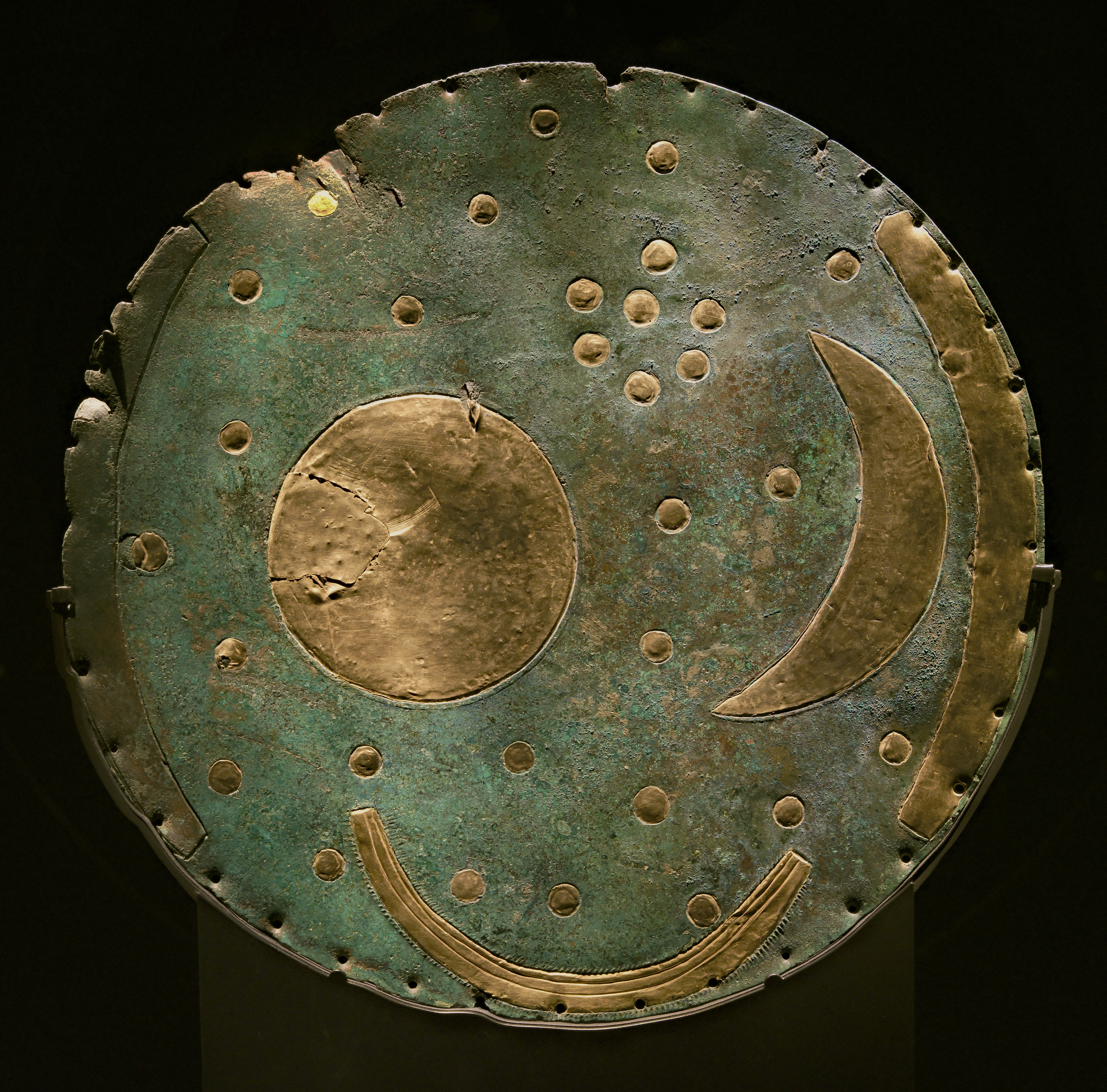
Photo of the Nebra disc on display at the Halle State Museum of Prehistory

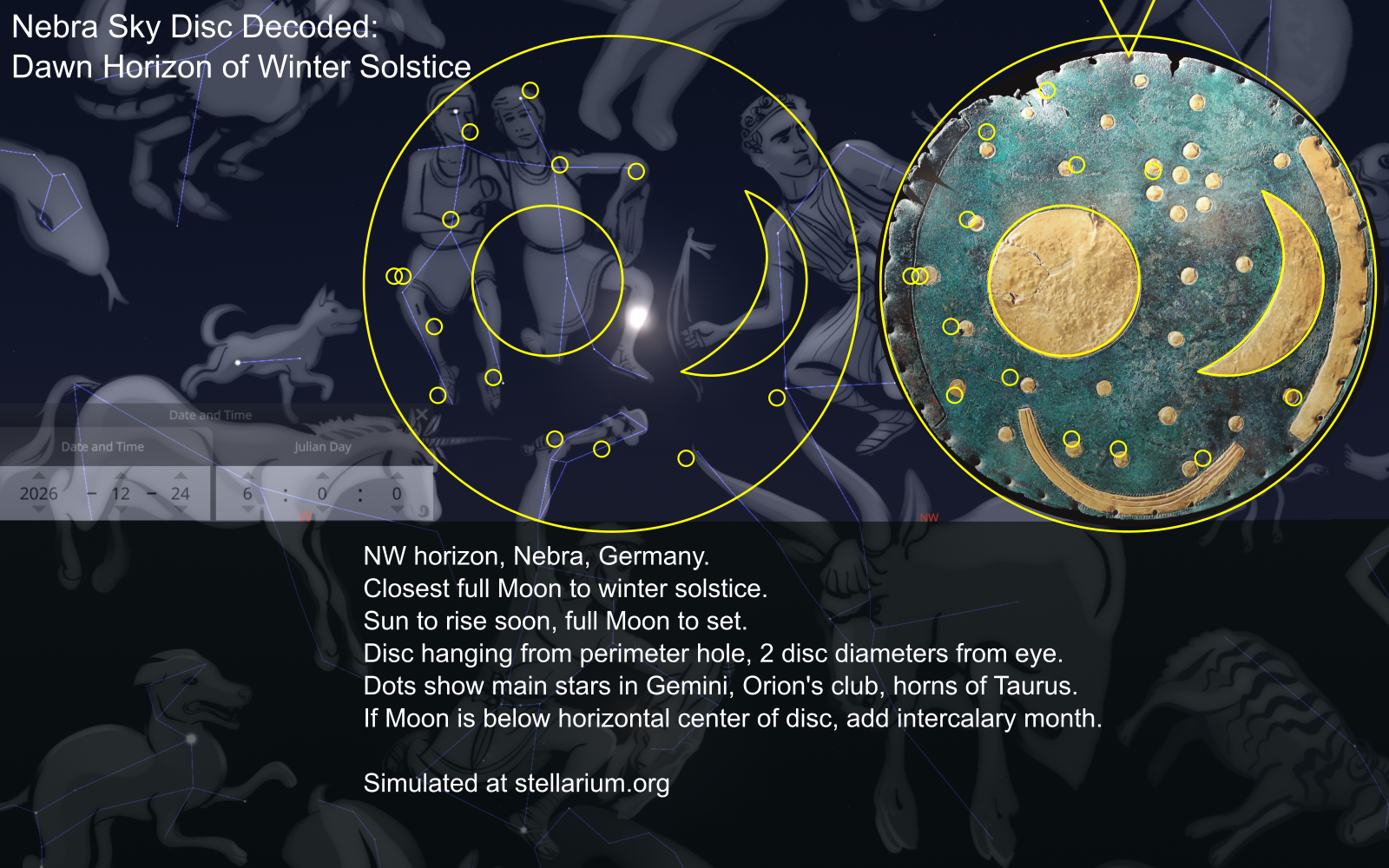
The Sky Disc at dawn near winter solstice

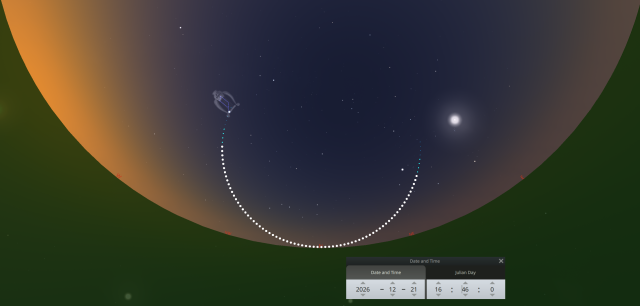
Path of Vega at winter solstice, as seen from 51°N

== See also ==
- Bush Barrow – Bronze age site in Wiltshire, England
- Bell Beaker culture
- Golden hat – Bronze Age Europe artefacts
- Rillaton Barrow – Barrow in Cornwall
- Mold gold cape – Solid sheet-gold object from the British Bronze Age
- Trundholm sun chariot – Late Nordic Bronze Age artifact discovered in Denmark
- Tumulus culture – Prehistoric European culture characterized by burial mounds
- Antikythera mechanism – Ancient Greek analogue astronomical computer
- Tal-Qadi Temple – Megalithic temple in Malta – The Tal-Qadi Sky Tablet
