= Barby, Germany =

Barby
- Town
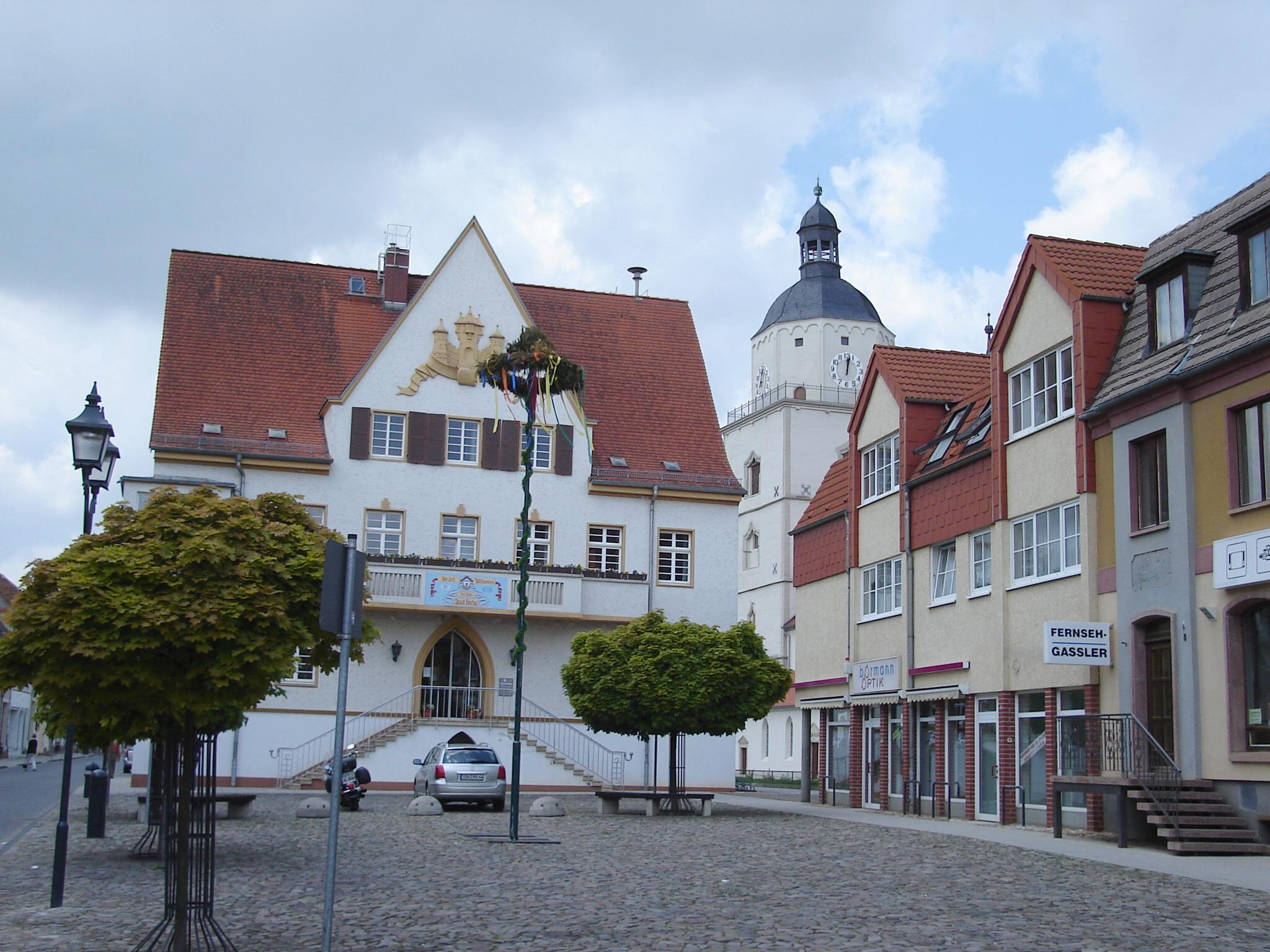
- Town hall

- Coat of arms

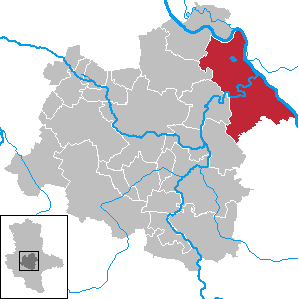
- Location of Barby within Salzlandkreis district
- Interactive map of Barby
- Location within Germany Location within Saxony-Anhalt
- Coordinates: 51°58′N 11°52′E
- Country: Germany
- State: Saxony-Anhalt
- District: Salzlandkreis

Government
  - Mayor (2023–30): Jörn Weinert (CDU)

Area
  - Total: 152.76 km^{2} (58.98 sq mi)
- Elevation: 51 m (167 ft)

Population (2025-12-31)
  - Total: 7,803
  - Density: 51.08/km^{2} (132.3/sq mi)
- Time zone: UTC+01:00 (CET)
  - Summer (DST): UTC+02:00 (CEST)
- Postal codes: 39249
- Dialling codes: 039298
- Vehicle registration: SLK
- Website: www.stadt-barby.de

Barby (German pronunciation: [ˈbaʁbiː]) is a town in the Salzlandkreis district, in Saxony-Anhalt, Germany. It is situated on the left bank of the River Elbe, near the confluence with the Saale, approx. 25 km (16 mi) southeast of Magdeburg. Since an administrative reform of 1 January 2010 it comprises the former municipalities of the Verwaltungsgemeinschaft Elbe-Saale, except for Gnadau, that joined Barby in September 2010. The Barby Ferry, a reaction ferry across the Elbe, links Barby with Zerbst-Walternienburg.

== Geography ==
The town Barby consists of the following Ortschaften or municipal divisions:

- Barby
- Breitenhagen
- Glinde
- Gnadau
- Groß Rosenburg
- Lödderitz
- Pömmelte
- Sachsendorf
- Tornitz
- Wespen
- Zuchau

== History ==
In 1295, Adolf King of the Romans granted a privilege to Albert, lord of Barby, to collect the imperial tax levied upon the Jews living in Barby at the time.

== Twin towns ==
Barby is twinned with:

- Schöppenstedt, Germany
- Aukštadvaris, Lithuania
- Pruchnik, Poland

== Notable people ==
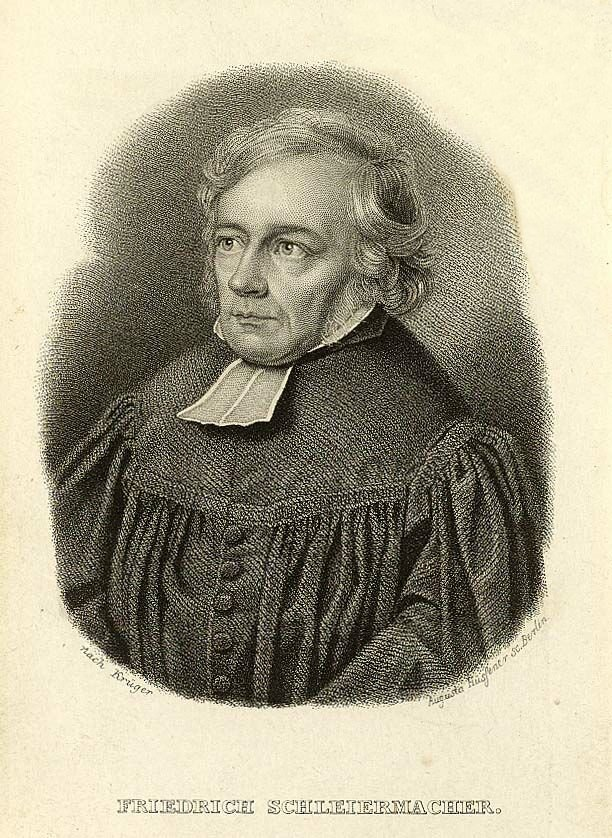
Friedrich Schleiermacher

- Friedrich Schleiermacher (1768–1843), theologian and philosopher
- Jakob Friedrich Fries (1773–1843), philosopher
- Max Sering (1857–1939), economist
- Gottfried Wehling (1862–1913), architect
- Walter Conrad (1892–1970), jurist and politician (FDP)
- Albrecht Schöne (1925–2025), Germanist
