= Max Sering =

German economist

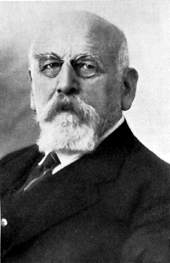
- Max Sering in 1933
- Born: 18 January 1857; Barby
- Died: 12 November 1939 (aged 82); Berlin

Academic background
- Education: University of Strasbourg
- Doctoral advisor: Gustav von Schmoller

Academic work
- Discipline: Agricultural economics

Max Sering (18 January 1857 – 12 November 1939) was a German economist. Sering was considered the most famous German agricultural economist of his time; his students briefly included Otto von Habsburg.

Sering studied in both Strasbourg and Leipzig, before entering the civil service in Alsace in 1879. In 1883 he was sent by the Prussian government to North America to study agricultural competition.

Sering remarked that the Russian Revolution served to further enhance the transition of peasant land from common ownership to private ownership.
