= Sachsendorf (b Calbe) station =

Railway station in Germany

Sachsendorf (bei Calbe)
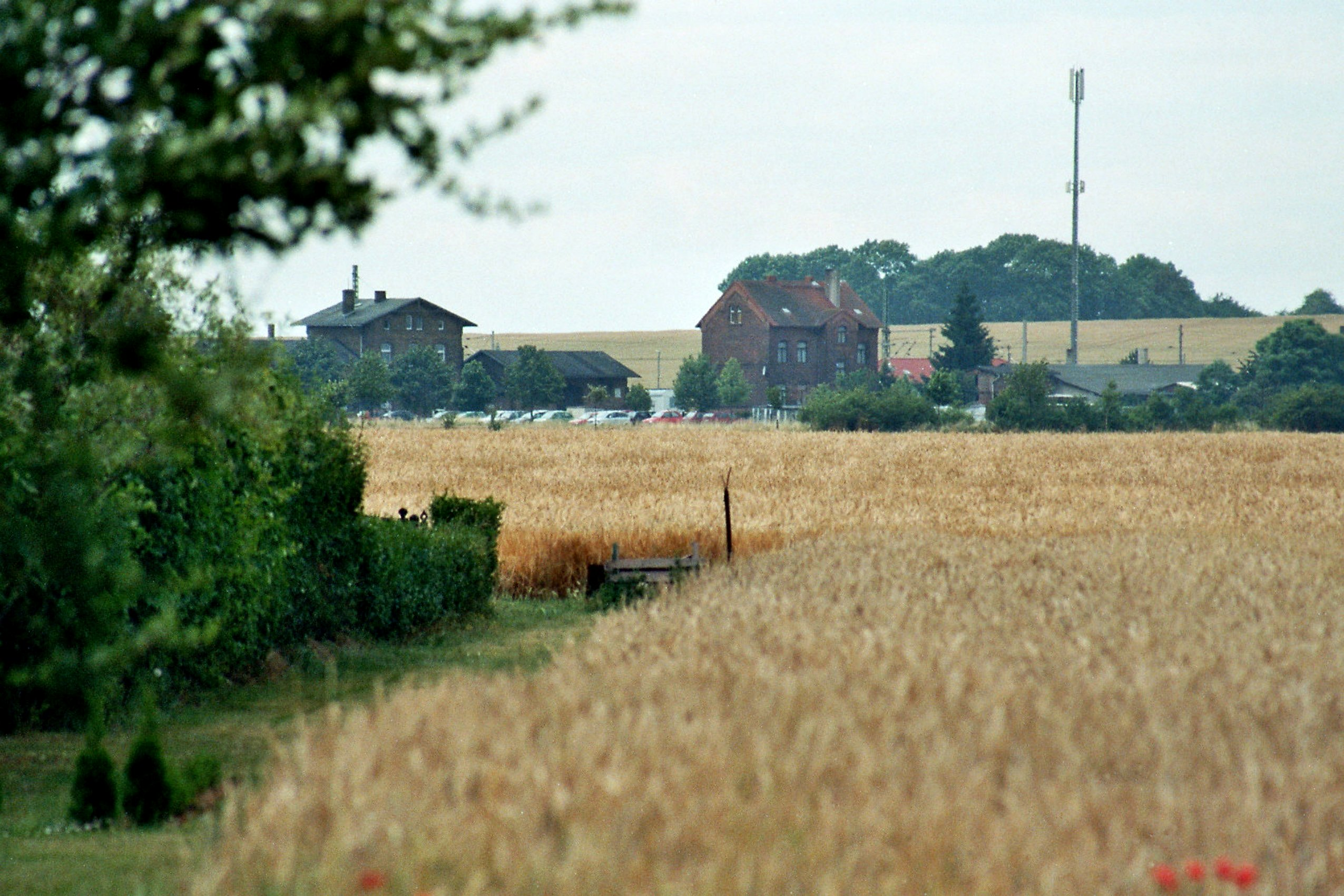
- 2005

General information
- Location: Am Bahnhof 1; 39240 Sachsendorf; Saxony-Anhalt; Germany
- Coordinates: 51.8709°N 11.8650°E
- System: Bf
- Owner: Deutsche Bahn
- Operator: DB Station&Service
- Lines: Magdeburg–Leipzig railway (KBS 340)
- Platforms: 2 side platforms
- Tracks: 2
- Train operators: DB Regio Südost
- Connections: RE 30; 136

Construction
- Parking: yes
- Cycle facilities: no
- Accessible: yes

Other information
- Station code: 5465
- DS100 code: LSAD
- IBNR: 8012830
- Category: 6
- Fare zone: marego: 617
- Website: www.bahnhof.de

Services
Preceding station	DB Regio Südost	Following station
Calbe (Saale) Ost towards Magdeburg Hbf	RE 30	Wulfen towards Halle (Saale) Hbf
Location
- Location within Saxony-Anhalt Location within Germany Location within Europe

Sachsendorf (bei Calbe) station is a railway station in the municipality of Sachsendorf, located in the Salzlandkreis district in Saxony-Anhalt, Germany.
