= Groß Rosenburg =

- Stadtteil of Barby
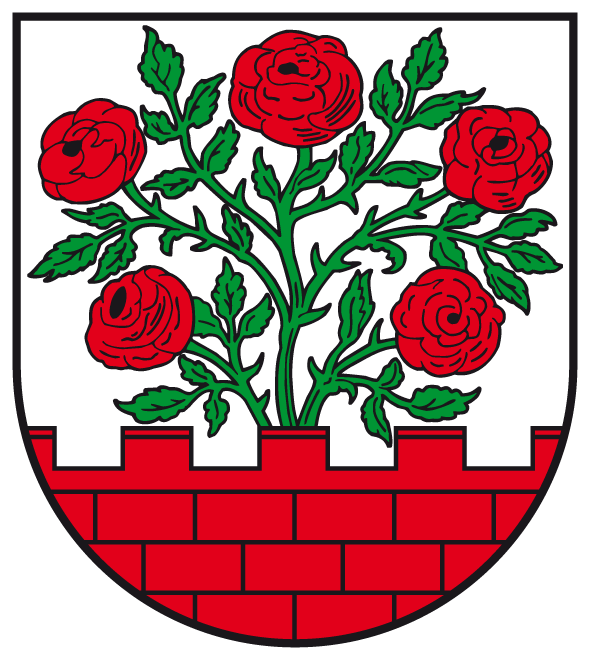
- Coat of arms
- Interactive map of Groß Rosenburg
- Location within Germany Location within Saxony-Anhalt
- Coordinates: 51°54′56″N 11°53′11″E
- Country: Germany
- State: Saxony-Anhalt
- District: Salzlandkreis
- Town: Barby

Area
  - Total: 25.91 km^{2} (10.00 sq mi)
- Elevation: 51 m (167 ft)

Population (2006-12-31)
  - Total: 1,756
  - Density: 67.77/km^{2} (175.5/sq mi)
- Time zone: UTC+01:00 (CET)
  - Summer (DST): UTC+02:00 (CEST)
- Postal codes: 39240
- Dialling codes: 039294

Groß Rosenburg is a village and a former municipality in the district Salzlandkreis, in Saxony-Anhalt, Germany.

Since 1 January 2010, it is part of the town Barby.
