= Gnadau =

- Stadtteil of Barby
- Interactive map of Gnadau
- Location within Germany Location within Saxony-Anhalt
- Coordinates: 51°58′N 11°47′E
- Country: Germany
- State: Saxony-Anhalt
- District: Salzlandkreis
- Town: Barby

Area
  - Total: 3.63 km^{2} (1.40 sq mi)
- Elevation: 49 m (161 ft)

Population (2009-12-31)
  - Total: 523
  - Density: 144/km^{2} (373/sq mi)
- Time zone: UTC+01:00 (CET)
  - Summer (DST): UTC+02:00 (CEST)
- Postal codes: 39249
- Dialling codes: 03928
- Vehicle registration: SLK
- Website: www.stadt-barby.de

Gnadau is a village and a former municipality in the district Salzlandkreis, in Saxony-Anhalt, Germany. Since 1 September 2010, it is part of the town Barby. It was founded as a settlement of the Moravian Church (Herrnhuter Brüdergemeine) in the 1767 and is seat of a number of diaconal institutions. The name means "Meadow of Grace".
