= Tornitz =

- Stadtteil of Barby
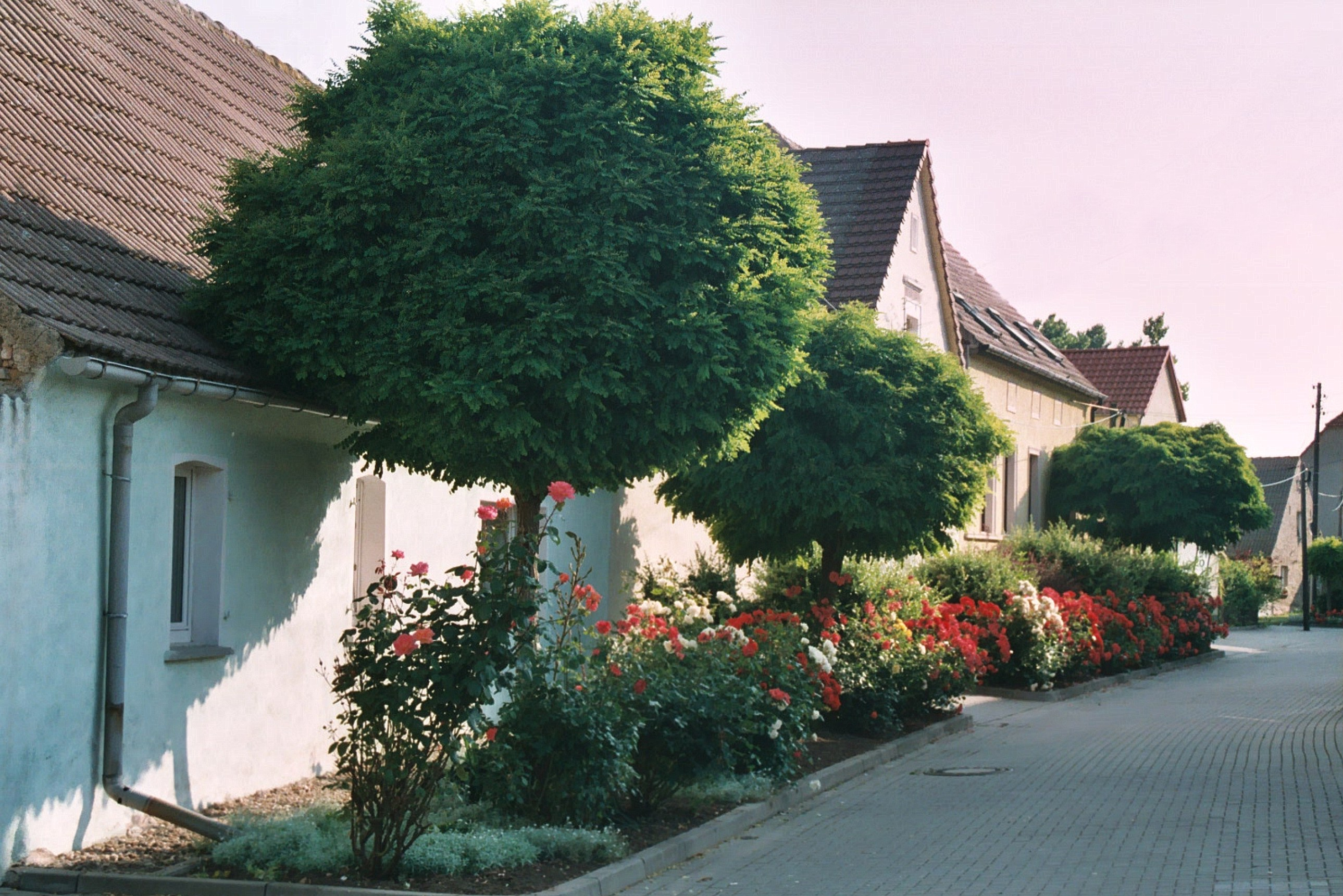
- Interactive map of Tornitz
- Location within Germany Location within Saxony-Anhalt
- Coordinates: 51°55′44″N 11°50′46″E
- Country: Germany
- State: Saxony-Anhalt
- District: Salzlandkreis
- Town: Barby

Area
  - Total: 11.66 km^{2} (4.50 sq mi)
- Elevation: 52 m (171 ft)

Population (2006-12-31)
  - Total: 590
  - Density: 51/km^{2} (130/sq mi)
- Time zone: UTC+01:00 (CET)
  - Summer (DST): UTC+02:00 (CEST)
- Postal codes: 39249
- Dialling codes: 039298
- Website: www.stadt-barby.de/gem/tornitz.html

Tornitz is a village and a former municipality in the district Salzlandkreis, in Saxony-Anhalt, Germany.

Since 1 January 2010, it is part of the town Barby.
