= Wespen =

- Stadtteil of Barby
- Coat of arms
- Interactive map of Wespen
- Location within Germany Location within Saxony-Anhalt
- Coordinates: 51°57′36″N 11°49′38″E
- Country: Germany
- State: Saxony-Anhalt
- District: Salzlandkreis
- Town: Barby

Area
  - Total: 2.68 km^{2} (1.03 sq mi)
- Elevation: 51 m (167 ft)

Population (2006-12-31)
  - Total: 238
  - Density: 88.8/km^{2} (230/sq mi)
- Time zone: UTC+01:00 (CET)
  - Summer (DST): UTC+02:00 (CEST)
- Postal codes: 39249
- Dialling codes: 039298
- Website: www.stadt-barby.de

Wespen is a village and a former municipality in the district Salzlandkreis, in Saxony-Anhalt, Germany.

Since 1 January 2010, it is part of the town Barby.
