= Zuchau =

- Stadtteil of Barby
- Interactive map of Zuchau
- Location within Germany Location within Saxony-Anhalt
- Coordinates: 51°51′14″N 11°51′19″E
- Country: Germany
- State: Saxony-Anhalt
- District: Salzlandkreis
- Town: Barby

Area
  - Total: 10.46 km^{2} (4.04 sq mi)
- Elevation: 68 m (223 ft)

Population (2006-12-31)
  - Total: 339
  - Density: 32.4/km^{2} (83.9/sq mi)
- Time zone: UTC+01:00 (CET)
  - Summer (DST): UTC+02:00 (CEST)
- Postal codes: 39240
- Dialling codes: 039295
- Website: www.stadt-barby.de

Zuchau is a village and a former municipality in the district Salzlandkreis, in Saxony-Anhalt, Germany.

Since 1 January 2010, it is part of the town Barby.
