= Breitenhagen =

Village in Salzlandkreis, Saxony-Anhalt, Germany

- Stadtteil of Barby
- Interactive map of Breitenhagen
- Location within Germany Location within Saxony-Anhalt
- Coordinates: 51°55′22″N 11°57′2″E
- Country: Germany
- State: Saxony-Anhalt
- District: Salzlandkreis
- Town: Barby

Area
  - Total: 11.06 km^{2} (4.27 sq mi)
- Elevation: 52 m (171 ft)

Population (2006-12-31)
  - Total: 509
  - Density: 46.0/km^{2} (119/sq mi)
- Time zone: UTC+01:00 (CET)
  - Summer (DST): UTC+02:00 (CEST)
- Postal codes: 39240
- Dialling codes: 039294
- Website: www.gemeinde-breitenhagen.de

Breitenhagen is a village and a former municipality in the district Salzlandkreis, Saxony-Anhalt, Germany. It is part of the town of Barby since 1 January 2010. As of 2006, the population of Breitenhagen was 509 people, with a population density of 46 people per kilometer square.

== History ==
The village of Breitenhagen is over 750 years old. The village church of St. Christophoros at the center of the village was built in 1625 from quarry stone. It was rebuilt in 1725.

Until 1914, a shipyard existed in Breitenhagen where barges were constructed on the Elbe. The final example of this type of vessel, the Marie-Gerda, is now a restaurant ship moored on the riverbank.

In June 2013, the dam at Breitenhagen collapsed approximately 150 metres behind the pumping station, spanning a length of approximately 100 metres. As a consequence, the floodwater reached as far as Aken. An area of approximately the size of Lake Constance was flooded, with the volume of water equalling that of the Rappbode Dam. The villages of Breitenhagen, Klein Rosenburg, Groß Rosenburg, Lödderitz, Rajoch, Kühren, Diebzig, Susigke and parts of Sachsendorf and Aken were significantly impacted. Some residents were only able to return to their uninhabitable homes after three weeks. In July 2013, the THW attempted to enlarge the breach in order to relieve the flooded areas and channel the water back into the Elbe. This was only possible through the use of an excavator.
