= Lödderitz =

- Stadtteil of Barby
- Interactive map of Lödderitz
- Location within Germany Location within Saxony-Anhalt
- Coordinates: 51°53′3″N 11°57′15″E
- Country: Germany
- State: Saxony-Anhalt
- District: Salzlandkreis
- Town: Barby

Area
  - Total: 19.75 km^{2} (7.63 sq mi)
- Elevation: 52 m (171 ft)

Population (2006-12-31)
  - Total: 241
  - Density: 12.2/km^{2} (31.6/sq mi)
- Time zone: UTC+01:00 (CET)
  - Summer (DST): UTC+02:00 (CEST)
- Postal codes: 39240
- Dialling codes: 039294

Lödderitz is a village and a former municipality in the district Salzlandkreis, in Saxony-Anhalt, Germany.

Since 1 January 2010, it is part of the town Barby.
