= Sachsendorf, Saxony-Anhalt =

Sachsendorf
- Stadtteil of Barby
- Interactive map of Sachsendorf
- Location within Germany Location within Saxony-Anhalt
- Coordinates: 51°52′46″N 11°52′44″E
- Country: Germany
- State: Saxony-Anhalt
- District: Salzlandkreis
- Town: Barby

Area
  - Total: 9.67 km^{2} (3.73 sq mi)
- Elevation: 52 m (171 ft)

Population (2006-12-31)
  - Total: 313
  - Density: 32.4/km^{2} (83.8/sq mi)
- Time zone: UTC+01:00 (CET)
  - Summer (DST): UTC+02:00 (CEST)
- Postal codes: 39240
- Dialling codes: 039295

Sachsendorf is a village and a former municipality in the district Salzlandkreis, in Saxony-Anhalt, Germany.

Since 1 January 2010, it is part of the town Barby.

== See also ==
- Sachsendorf (b Calbe) station
