= Pömmelte =

- Stadtteil of Barby
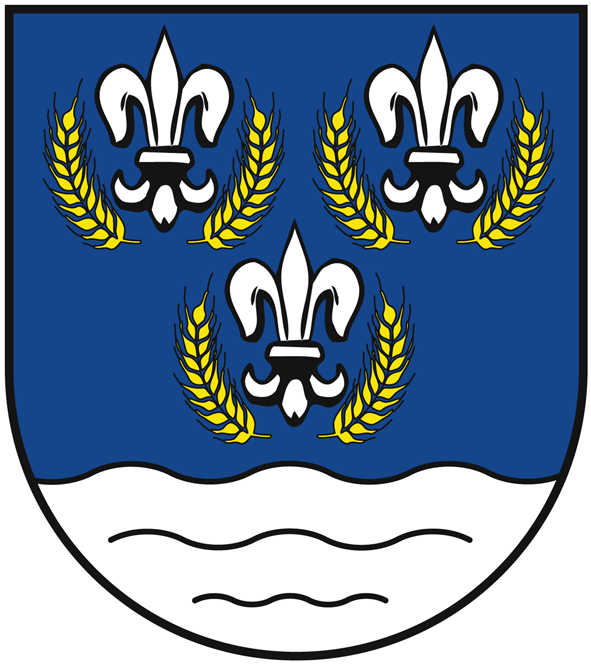
- Coat of arms
- Interactive map of Pömmelte
- Location within Germany Location within Saxony-Anhalt
- Coordinates: 51°59′50″N 11°47′59″E
- Country: Germany
- State: Saxony-Anhalt
- District: Salzlandkreis
- Town: Barby

Area
  - Total: 12.35 km^{2} (4.77 sq mi)
- Elevation: 49 m (161 ft)

Population (2006-12-31)
  - Total: 660
  - Density: 53/km^{2} (140/sq mi)
- Time zone: UTC+01:00 (CET)
  - Summer (DST): UTC+02:00 (CEST)
- Postal codes: 39249
- Dialling codes: 039298
- Website: https://www.salzlandkreis.de/bildungkultur/ringheiligtum-poemmelte/

Pömmelte is a village and a former municipality in the district Salzlandkreis, in Saxony-Anhalt, Germany. Since 1 January 2010, it is part of the town Barby. The modern settlement is first documented in 1292 and probably was founded not too long before, probably by Sorbian settlers. Prehistorical dwelling structures, dating from 2800 - 2200 BC and associated with the Bell Beaker and Unetice cultures, have also been identified.

== Pömmelte ring sanctuary ==
During the Bronze Age, around the late third millennium BCE, Pömmelte was the site of an astronomical observatory (Ringheiligtum Pömmelte) with a function and design similar to Stonehenge, built in wood, with radiocarbon dates indicating 2300 BCE as the earliest phase of the ritual centre. The Pömmelte observatory/sanctuary is associated with the Bell Beaker culture and subsequent Unetice culture. Speculation among anthropologists in 2018 is considering recognition of a cultural tie broadly throughout Europe and the British Isles associating the traditions from which these structures arose to those much earlier, in places such as such as the 7000-year-old Goseck circle in Germany.

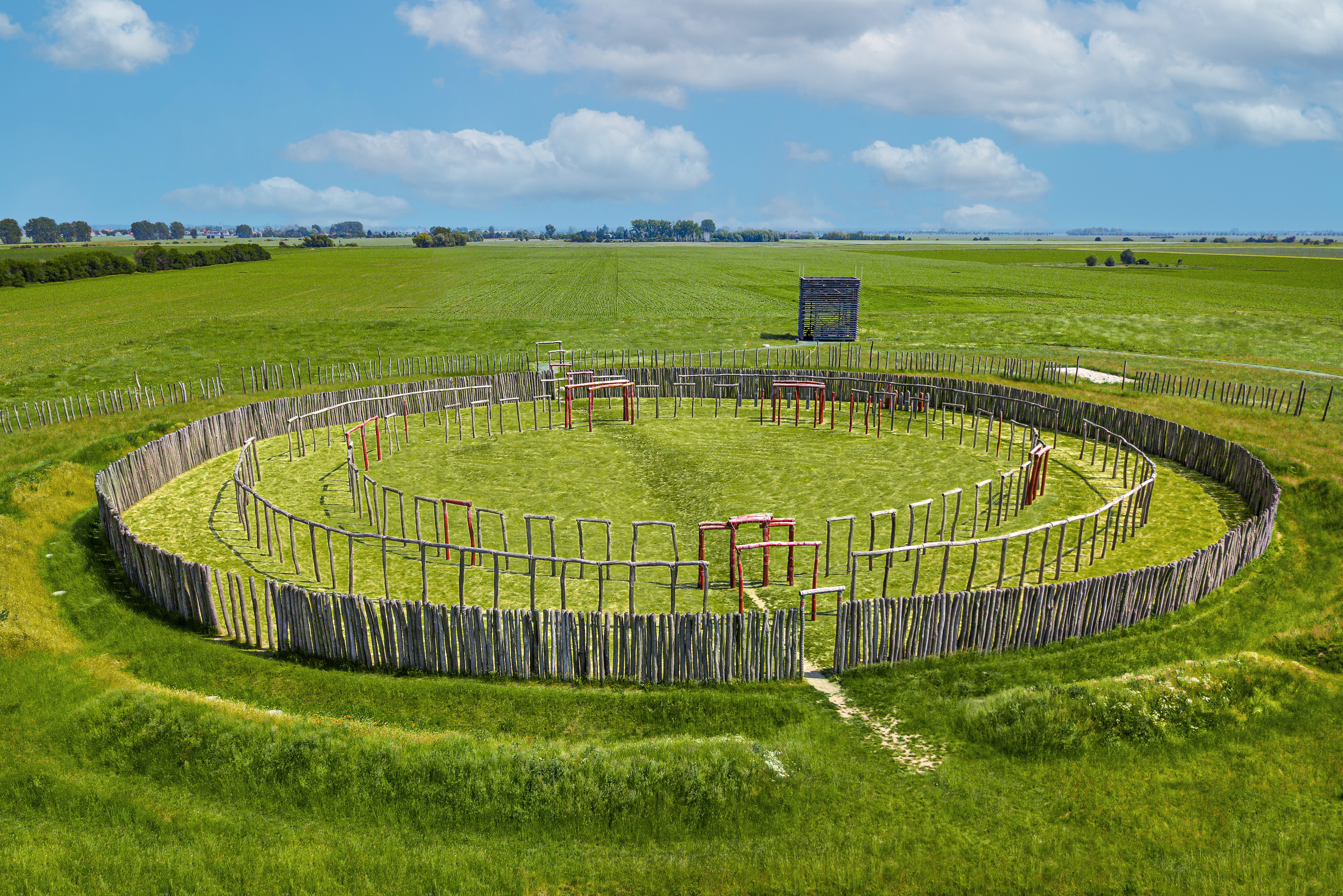

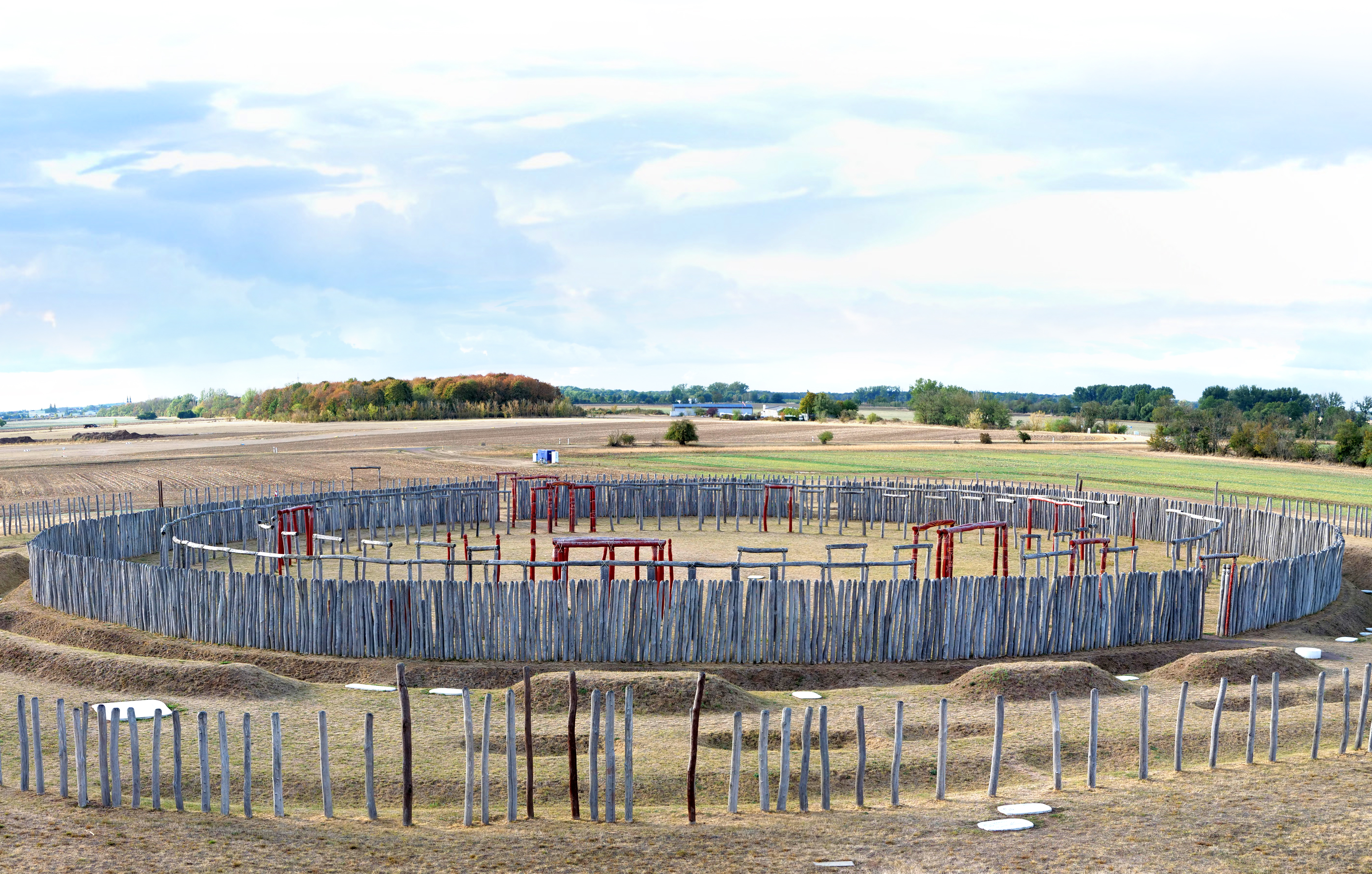

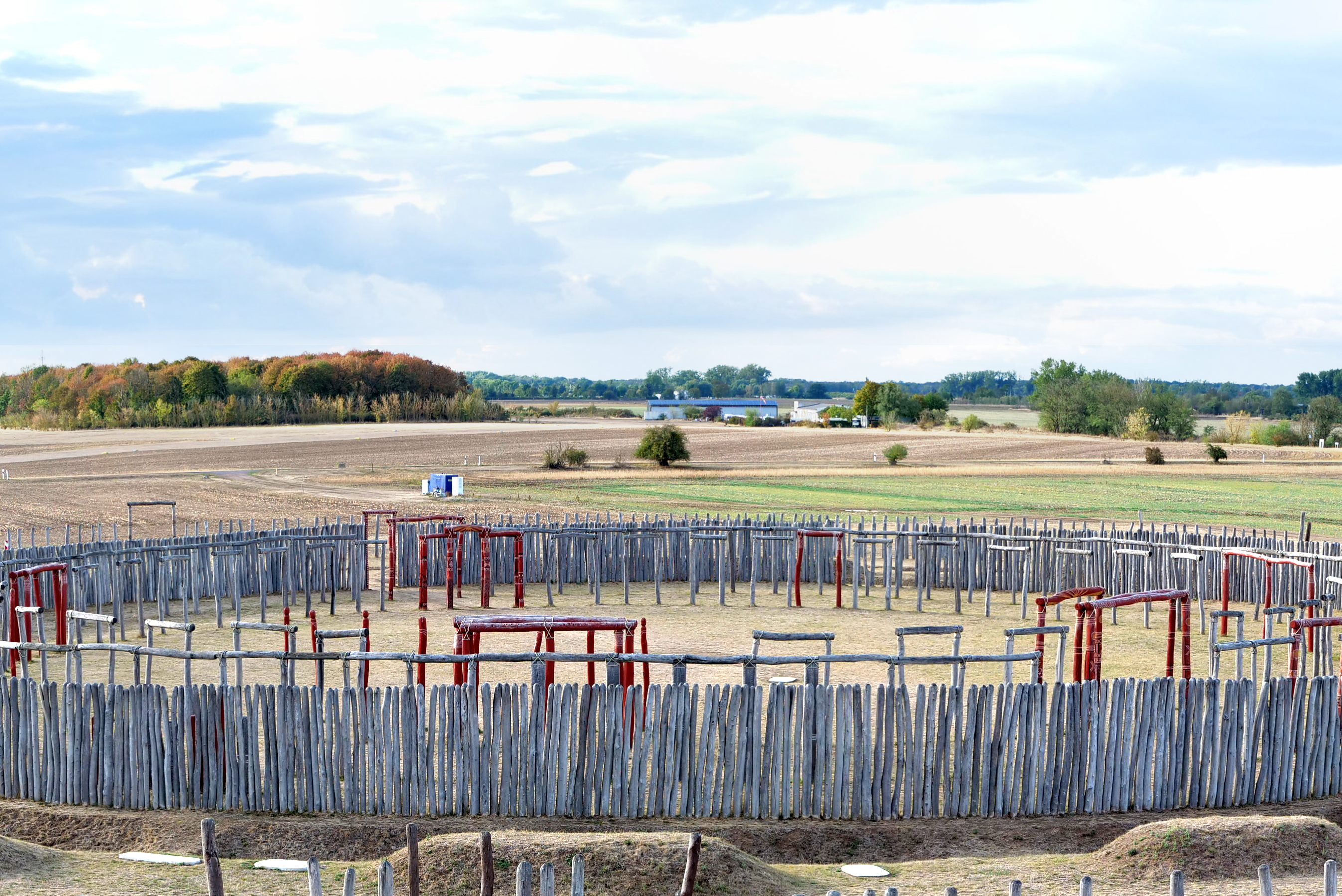

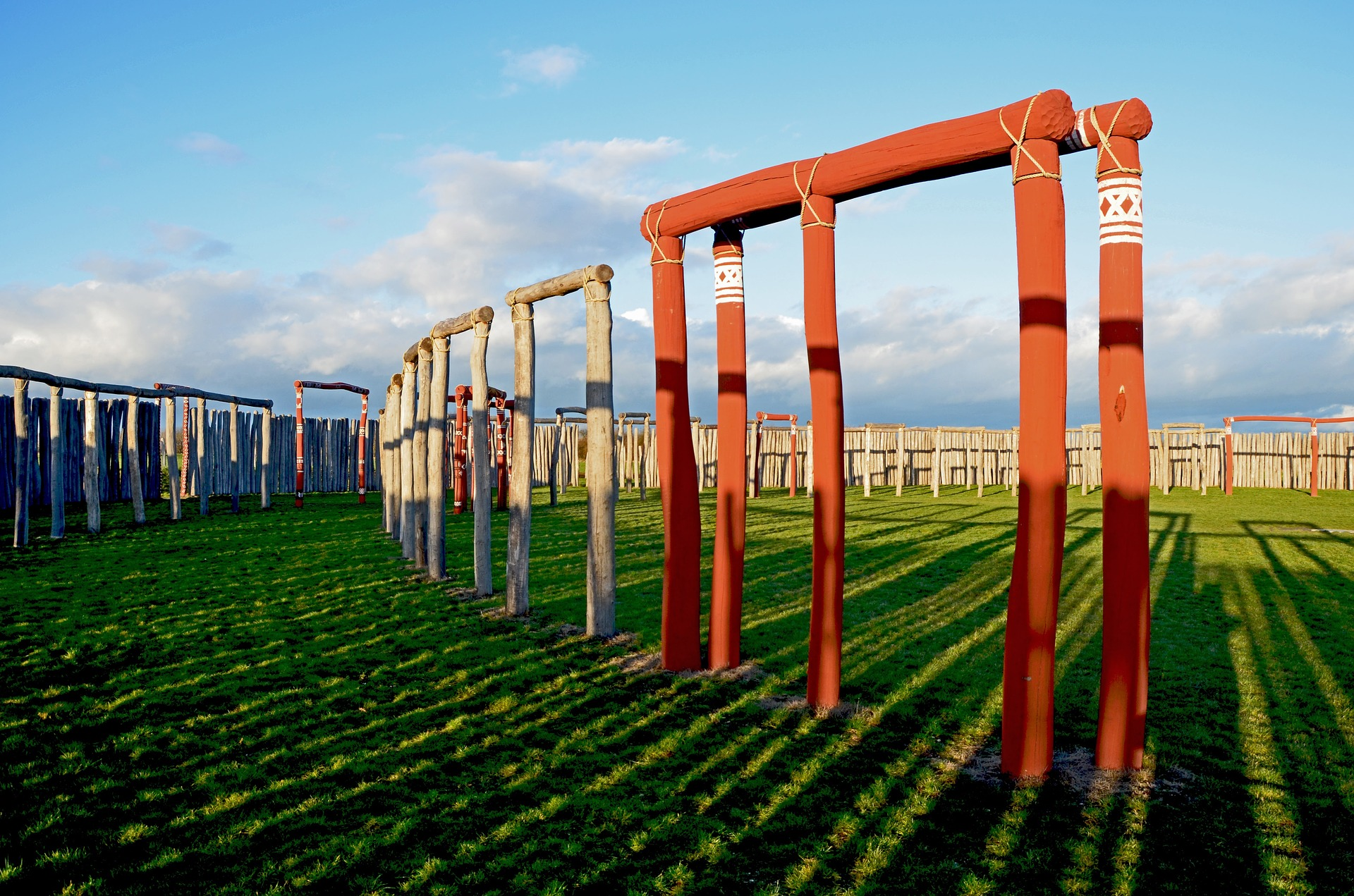

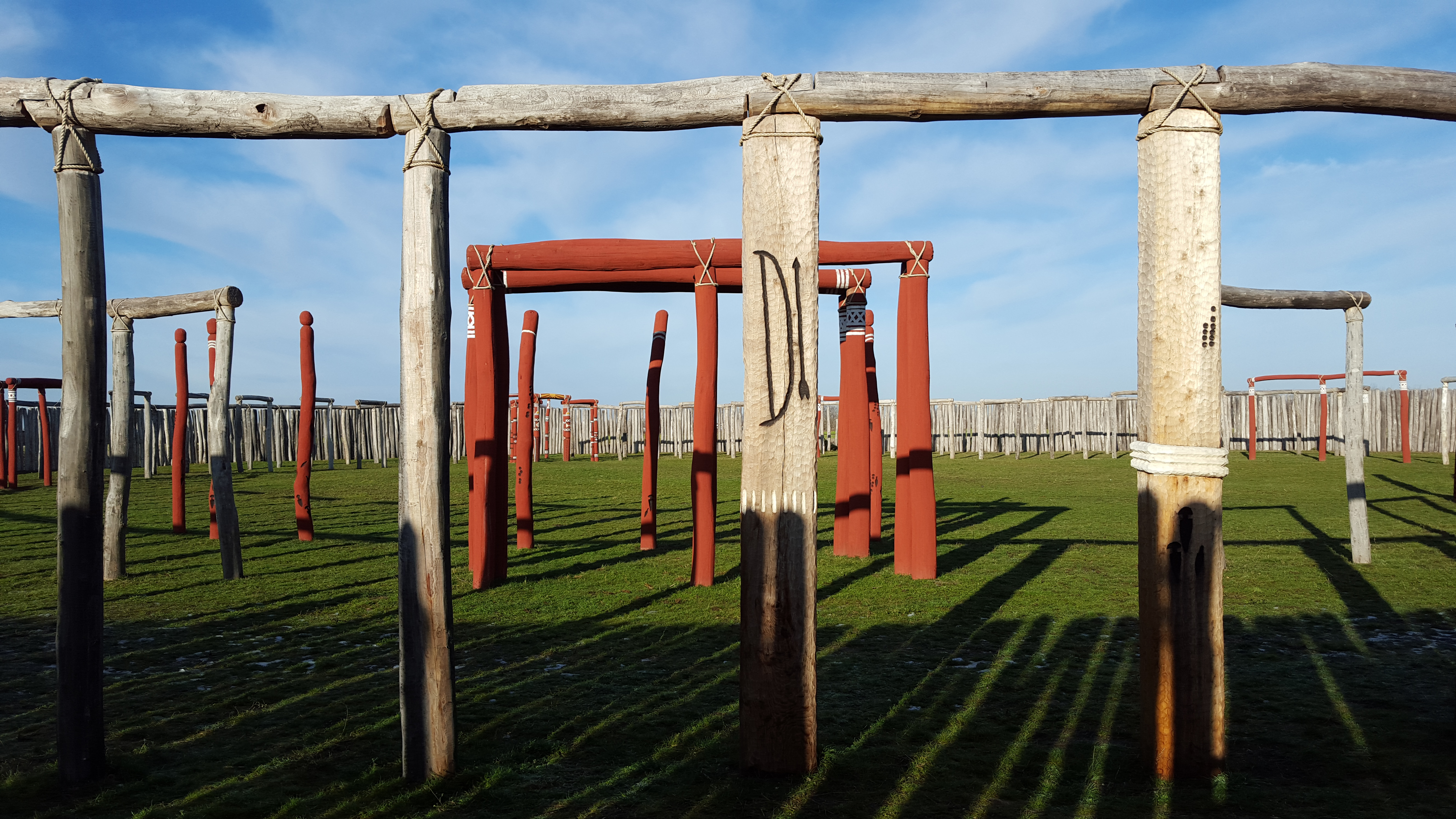

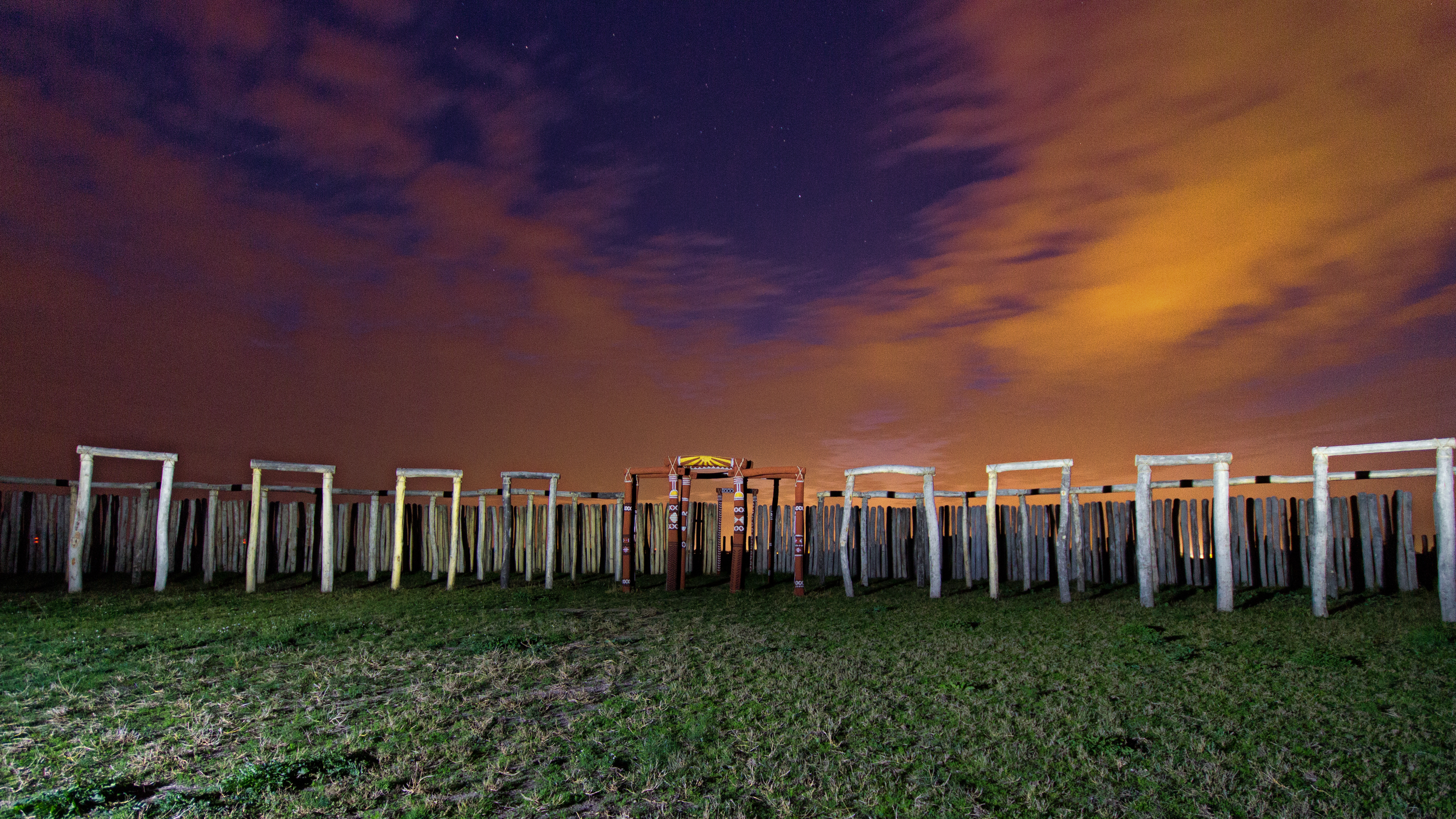

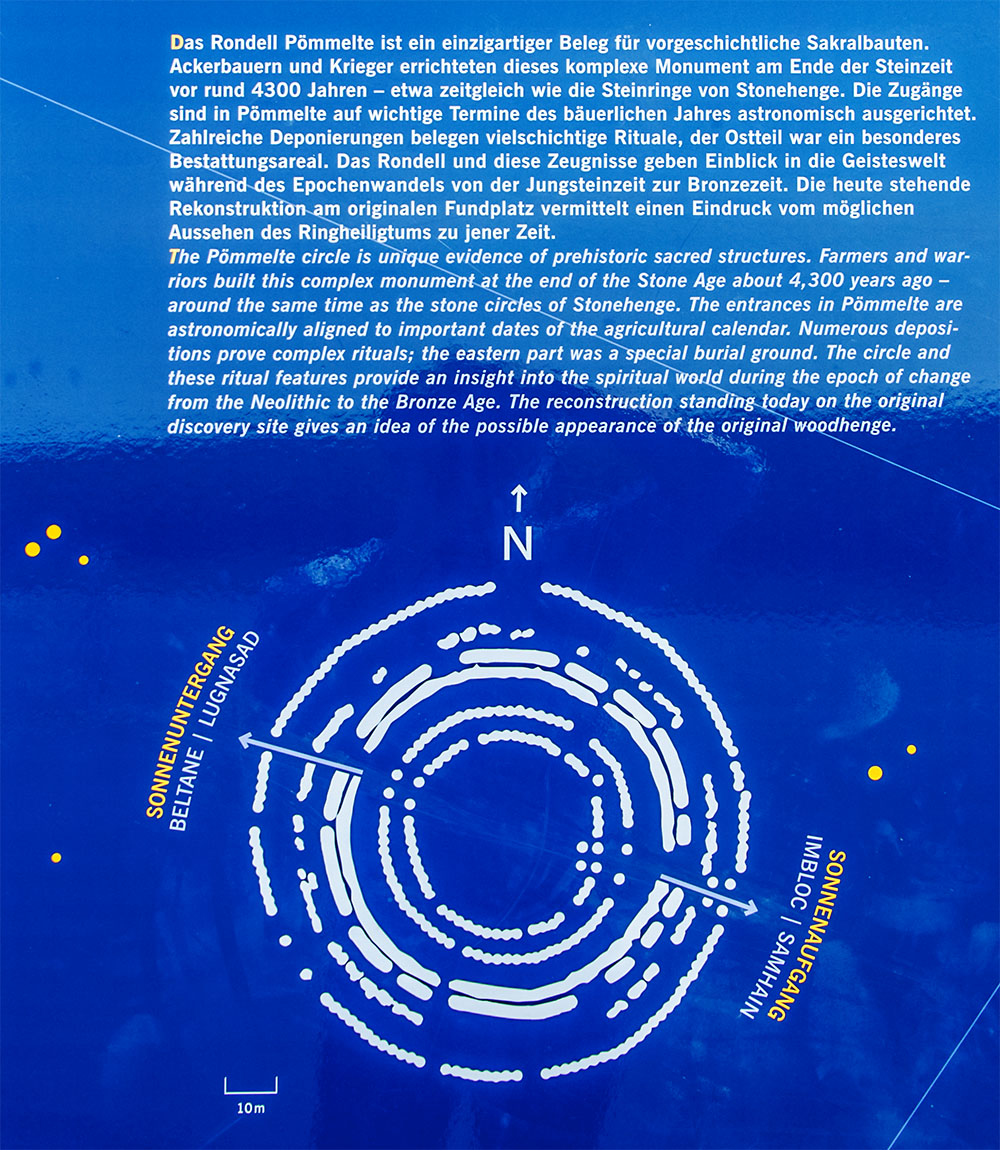
Information board at the site

== See also ==
- Bell Beaker culture
- Unetice culture
- Bronze Age Britain
- Nordic Bronze Age
