= Georg Oeder =

German painter

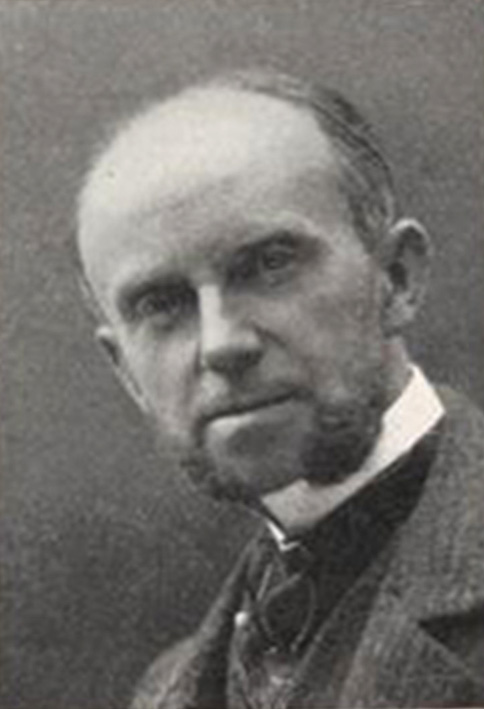
Georg Oeder, Art Committee and delegate to the International Art Exhibition, Düsseldorf 1904

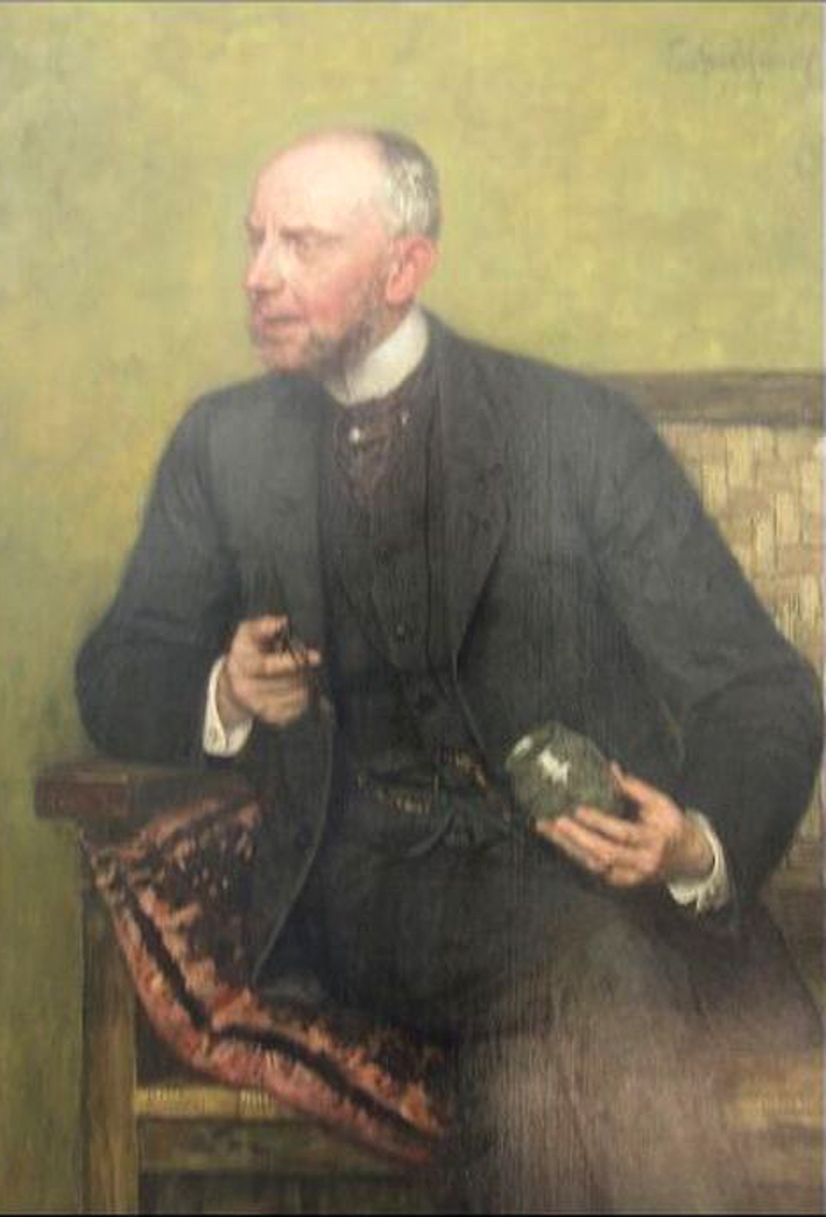
Portrait of Georg Oeder, by Eduard von Gebhardt, 1907

Georg Oeder (12 April 1846 – 4 July 1931) was a German Landscape painter of the Düsseldorf school of painting.

== Life and work ==
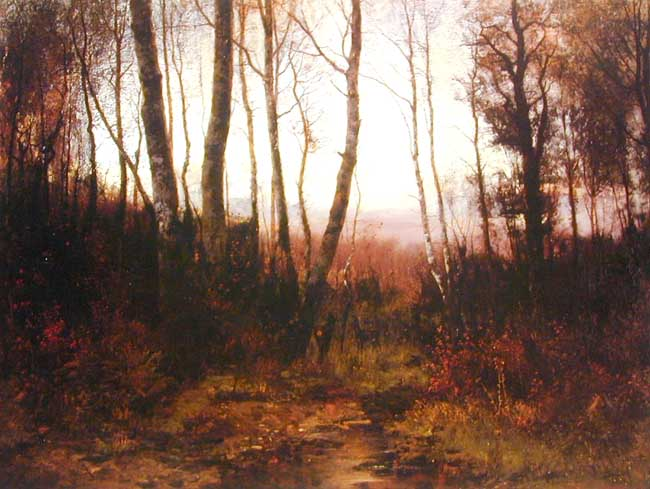
Dämmerung, ca. 1880

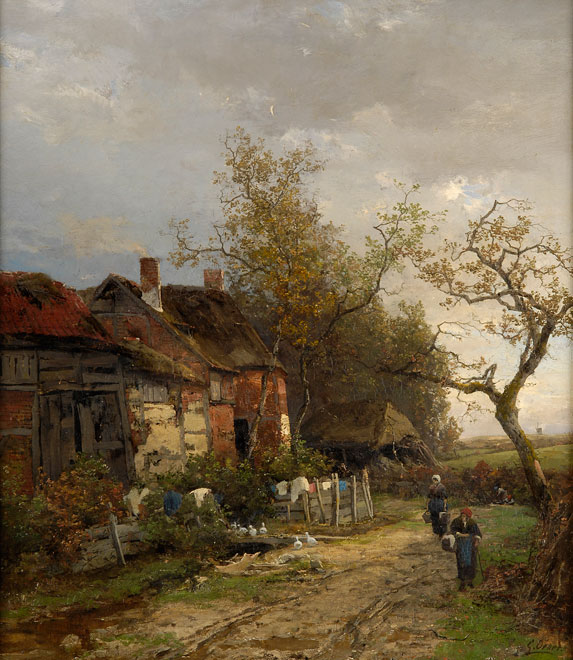
Morgens auf dem Lande, undated

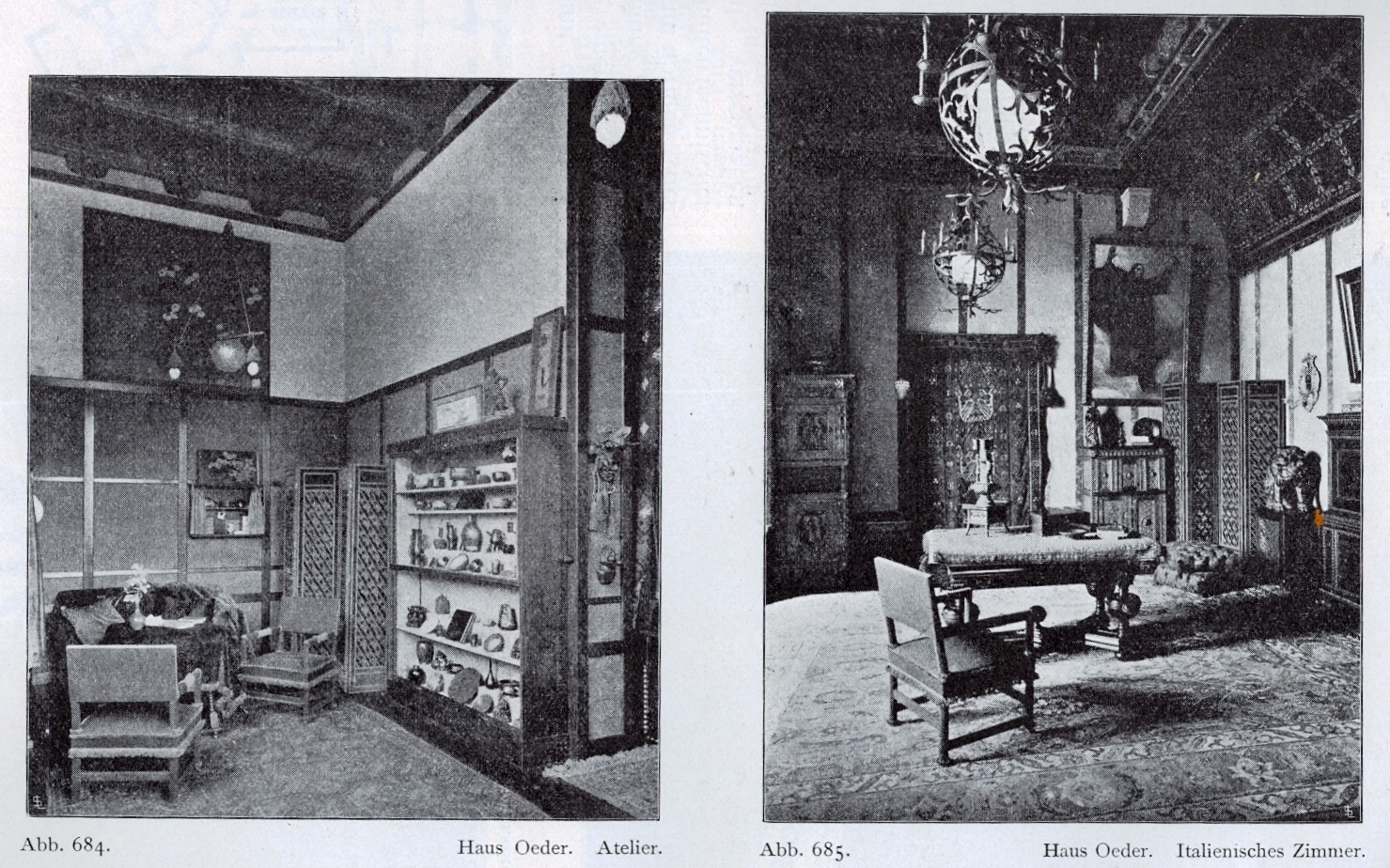
Studio with Japanese collection and Italian room in the Haus Oeder, 1904

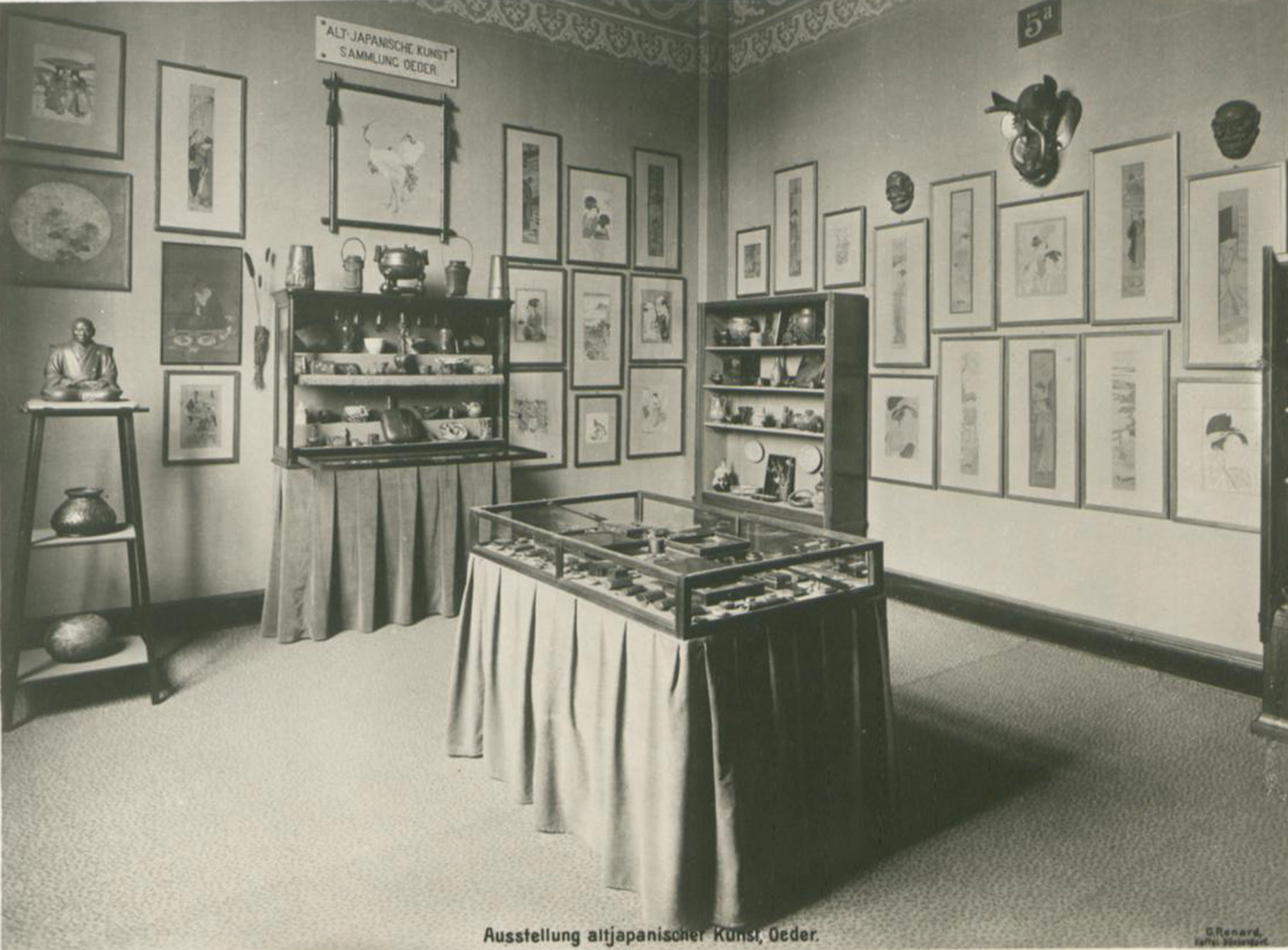
Ausstellung Oeders altjapanischer Kunst im Ausstellungspalast, 1902

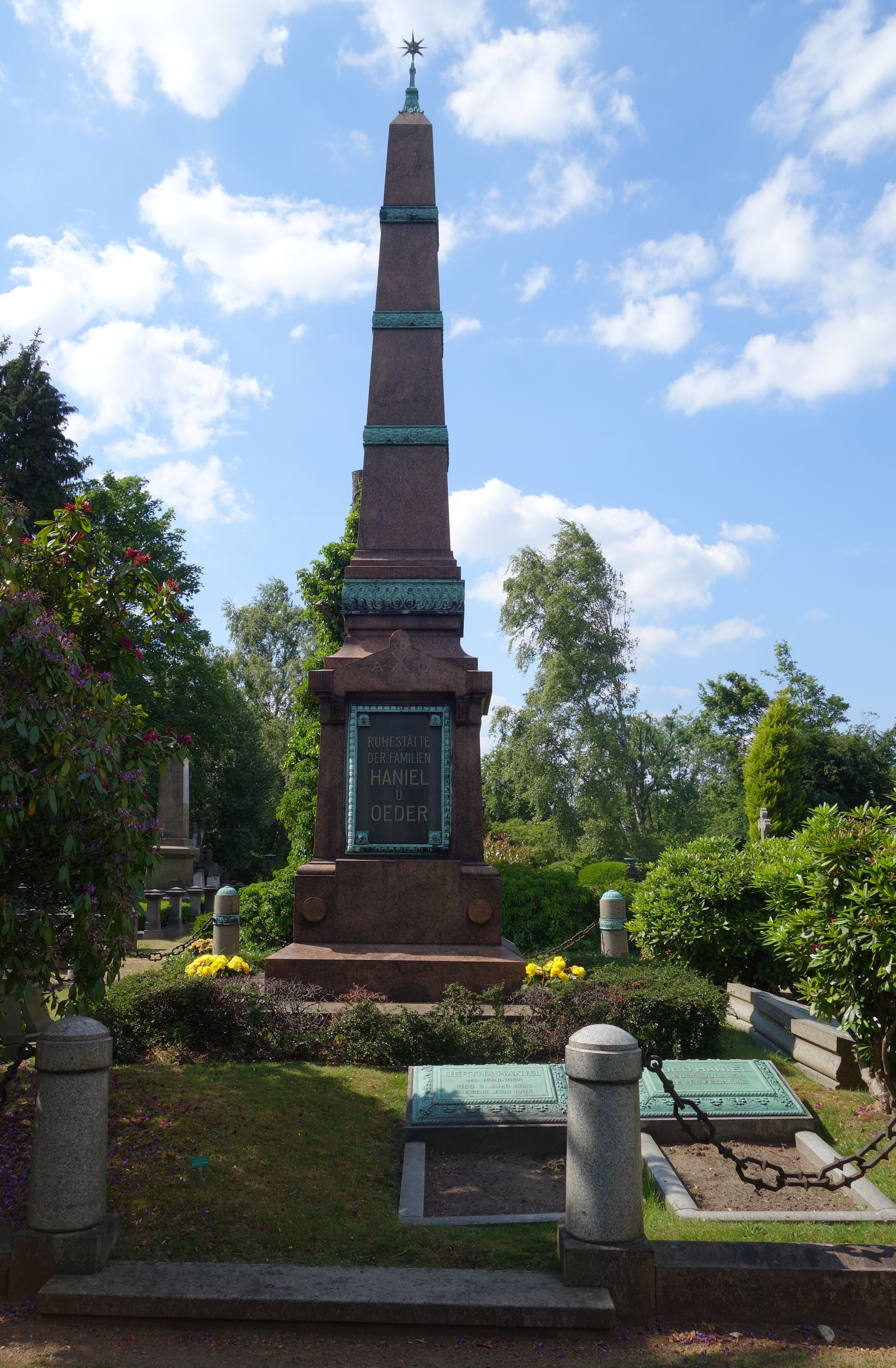
Gravesite of the Haniel and Oeder family, architect Gottfried Wehling

Born in Aachen, Oeder was the son of the banker Julius Oeder (1810-1861) and his wife Louise Pauli, who was born in Ghent, and the grandson of the wool merchant and alderman mayor Johann Christian Oeder. He attended the grammar school in Duisburg, then the commercial school in Wiesbaden. Afterwards he was a pupil in Westphalia for three years. In 1866, he joined the reserve escadron of the 11th Hussar Regiment in Düsseldorf. During the Franco-Prussian War, he served as a reserve officer. After the war he turned entirely to painting and was an associate of Emil Hünten.

He had already begun landscape painting from 1868, trying his hand at en plein air. Encouraged by Eduard Bendemann, the then director of the Kunstakademie Düsseldorf, he settled in Düsseldorf in 1869, lived on the Jägerhofstraße, but remained self-taught throughout his life. He perfected his technique while travelling in Bavaria, Holland, Switzerland, Austria, Italy, France and England.

His paintings are dominated by Paysages intimes from the Lower Rhine, often in a gloomy autumnal or wintry mood. Betont wird immer wieder der Einfluss Olof Jernberg's auf seine Malerei.

At the age of 47, a head condition forced him to give up painting. Shortly before, he had been awarded the title of professor. From then on, Oeder devoted himself to collecting Asian art, which included sword ornaments (tsuba) and Japanese prints, including ukiyo-e. The collection was auctioned in Vienna after Oeder's death on 17 October 1943.

In 1872, he built himself a Haus u. Privatgalerie Oeder house, directly next to the Malkasten at Jacobistraße 10, where he lived until his death. The residence, which also functioned as a private gallery, was luxuriously rebuilt and extended in 1894 according to plans by Hubert Jacobs and Gottfried Wehling. Oeder had been married since 11 September 1879 with Thusnelde (1860–1931), daughter of Ludwig Haniel from the famous entrepreneurial Haniel family and in 1890 co-owner of the machine factory "Haniel & Lueg" at the Düsseldorf-Grafenberg allee.

In 1898, on the occasion of the Malkasten's 50th anniversary, Oeder, Albert Flamm and Otto Erdmann received the Order of the Red Eagle 4th class.

Around 1900, Oeder, together with Paul Clemen, Heinrich Lueg and Fritz Roeber, was one of the initiators of the Industrie- und Gewerbeausstellung Düsseldorf. His collection of Japanese art was exhibited in the Ausstellungspalast built for this purpose at the "Deutsch-Nationale Kunstausstellung Düsseldorf 1902". In 1904, Oeder was, among others, on the art committee and delegate to the International Art Exhibition for the international Garden festival in Deutschland.

Oeder war Stifter der Fontänenskulptur Jröne Jong by Joseph Hammerschmidt in the middle of the Runden Weihers in Düsseldorf Hofgarten the marble bench made by Rudolf Bosselt in the Schmuckanlage and the Goltsteinparterre in Goltsteinstraße.

His wife Thusnelde Oeder, involved in Düsseldorf's cultural life, was a member of the Rhenish Women's Club, founded in 1905 and chaired by Minna Blanckertz.

In 1916, on the occasion of a special exhibition of his paintings, he became an honorary member of the Kunstakademie Düsseldorf. On his 80th birthday in 1926, the city of Düsseldorf made him an honorary citizen. It also honoured him by naming the Oederallee at the Tonhalle.

Oeder died in Düsseldorf at the age of 85 and is buried at Nordfriedhof (Düsseldorf).

== Work ==
- Waldlandschaft mit Rehen (1874)
- Der Holzschlag (1876)
- Spätherbststimmung (1879)
- Novembertag (1880), Berliner Nationalgalerie (on loan to Hanover from 1930, burnt there in 1943)
- Ein Herbstmorgen (1883)
- Waldinneres (1884)
- Motiv von der holländischen Küste (1886)
- Ein Landweg (before 1888)
