= Otto Erdmann =

Otto Erdmann may refer to:

- Otto Erdmann (painter), German painter
- Otto Erdmann (art director), German art director
- Otto Linné Erdmann, German chemist
