= Gottfried Wehling =

German architect (1862–1913)

Felix Gottfried Wehling (4 May 1862 – 19 January 1913) was a German architect.

== Life ==
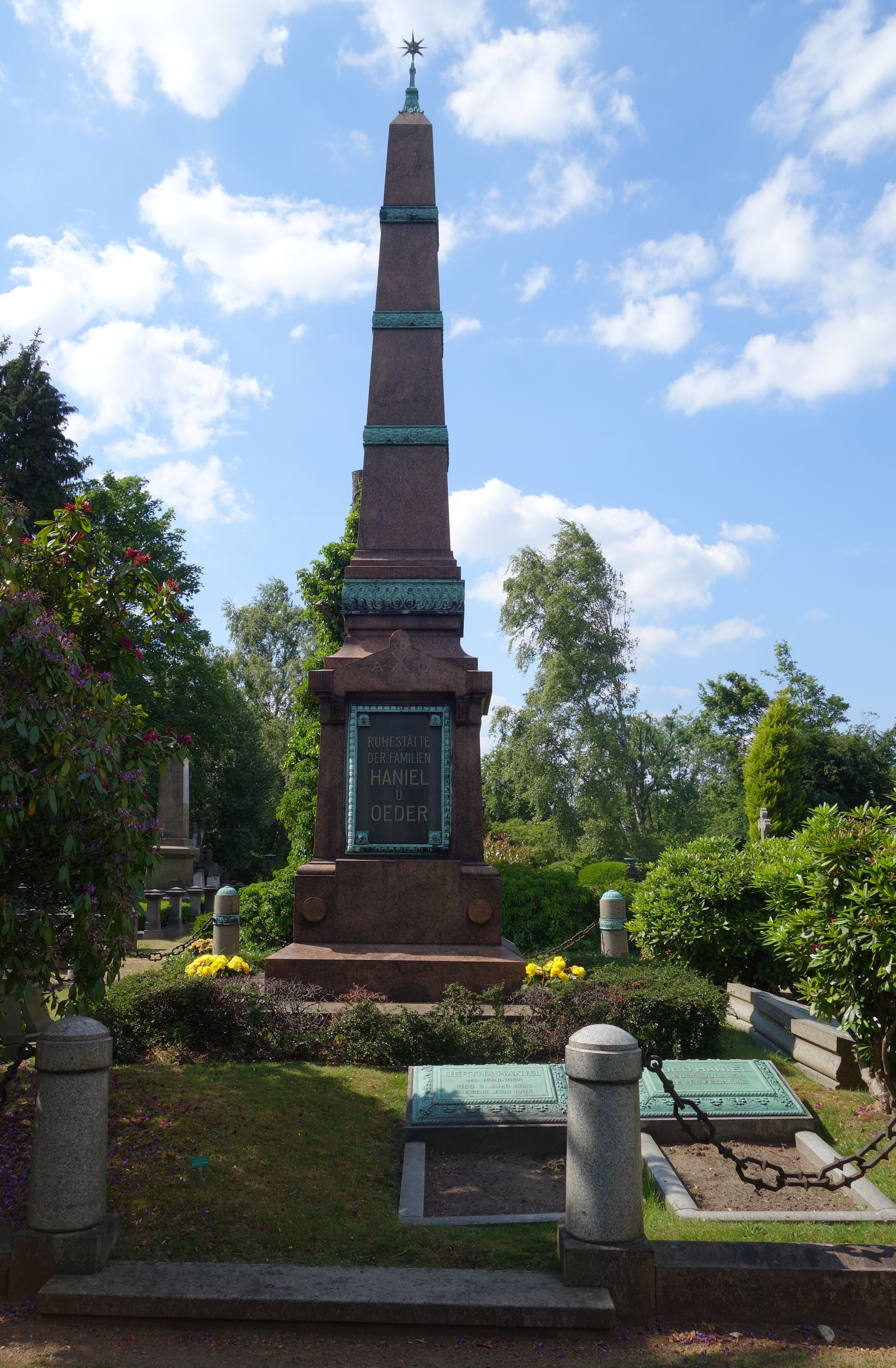
Gravestone of the Haniel family, Nordfriedhof (Düsseldorf)

Born in Barby, Wehling - who had moved from Cologne - was registered in Düsseldorf from 1886. He was married to Guiseppine Borghetti (1857-1929) from Locarno and had six children with his wife. His daughter Angelika Elisabeth (1893-1945) married the eau-de-Cologne manufacturer Johann Maria Carl Farina in 1921.

In Düsseldorf, he was involved in the city's "real boom period between 1900 and 1914". and worked for a time in various working groups and law firms, such as "Jacobs and Wehling" (with Hubert Jacobs) and "Wehling und Ludwig" (with Alois Ludwig).

Wehling died in Düsseldorf at the age of 50.

== Buildings and designs ==
=== 1886–1896 (in Büro Jacobs & Wehling) ===
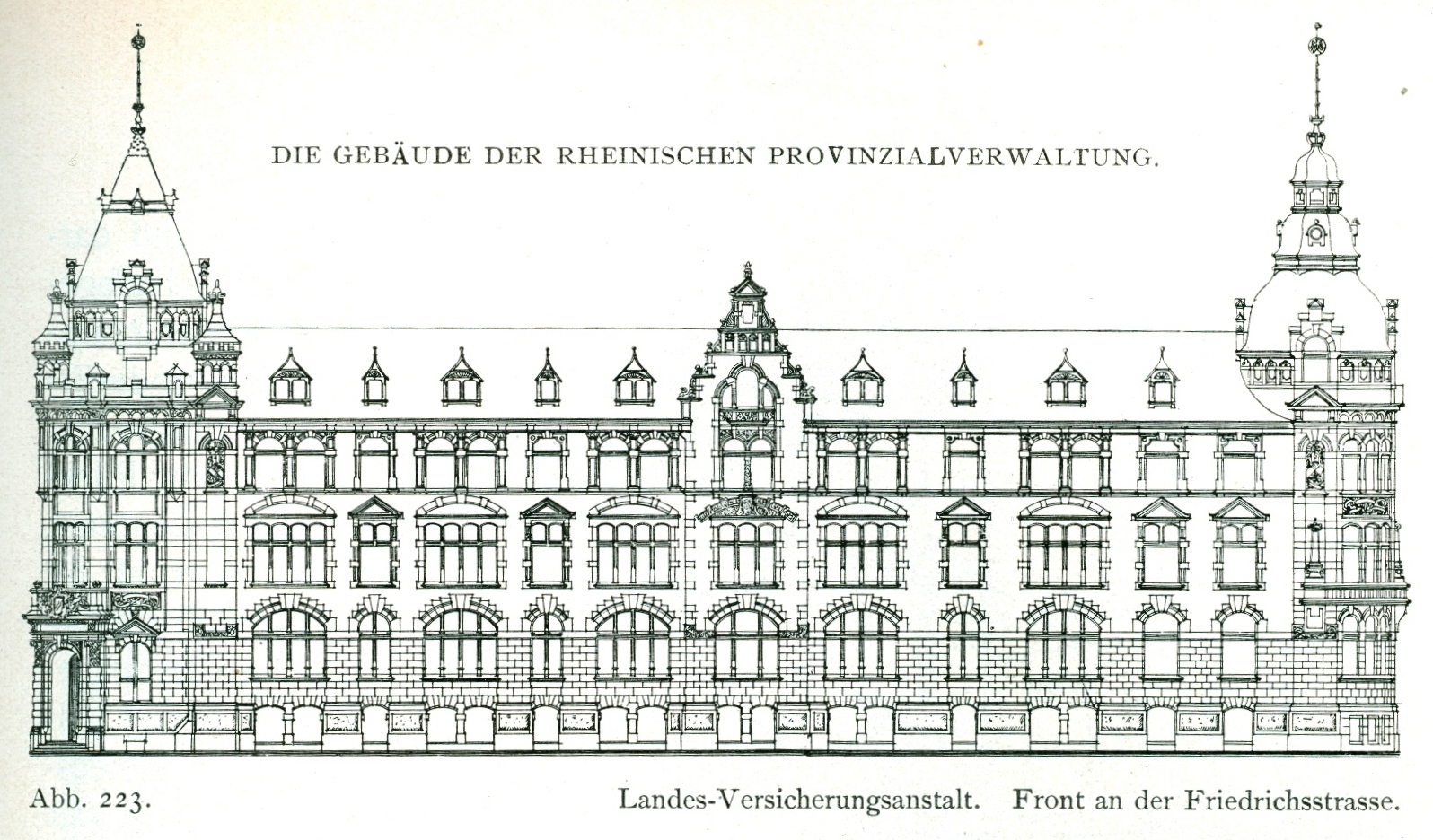
Building of the National Insurance Office

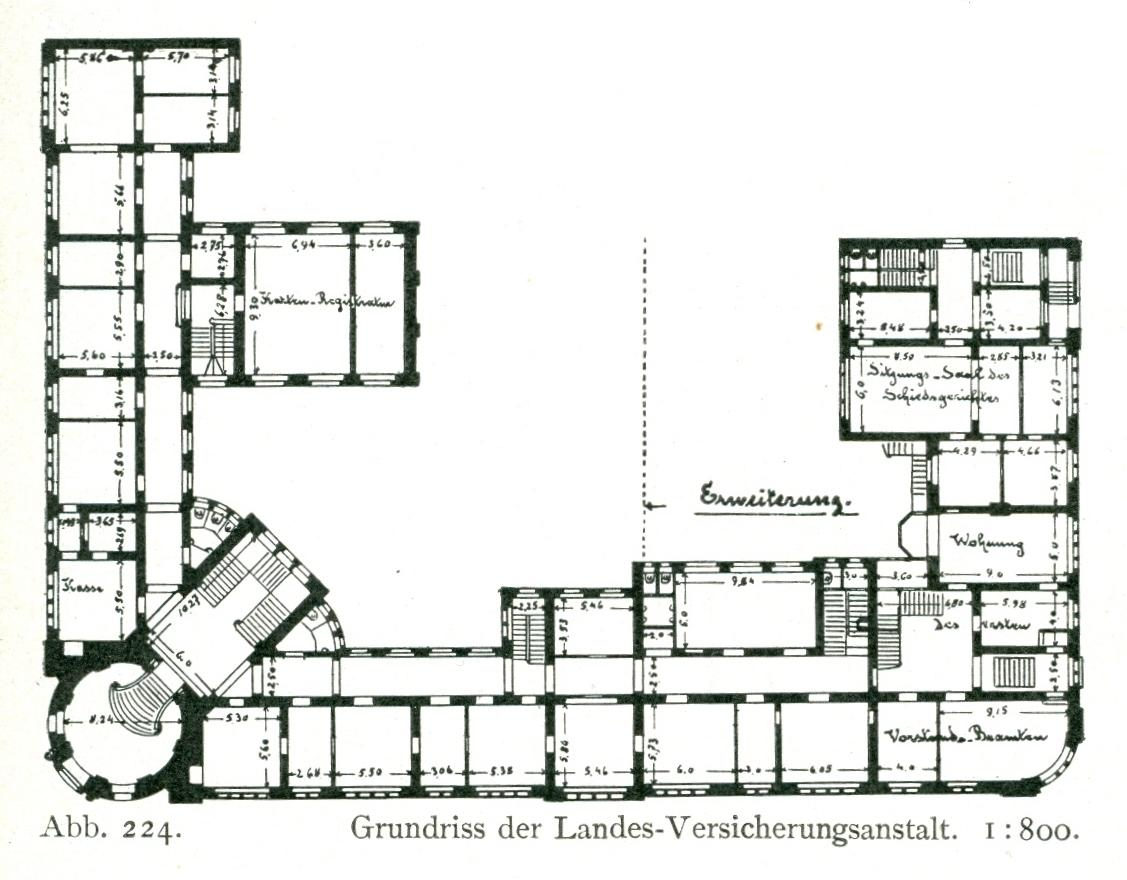
Building of the National Insurance Office, ground plan

In 1886/1887, Wehling built various houses in Cologne together with Hubert Jacobs. From 1888 onwards, the work of Wehling and Jacobs is documented in Düsseldorf, where they worked together until 1896. The office of Jacobs and Wehling is documented in the 1890, 1891 and 1892 editions of the Adressbuch der Oberbürgermeisterei Düsseldorf.

- 1886/1887: Haus Luxemburger Straße 34 in Cologne (Jacobs & Wehling).
- 1886/1887: Haus Von-Werth-Straße 59 / Hansaring 20 in Cologne (Jacobs & Wehling) (abandoned in 1972).
- 1888: Haus Grabenstraße 4 für die Firma Gebr. Mangold in Düsseldorf (Jacobs & Wehling).
- 1889: Wettbewerbsentwurf für ein Kaiser-Wilhelm-Denkmal am Drachenfels (Jacobs & Wehling) (1st prize, not implemented).
- 1890: Haus Breite Straße 8 for the Düsseldorfer Allgemeine Versicherungsgesellschaft für See-, Fluss- und Landtransport in Düsseldorf (Jacobs & Wehling).
- 1891: Haus Bismarckstraße 106 in Düsseldorf (Jacobs & Wehling).
- 1892: Haus Kaiser-Wilhelm-Straße 1, Ecke Oststraße in Düsseldorf (Jacobs & Wehling).
- 1892: Haus Kaiser-Wilhelm-Straße 55 in Düsseldorf (Jacobs & Wehling).
- 1894: Conversion of the Haus u. Privatgalerie Oeder at the Jacobistraße in Düsseldorf in historicist style of the Italian Renaissance (Jacobs & Wehling). The designs were created by "Gottfr. Wehling in close consultation with the builder".
- 1895: Haus Elisabethstraße 11 in Düsseldorf.
- 1895–1896: Landesversicherungsanstalt der Rheinprovinz (Gebäude), Friedrichstraße / Adersstraße, 1,860 m² built-up area, in the style of "modernised renaissance forms" (Jacobs & Wehling).
- 1896: Warenhaus Hartoch, Bolkerstraße 19–21 in Düsseldorf (Jacobs & Wehling). Other works included the creation of remarkable intérieurs in Düsseldorf:
- Haus Alleestraße 42.
- House Königsallee 13.

=== 1897/1898 (Gottfried Wehling, Düsseldorf) ===
From 1897 to 1898, the architect Gottfried Wehling built the Gürtler'sches Geschäftshaus Alleestraße 30 in Düsseldorf with "modernising Renaissance forms [and] remarkable naturalistic ornamentation". In 1898, the "architect Gottfried Wehling" rebuilt the façade of the commercial building of the company C. Fausel, Schadowstraße 34 in Düsseldorf.

=== 1900–1903 (Wehling & Ludwig) ===
From 1900 onwards, Gottfried Wehling and Alois Ludwig collaborated in Düsseldorf, where they worked together until 1903. But the architects also produced works in Cologne, the most famous being the Villa Bestgen.

- 1900: Conversion and extension of the commercial building Schadowstraße 23 of the company Gebrüder Mangold in Düsseldorf, "magnificent example of a modern poster house" (Wehling & Ludwig).
- 1900: Geschäftshaus Schadowstraße 52 for the photographer Thomas Lantin (Wehling & Ludwig).
- 1901/1902: Construction of the Wehling’sche Geschäftsgruppe Königsallee 9/11, Königsallee 9/11
- 1901/1902: Blumenstraße 7/9 in Düsseldorf (Wehling & Ludwig).
- 1903: Construction of a row of small single-family houses in Parkstraße in Düsseldorf, which were to have as many "healthy" rooms as possible at low construction costs (Wehling & Ludwig).
- 1903/1904: Villa Bestgen, Theodor-Heuss-Ring 9 in Cologne (Wehling & Ludwig).

=== 1904–1912 (Gottfried Wehling, Düsseldorf) ===
Wehling's work as an independent architect and urban planner is documented from 1904 to 1912.

- before 1904: Grabmal für Familie Haniel auf dem Düsseldorfer Nordfriedhof (architect G. Wehling).
- 1907: Prinz-Georg-Straße 37, 39, 41 (Düsseldorf).
- 1912: Competition design "for the urban development of the Frankfurter Wiesen in Leipzig" (not awarded a prize).

=== Illustrations ===
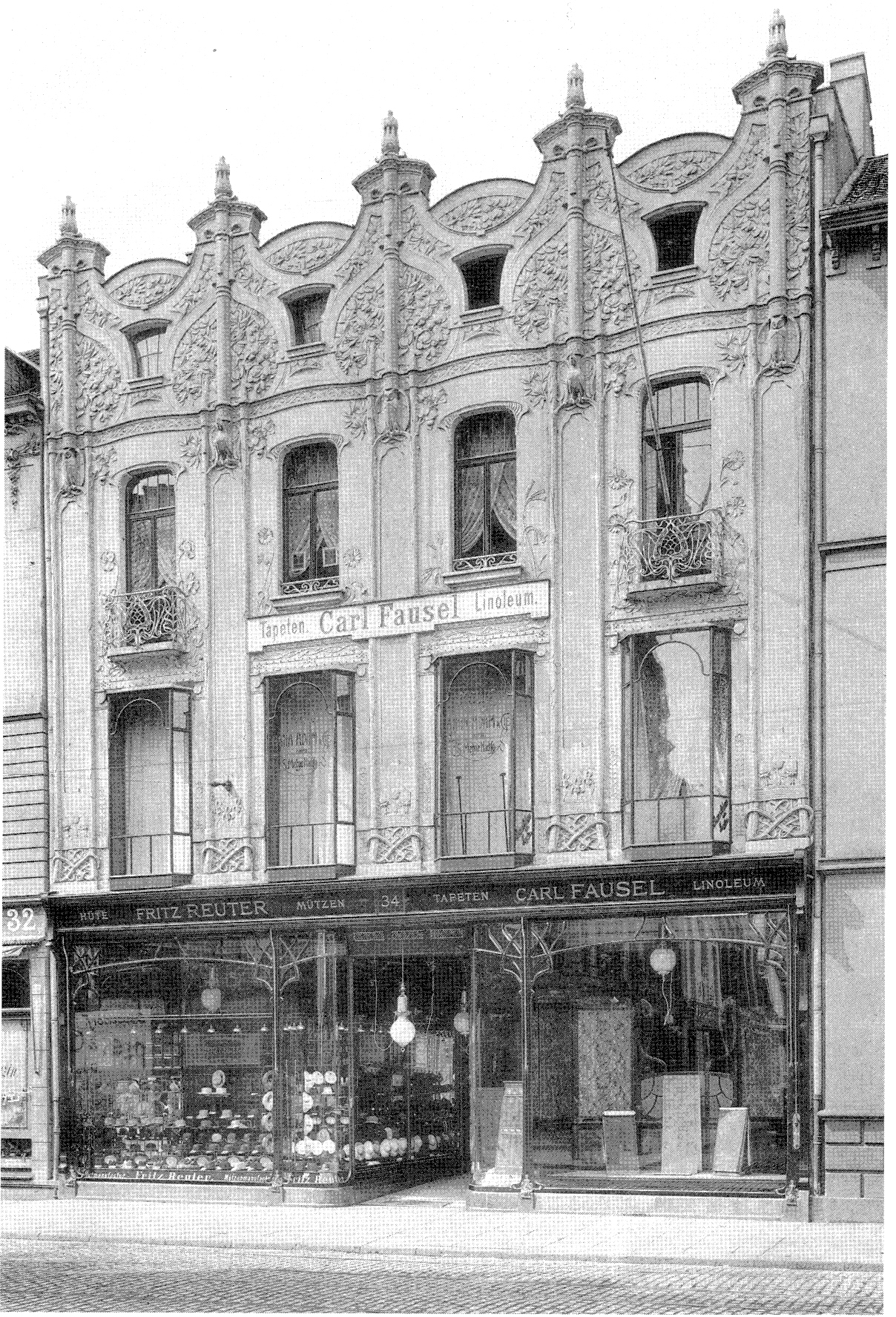
Haus Schadowstraß 34 in Düsseldorf

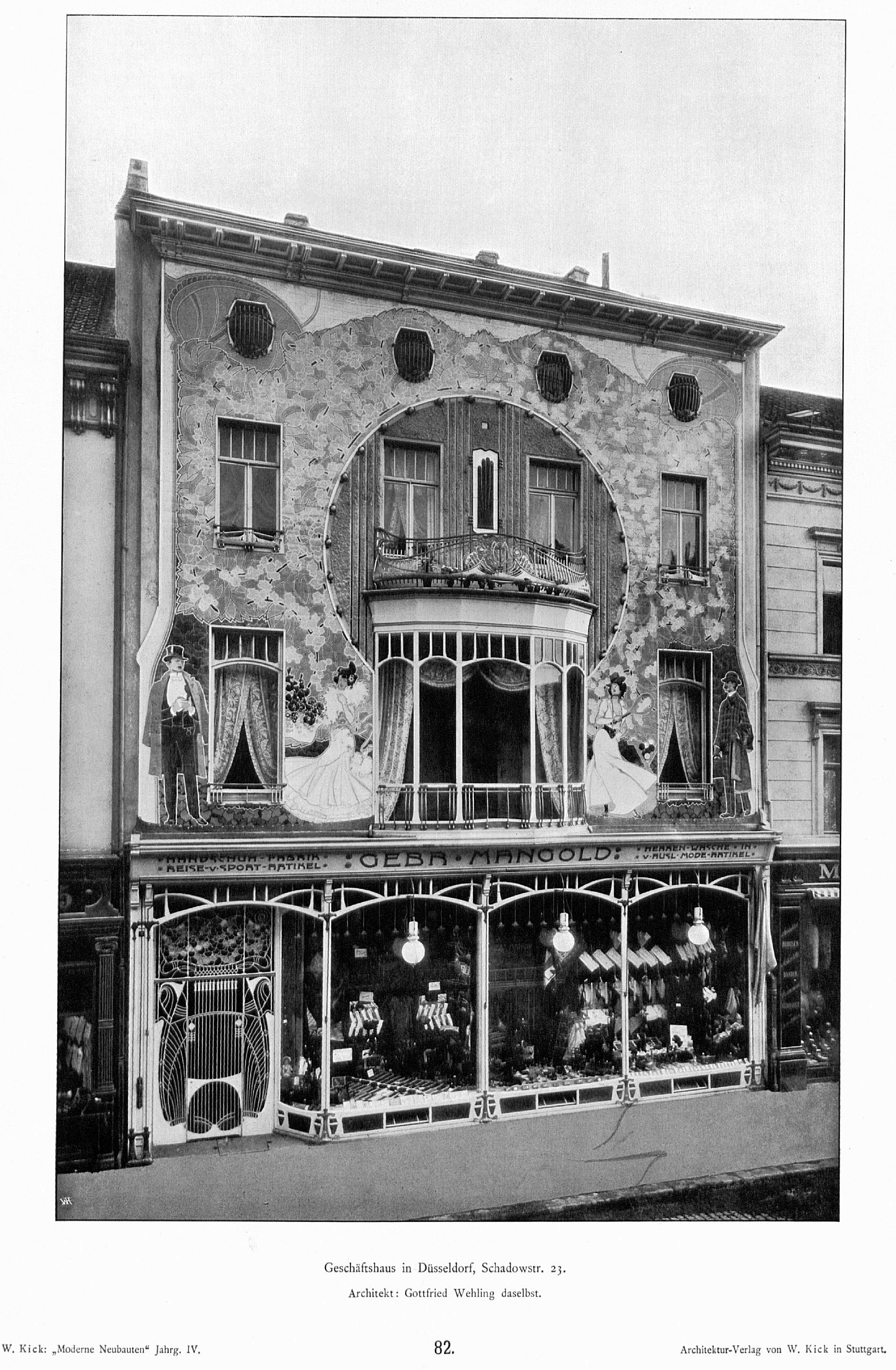
Haus Schadowstraße 23 in Düsseldorf

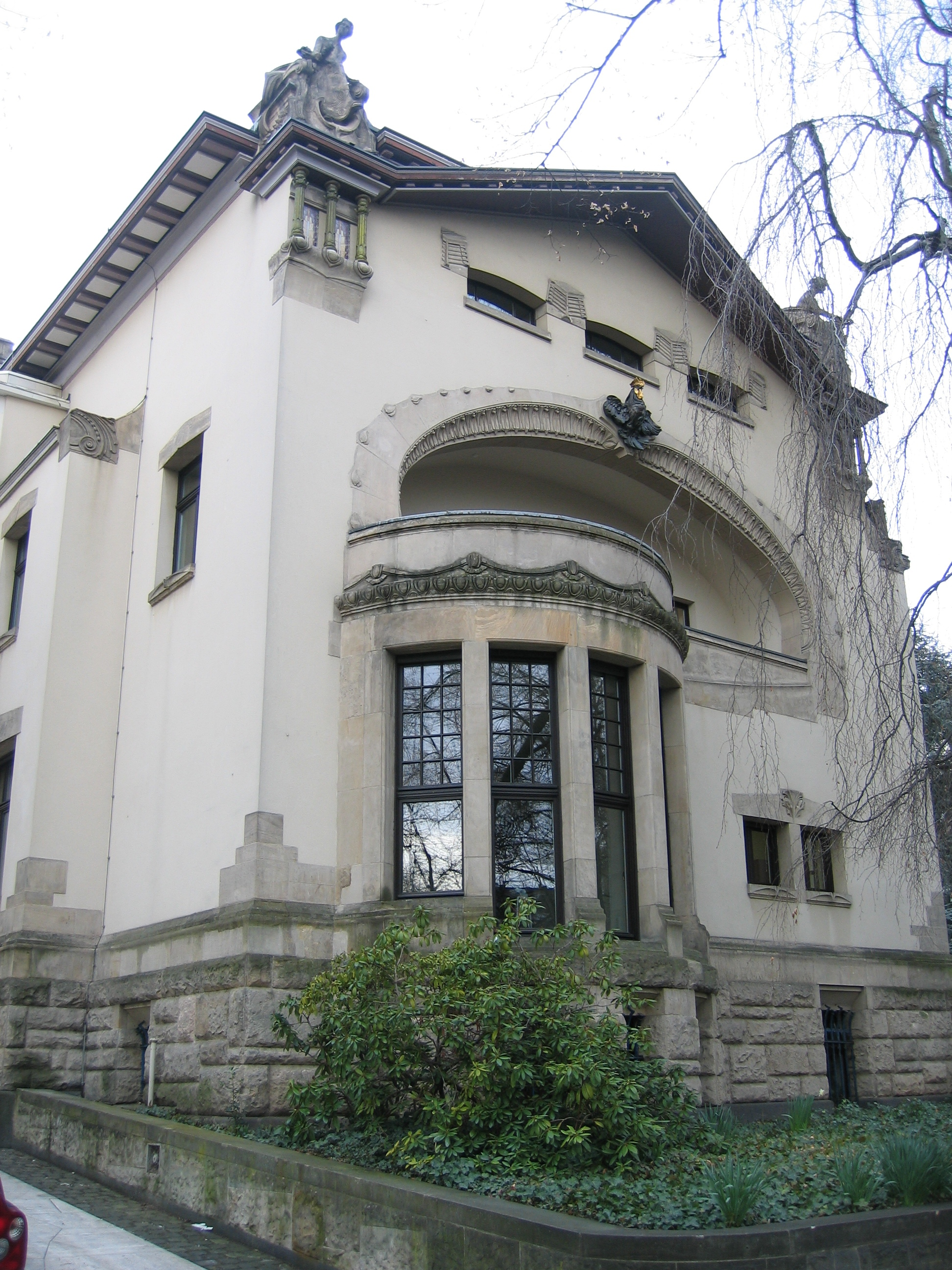
Villa Bestgen in Cologne

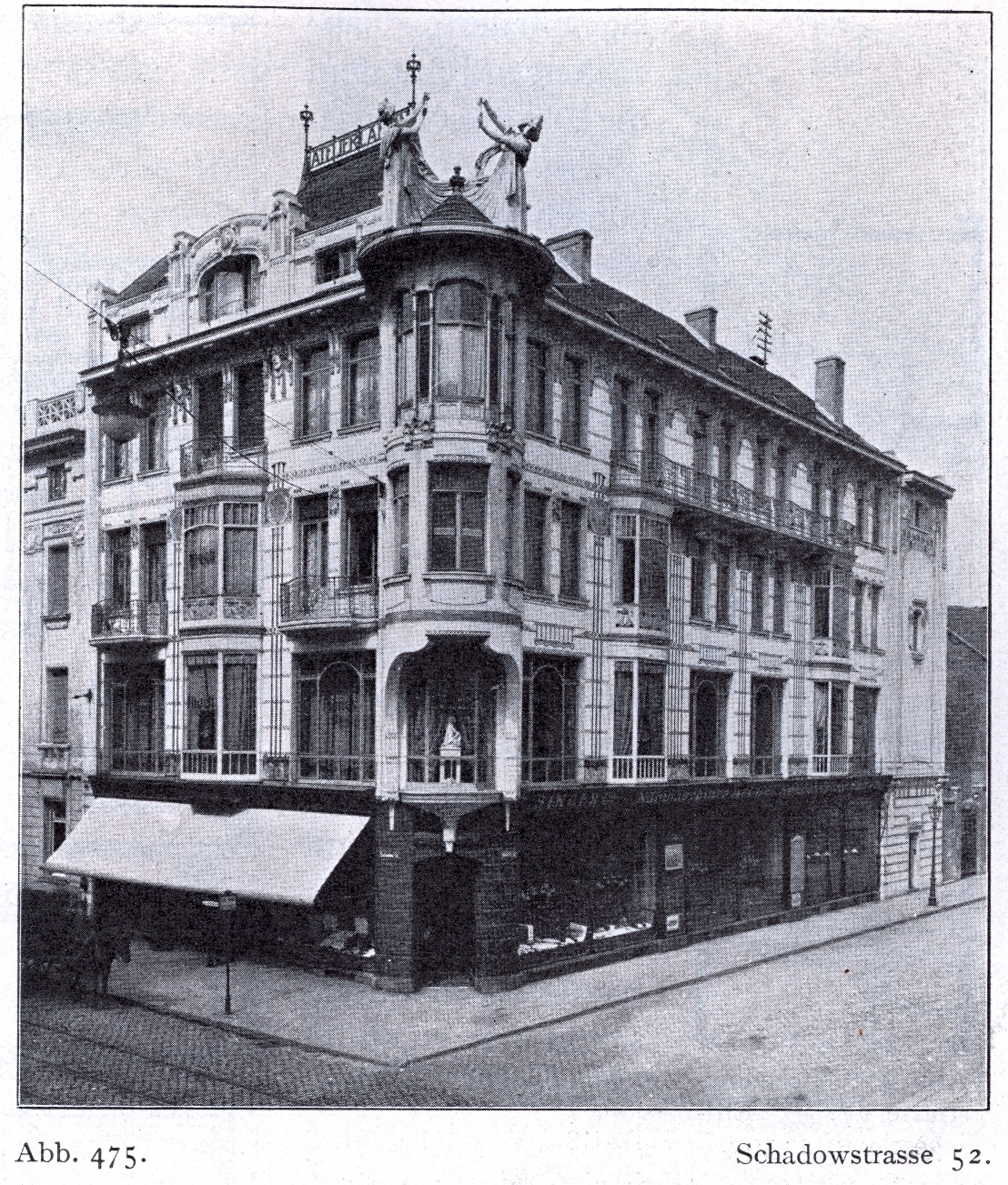
Schadowstraße 52

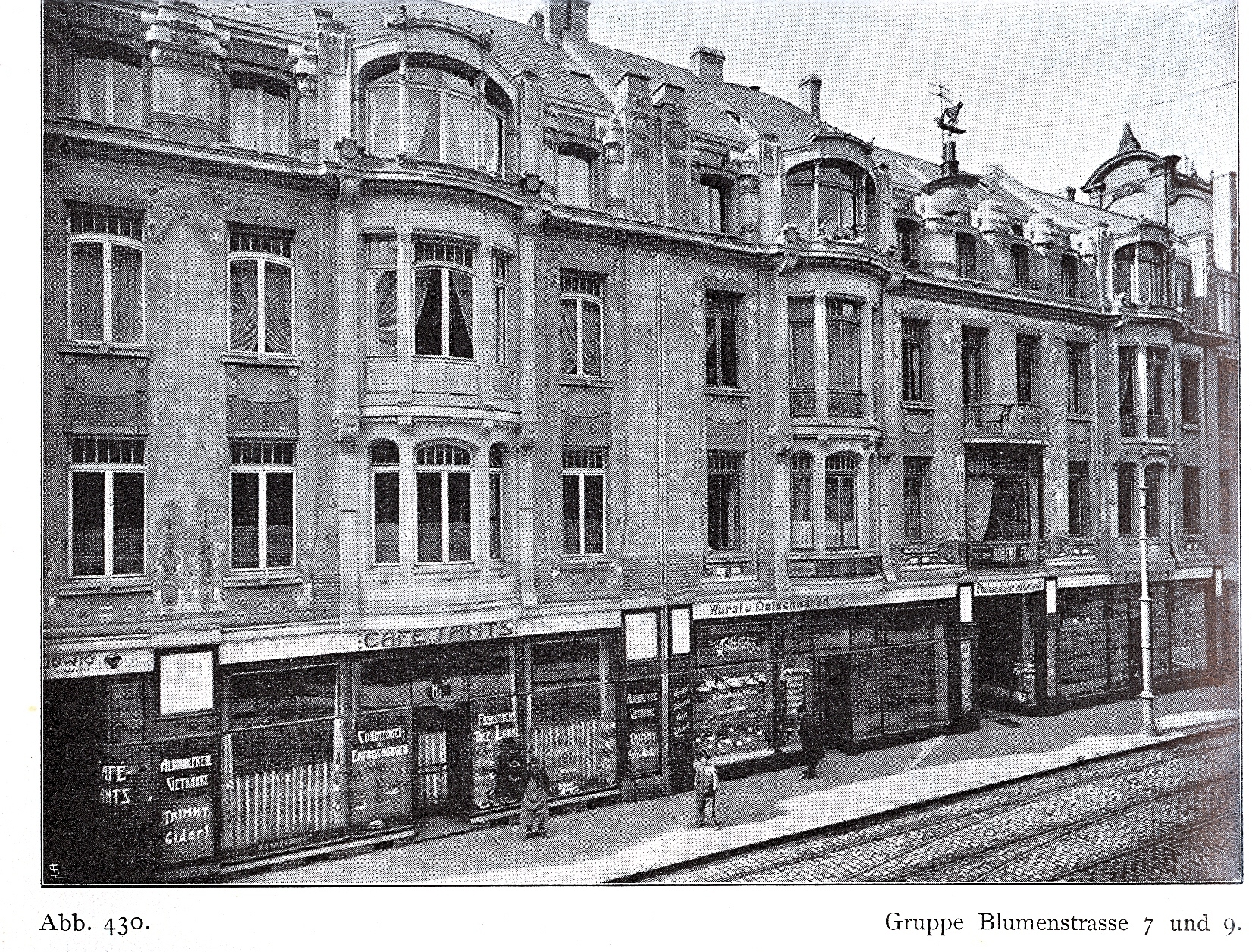
Doppelhaus Blumenstraße 7 und 9

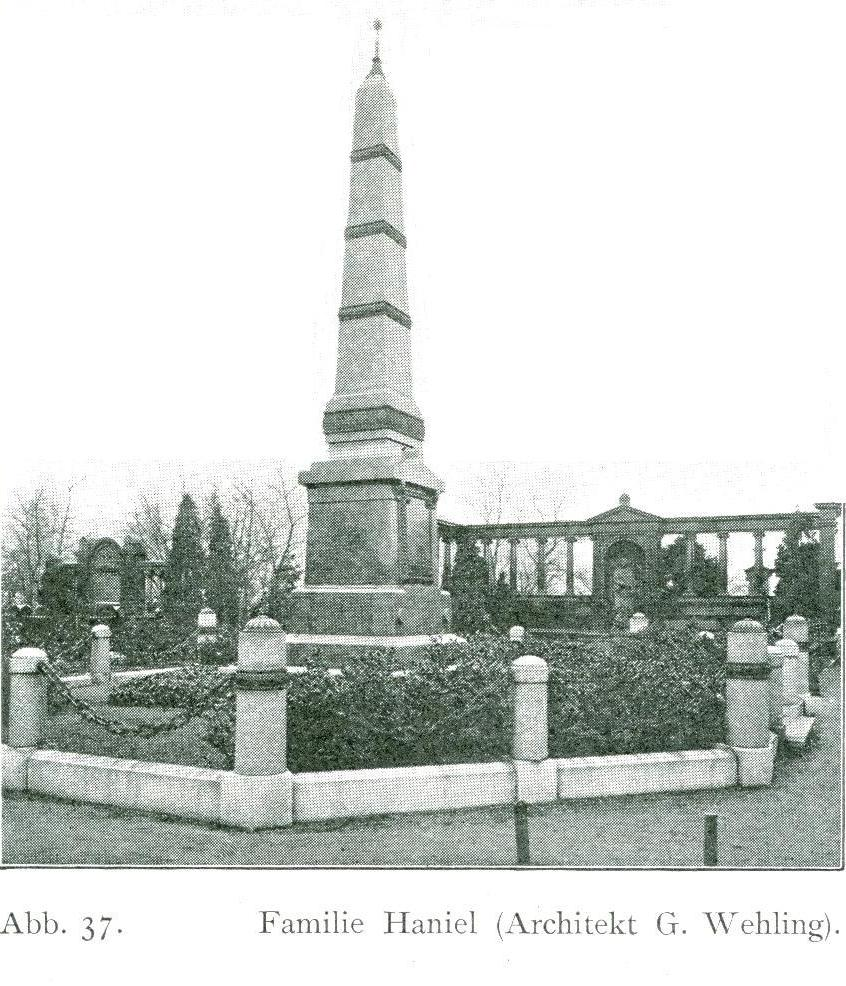
Grave site for the Haniel family

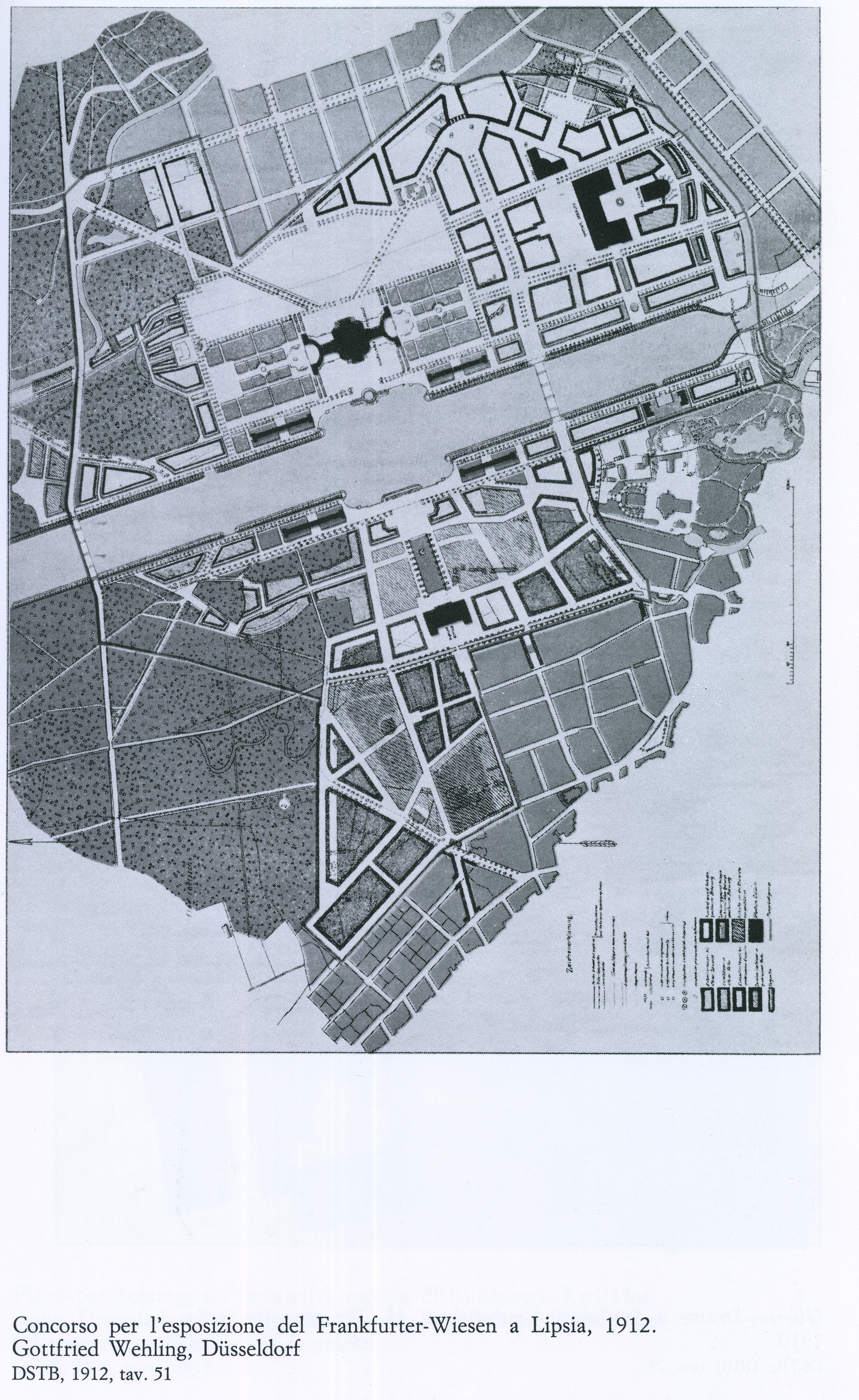
Design for the development of the Frankfurter Wiesen in Leipzig, 1912
