= Otto Erdmann (painter) =

German painter

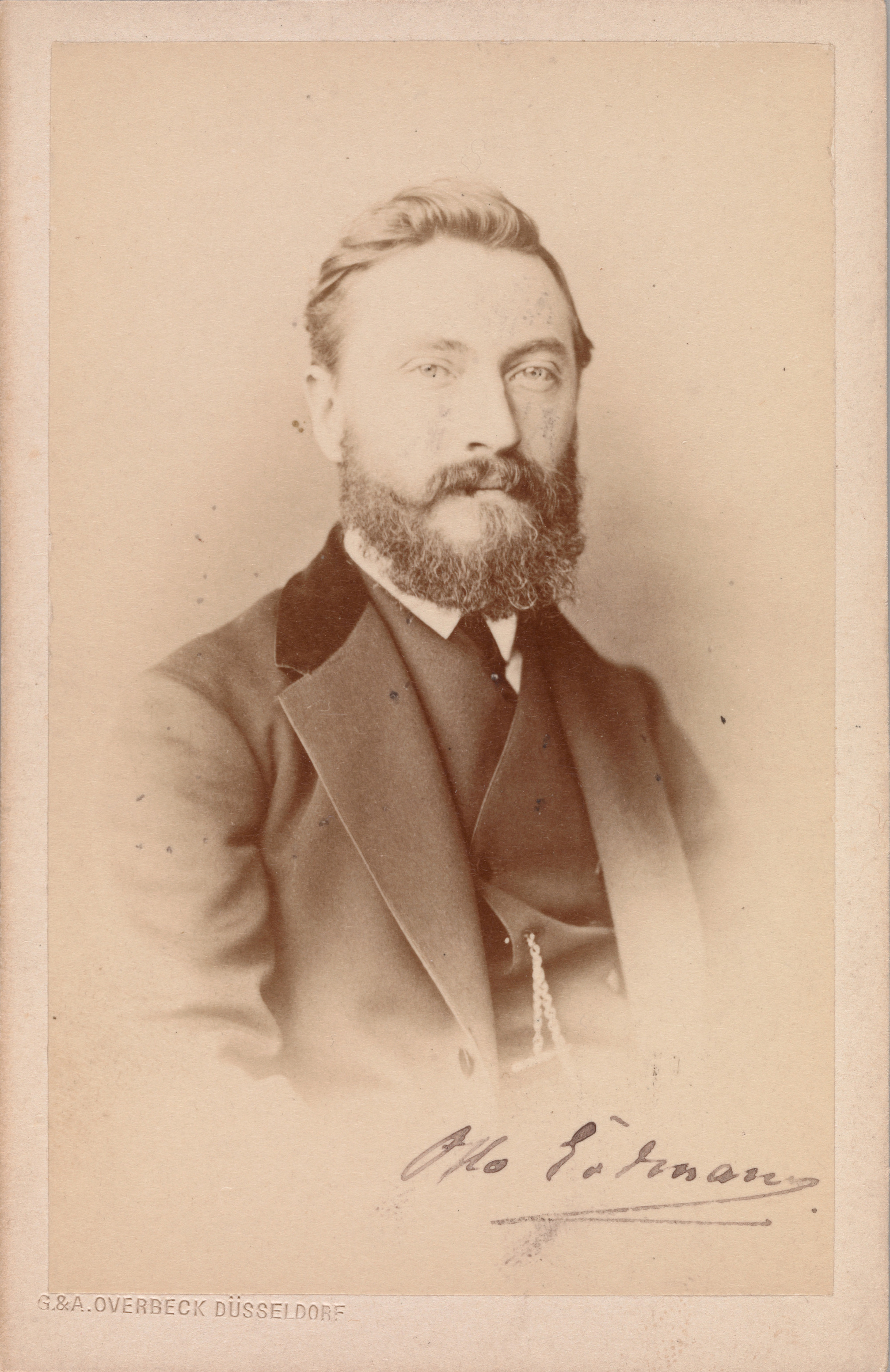
Otto Wilhelm Eduard Erdmann

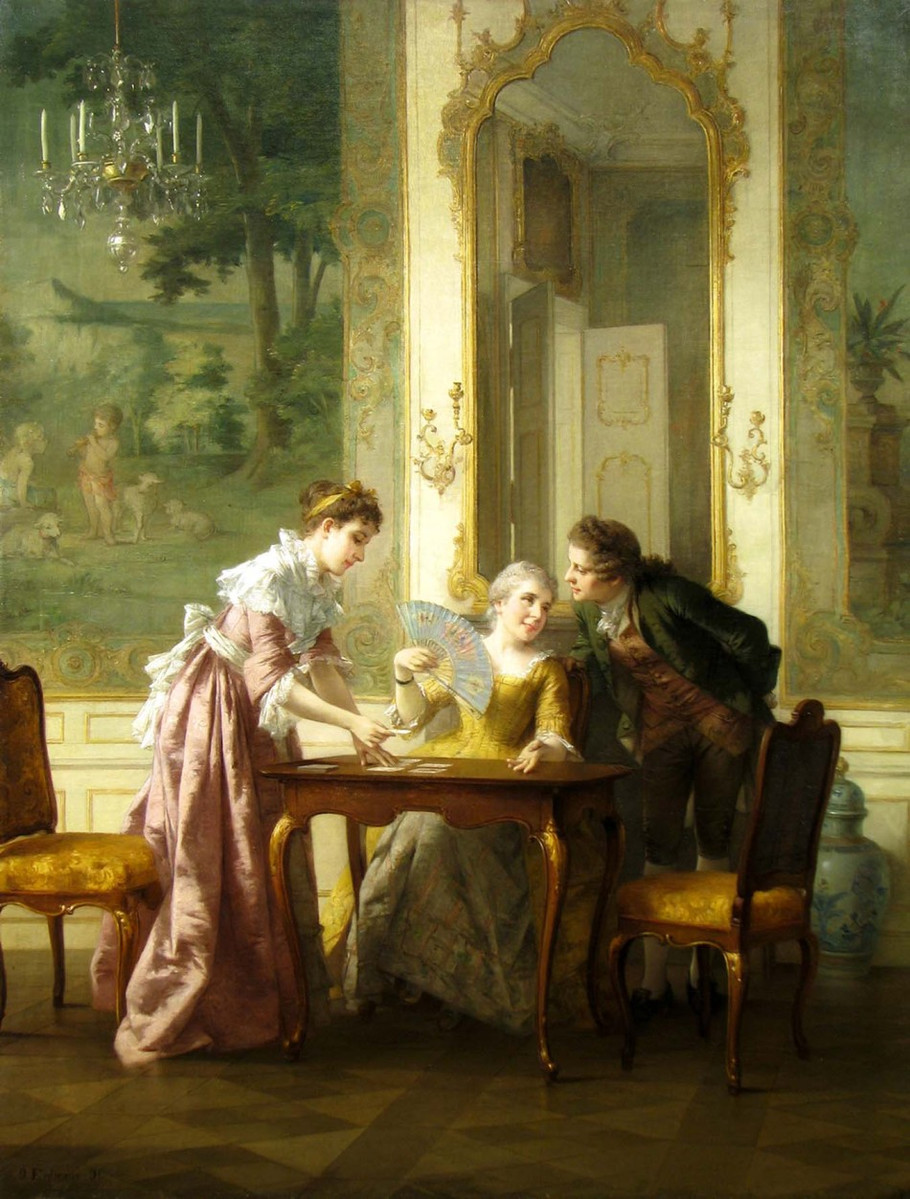
The Card Game

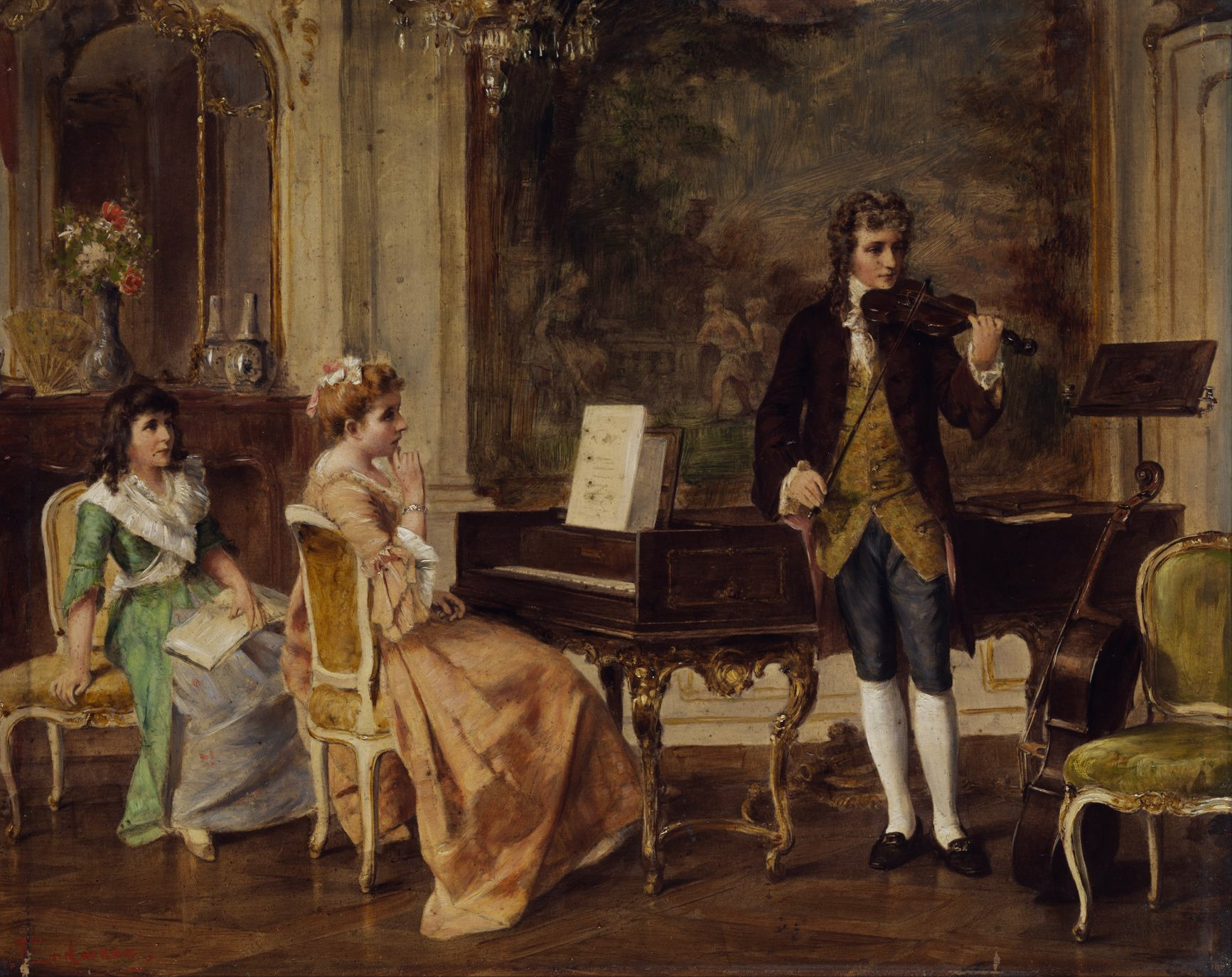
Music

Otto Wilhelm Eduard Erdmann (7 December 1834, Leipzig - 9 December 1905, Düsseldorf) was a German genre painter in the Rococo Revival style.

== Biography ==
His father was the chemist, Otto Linné Erdmann. He began his artistic education at the Leipziger Akademie and later attended the Dresden Academy of Fine Arts, followed by the Academy of Fine Arts, Munich, where he studied with the genre painter, Ludwig von Hagn. In 1858, he settled in Düsseldorf, where he began to specialize in Rococo Revival paintings, largely set in a light-hearted court environment.

He was a member of the artists' association, "Malkasten", and sat on its board of directors for many years. He was also an amateur actor. In 1898, he was awarded the Order of the Red Eagle. In addition to his paintings, he created illustrations; notably for the inaugural edition of the Belgian journal, L'Illustration Européenne in 1870.

== Gallery ==
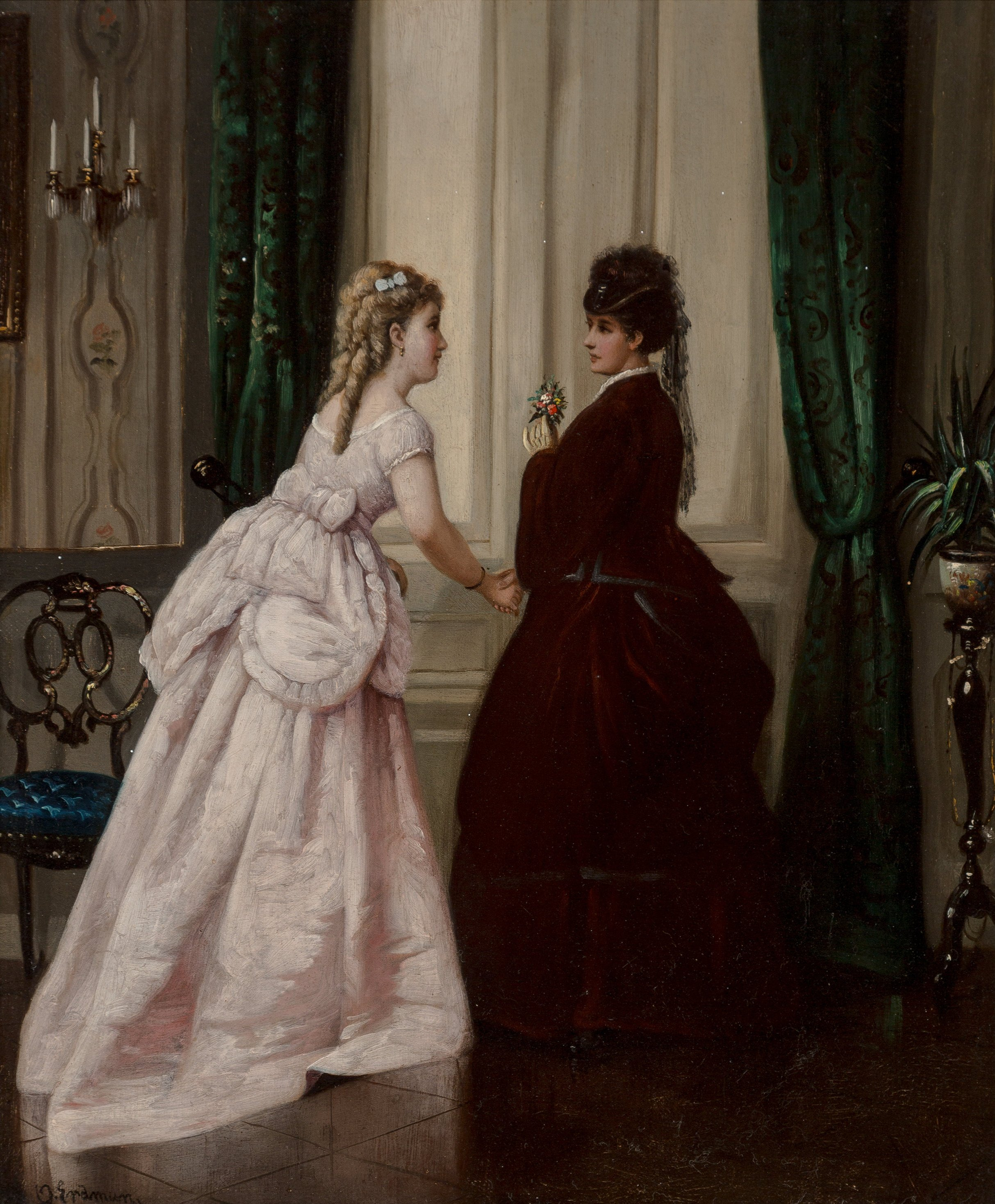
Saying Farewell

Proposal, 1873

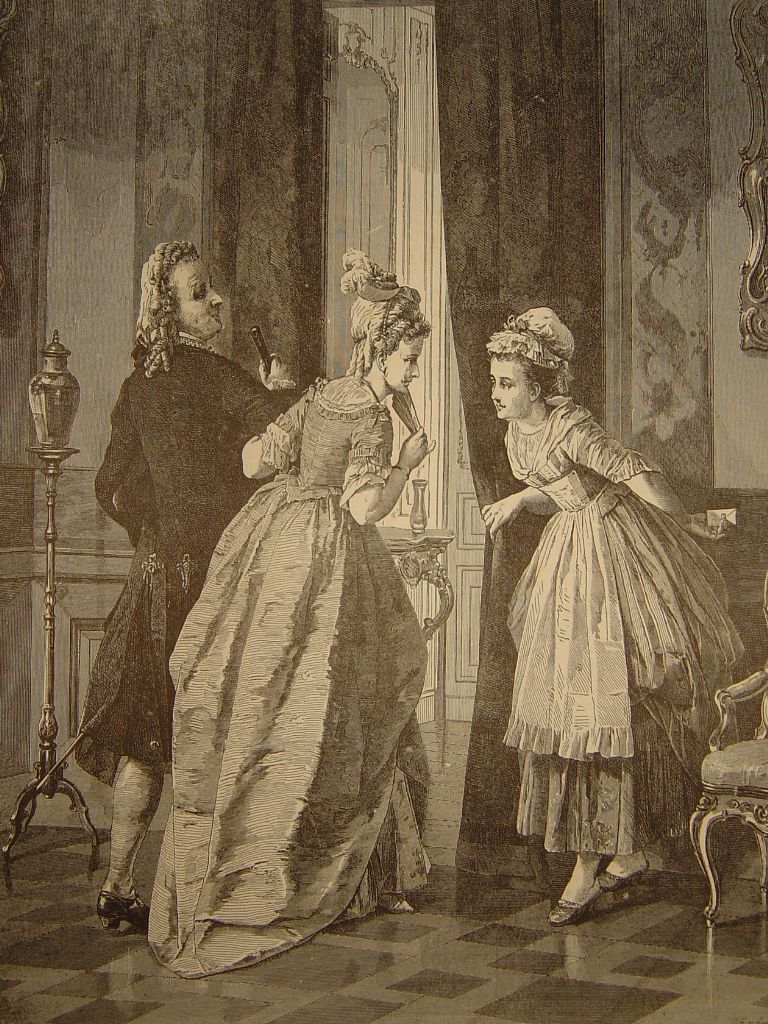
Le message, 1872

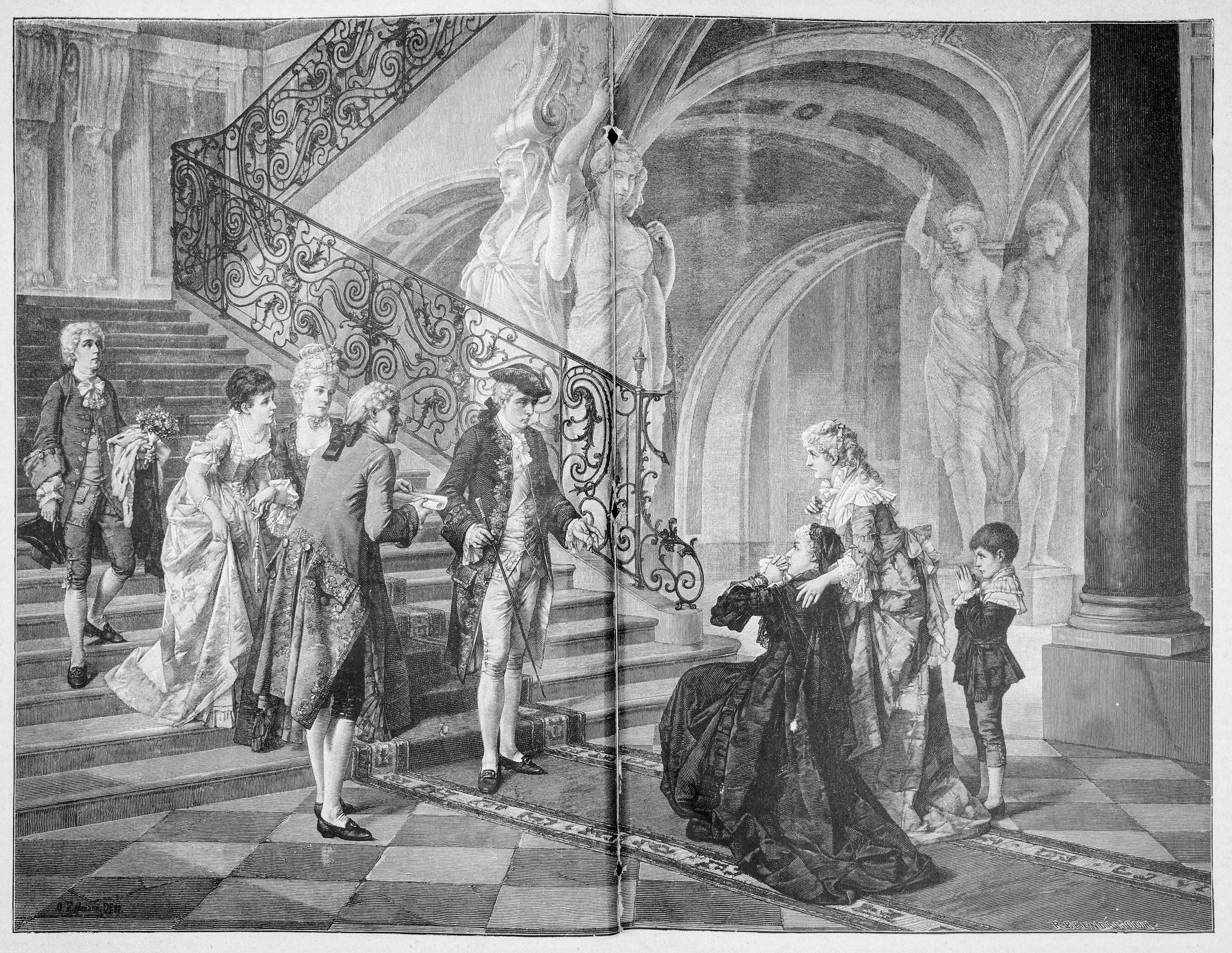
Die Gartenlaube (The Garden Arbor)

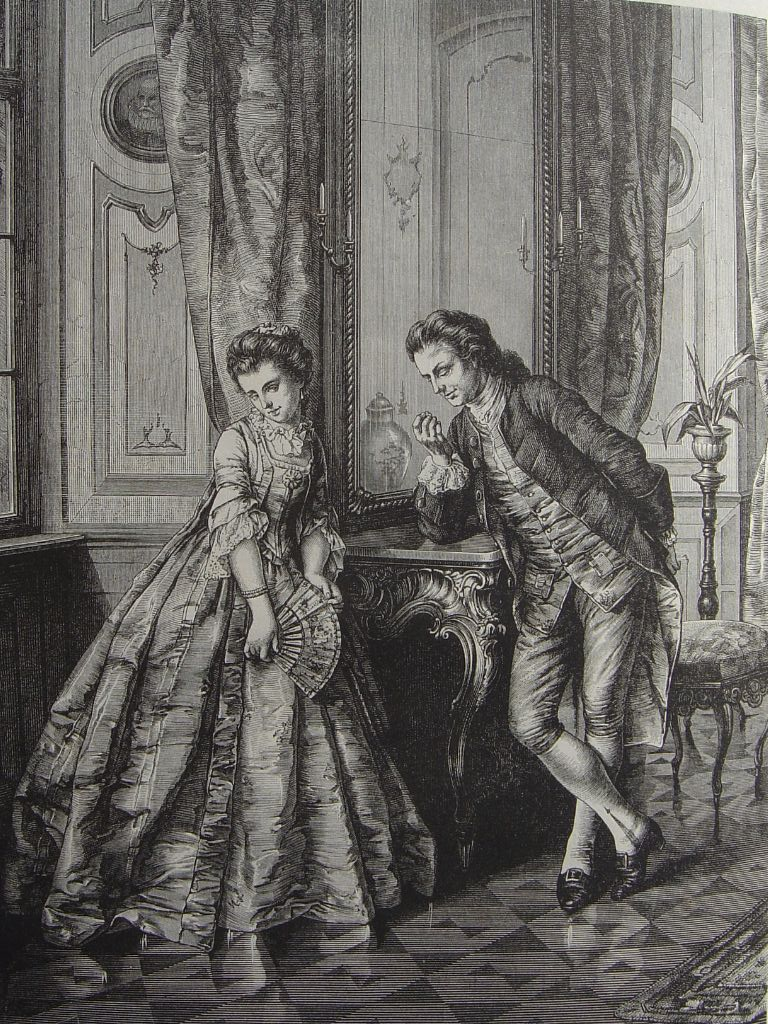
Marriage Proposal

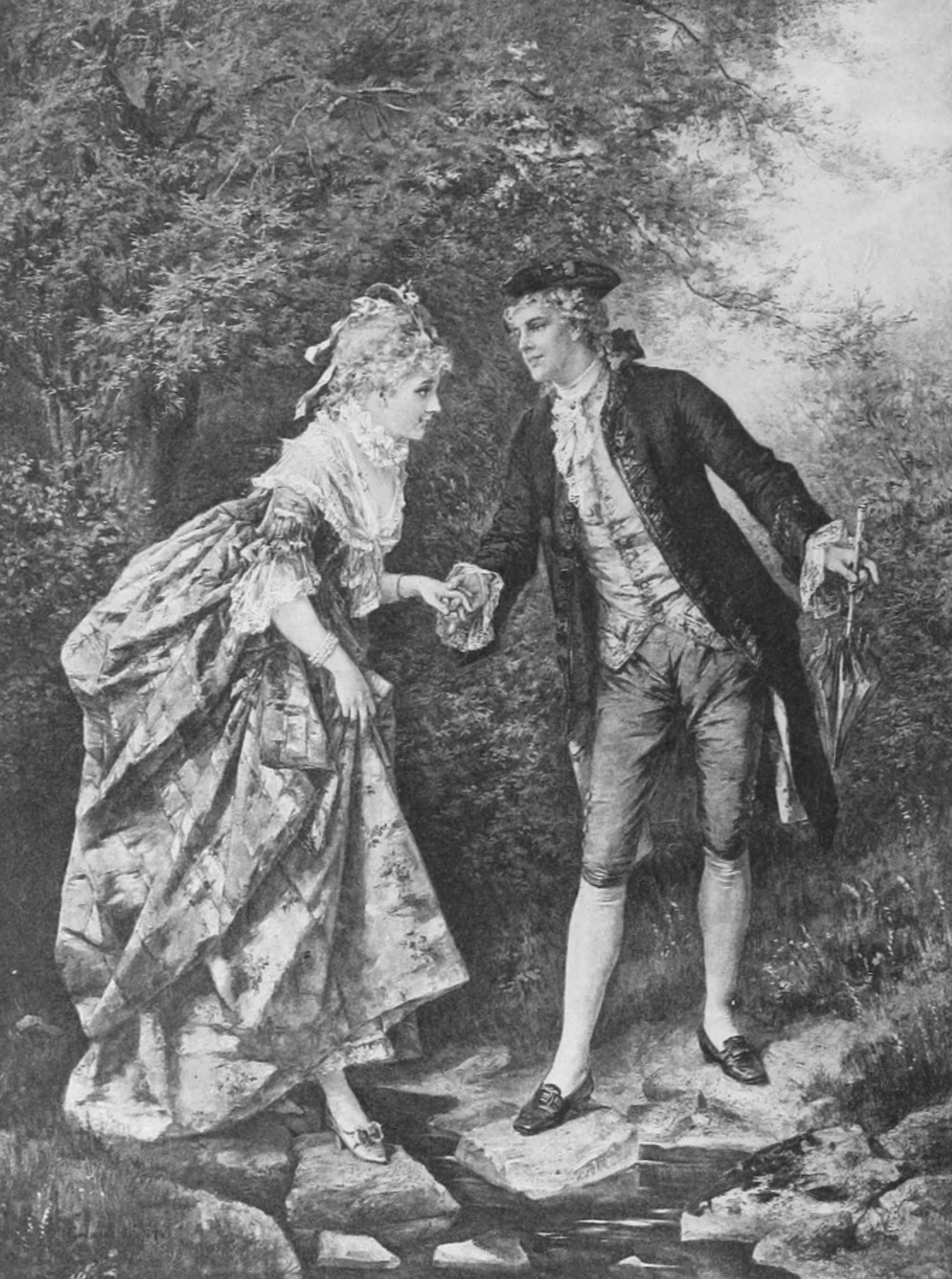
I might soon be rich

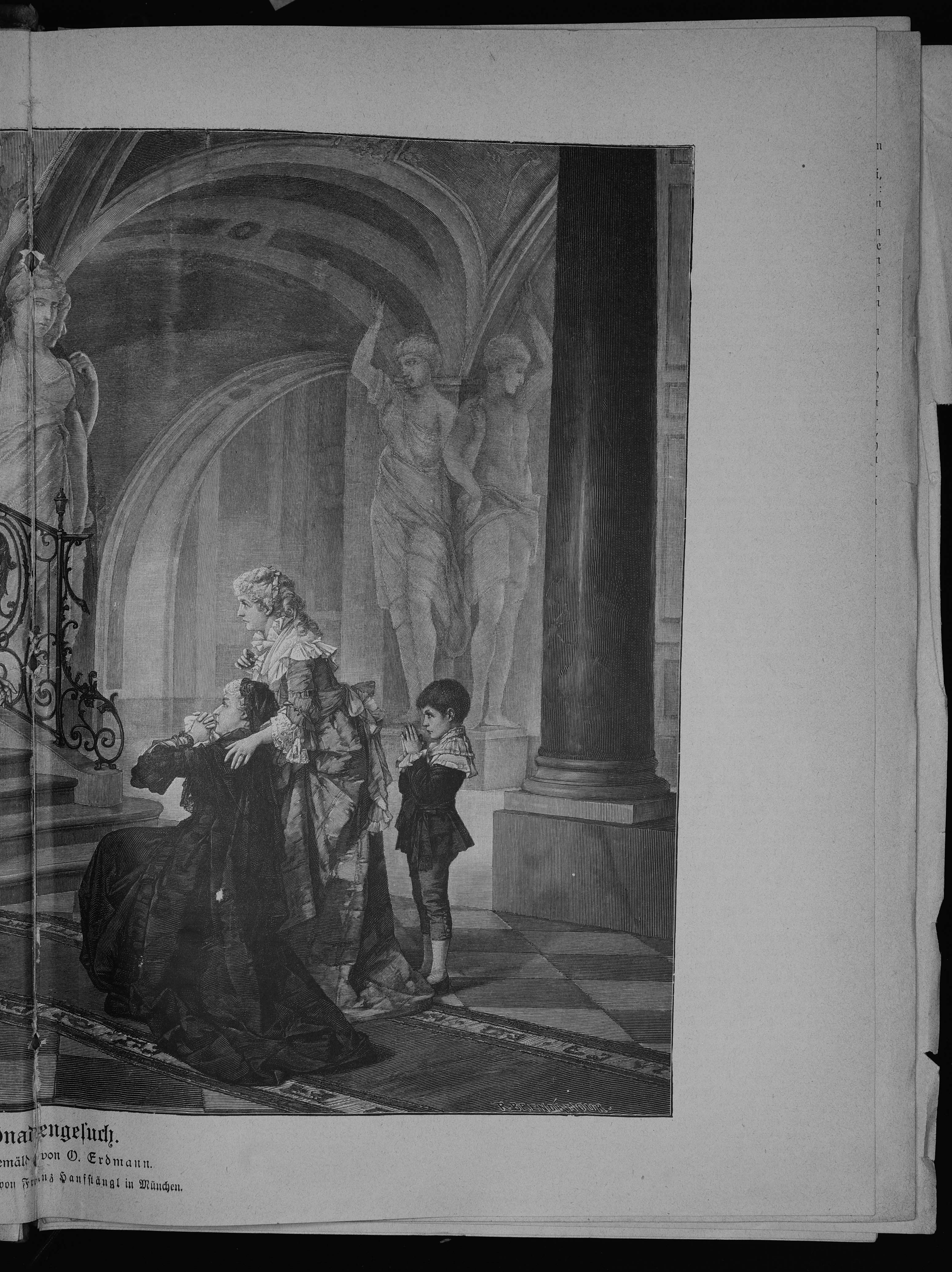
Die Gartenlaube
