= List of Norwegians =

This is a list of notable people from Norway.

== Art ==
=== Literature ===
- Ingvar Ambjørnsen (1956–2025), writer
- Tryggve Andersen, novelist, poet
- Peter Christen Asbjørnsen (1812–1885), writer, folklorist
- Kjell Aukrust, author and illustrator
- Olav Aukrust, poet
- Ari Behn, author; ex-husband of Princess Märtha Louise of Norway
- André Bjerke, poet and author
- Jens Bjørneboe, author and poet
- Bjørnstjerne Bjørnson, poet and author, Nobel Prize in Literature winner
- Ketil Bjørnstad, author, composer, musician
- Johan Bojer, novelist and dramatist
- Johan Borgen, author
- Christian Braunmann Tullin (1728–1765); businessman and poet
- Johan Nordahl Brun (1745–1816); author, poet, dramatist, politician
- Olaf Bull, poet
- Lars Saabye Christensen, author and poet
- Camilla Collett (1813–1895), writer, feminist
- Olav Duun, author
- Tom Egeland, author
- Peter Egge, author, journalist, playwright
- Thorbjørn Egner, playwright, songwriter and illustrator
- Anne Karin Elstad, author
- Kristian Elster, novelist, journalist, literary critic
- Sven Elvestad, journalist and author
- Carl Fredrik Engelstad, writer, playwright, journalist, translator
- Johan Falkberget, author
- Kjartan Fløgstad, author
- Jon Fosse, author, poet and playwright
- Jostein Gaarder, author
- Arne Garborg, author and poet
- Hulda Garborg, poet and author
- Inger Hagerup, author, playwright and poet
- Kjell Hallbing, author
- Knut Hamsun, author of Hunger, Nobel Prize in Literature winner
- Erik Fosnes Hansen, author and poet
- Jørgen Haugan, author and lecturer
- Olav H. Hauge, horticulturist, translator and poet
- Hans Herbjørnsrud, author
- Sigurd Hoel, author
- Ludvig Holberg (1684–1754), historian and playwright
- Henrik Ibsen, playwright and poet, author of A Doll's House
- Sigurd Ibsen, author and politician
- Roy Jacobsen, author
- Rolf Jacobsen, poet
- Alexander Kielland, author
- Jan Kjærstad, author
- Karl Ove Knausgård, novelist, author of My Struggle
- Thomas Krag, novelist, playwright
- Vilhelm Krag, poet
- Trude Brænne Larssen, author
- Henry Lawson, author
- Bernt Lie, novelist
- Jonas Lie, author
- Jørgen Moe, folklorist
- Lise Myhre, cartoonist
- Dagne Groven Myhren, literature researcher
- Jo Nesbø, author
- Christopher Nielsen, cartoonist
- Sigbjørn Obstfelder, writer and poet
- Alf Prøysen, author, poet, folk singer and entertainer
- Nini Roll Anker, novelist, playwright
- Margit Sandemo, author
- Aksel Sandemose, author
- Gabriel Scott, poet, novelist, playwright and children's writer
- Amalie Skram, writer, feminist
- Dag Solstad, author
- Marta Steinsvik, author
- Edvard Storm, poet, songwriter, educator
- Jens Tvedt, novelist, writer
- Sigrid Undset, author of Kristin Lavransdatter, Nobel Prize in Literature winner
- Halldis Moren Vesaas, poet and author
- Tarjei Vesaas, author and poet
- Jan Erik Vold, lyric poet
- Aasmund Olavsson Vinje, poet and author
- Herbjørg Wassmo, author
- Johan Sebastian Welhaven, poet
- Henrik Wergeland, poet
- Johan Herman Wessel, poet
- Peter Wessel Zapffe, writer and philosopher
- Knut Ødegård, author
- Finn Øglænd, author
- Frode Øverli, cartoonist

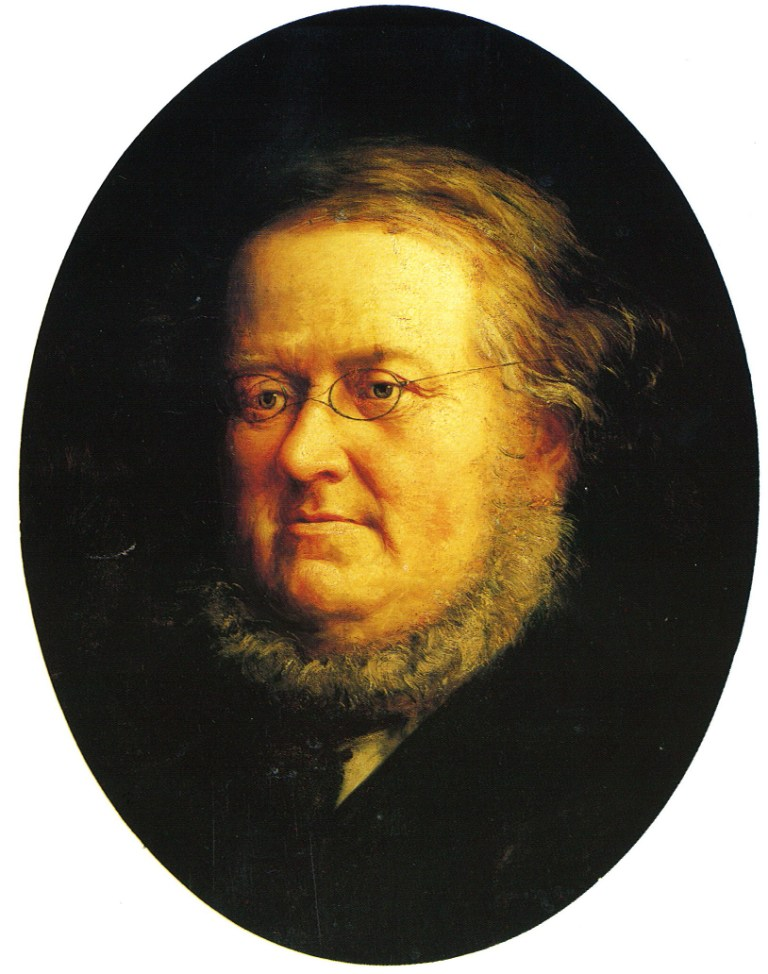
Asbjørnsen

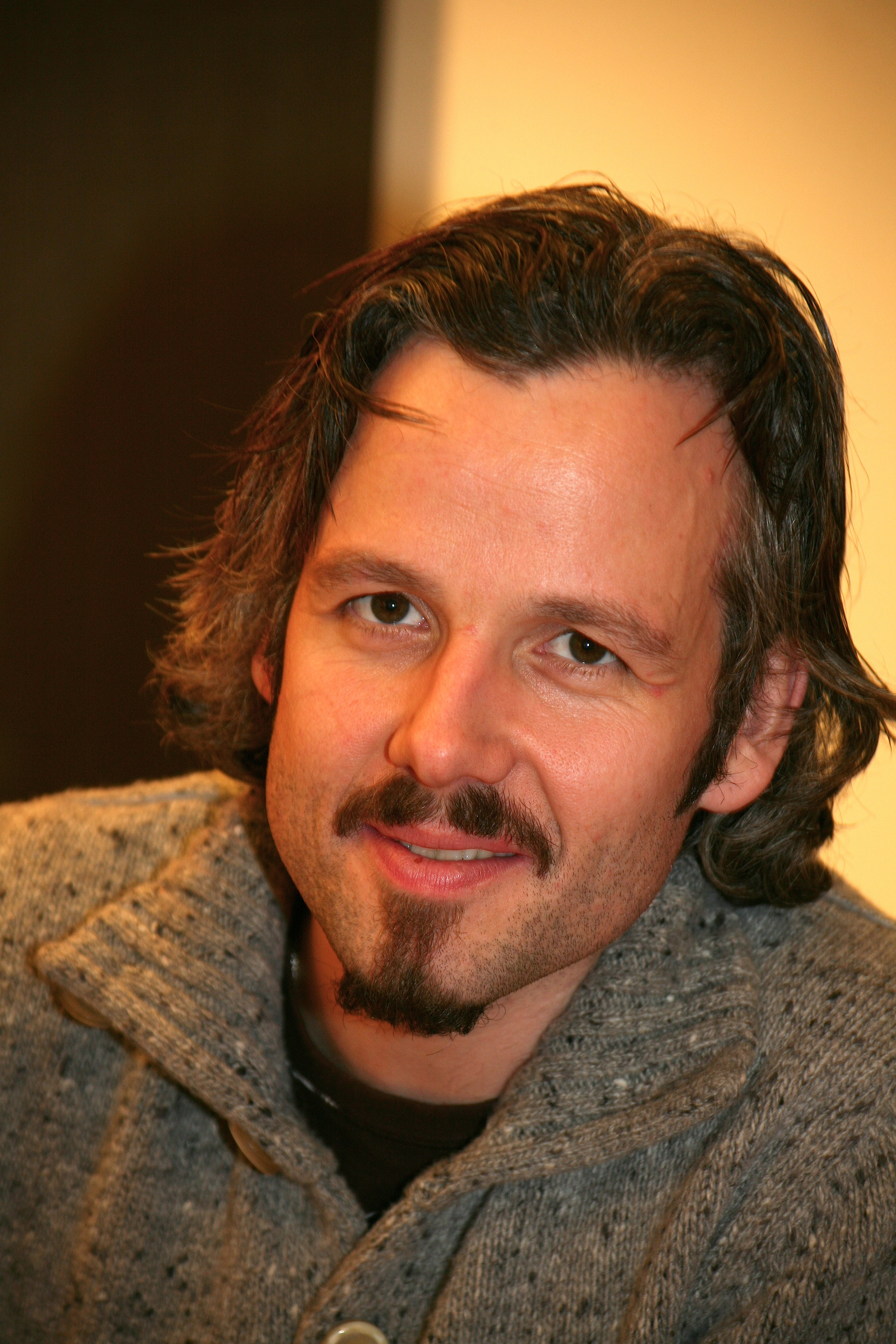
Behn

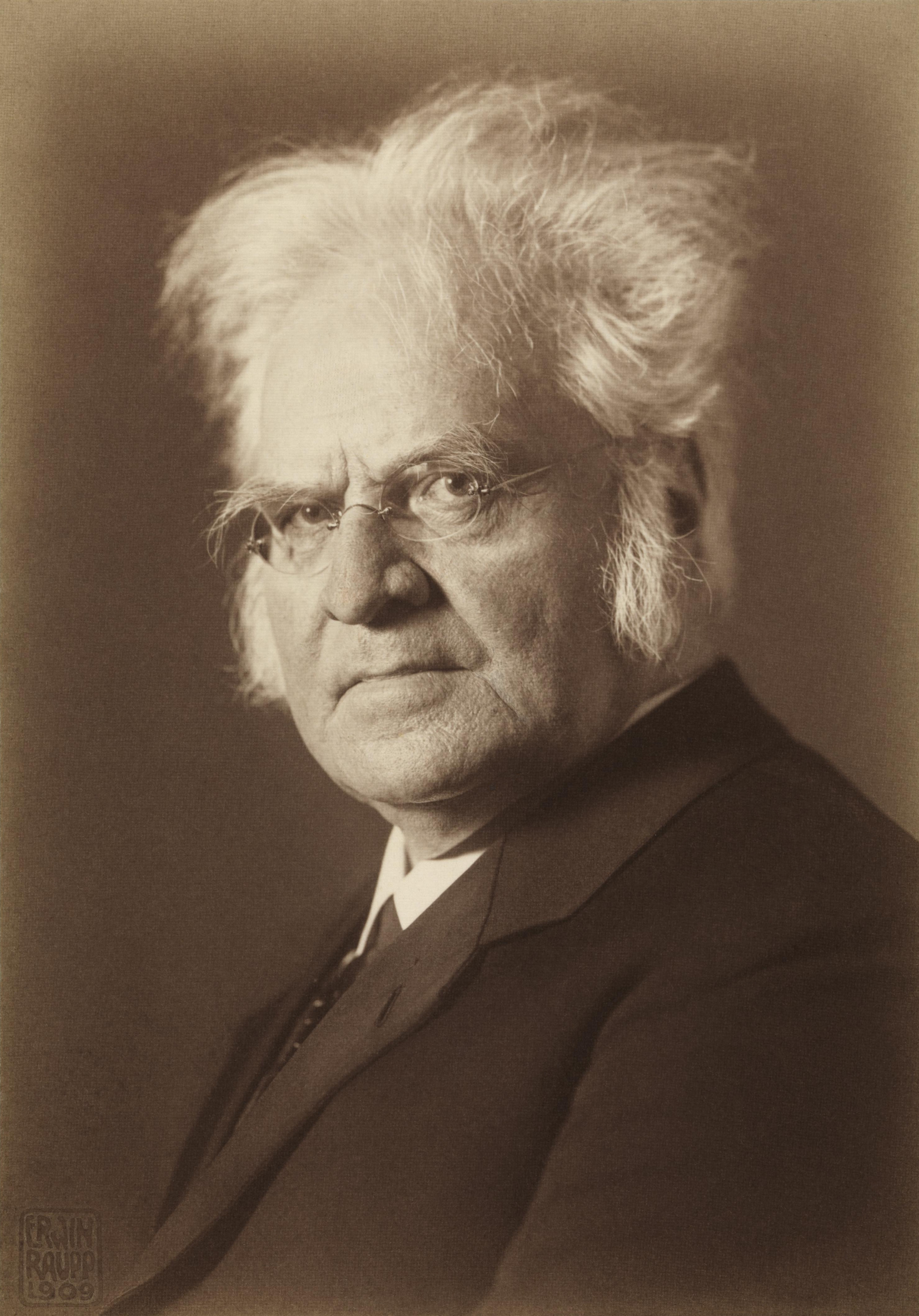
Bjørnson

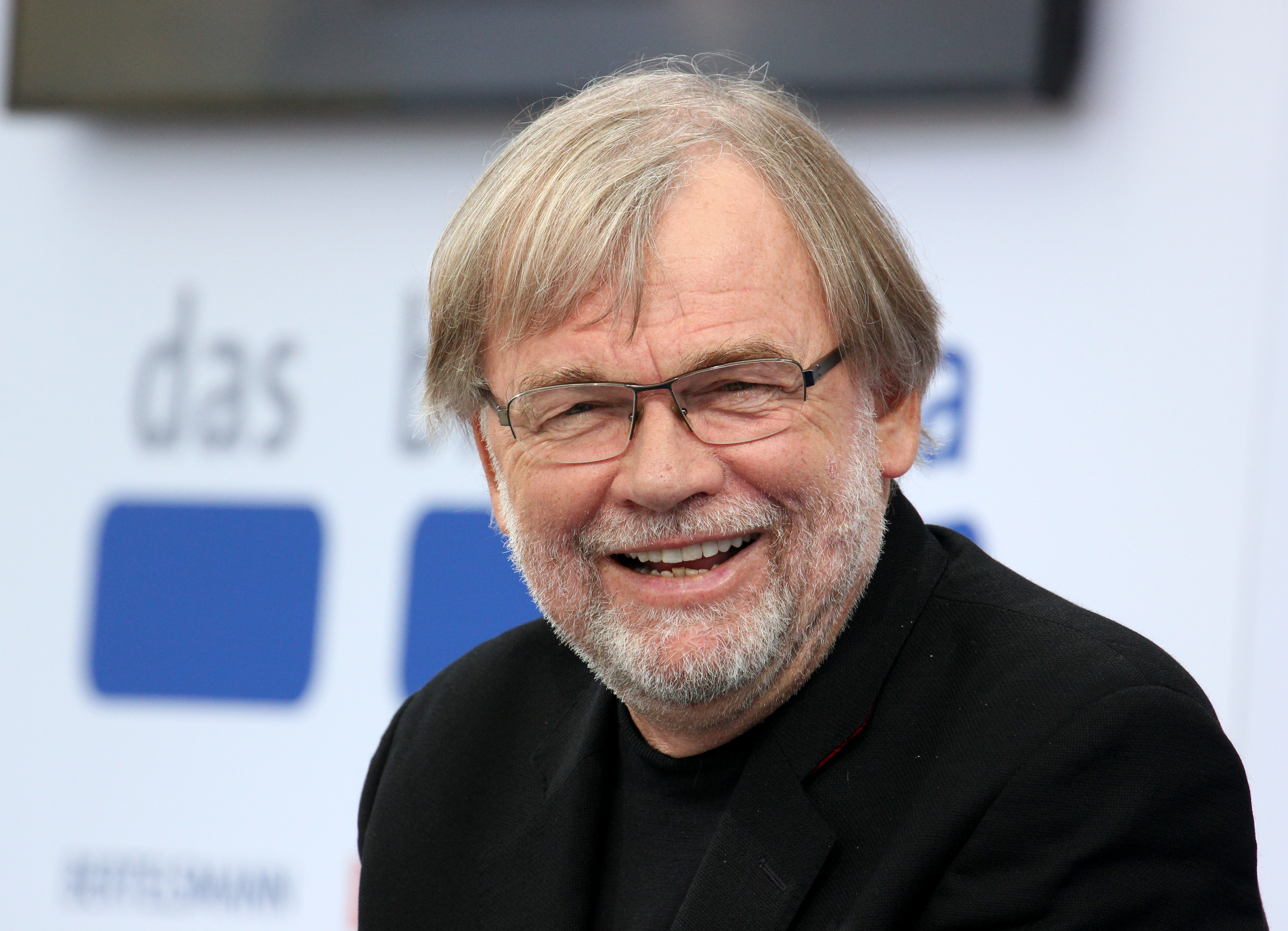
Gaarder

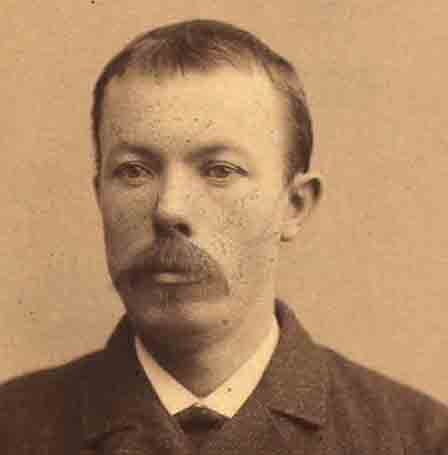
Garborg

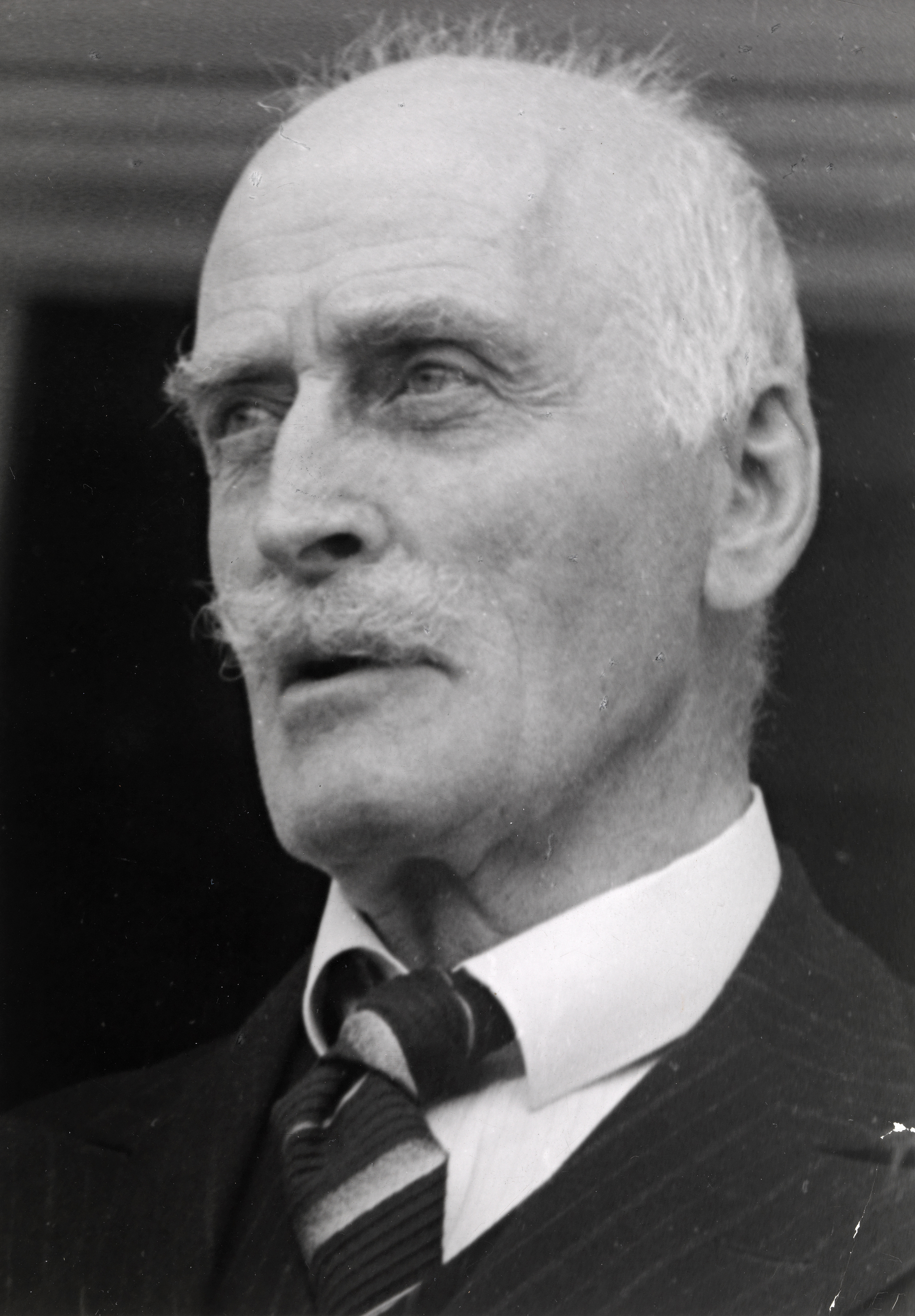
Hamsun

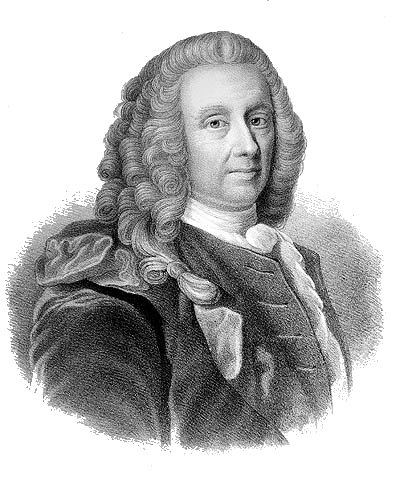
Holberg

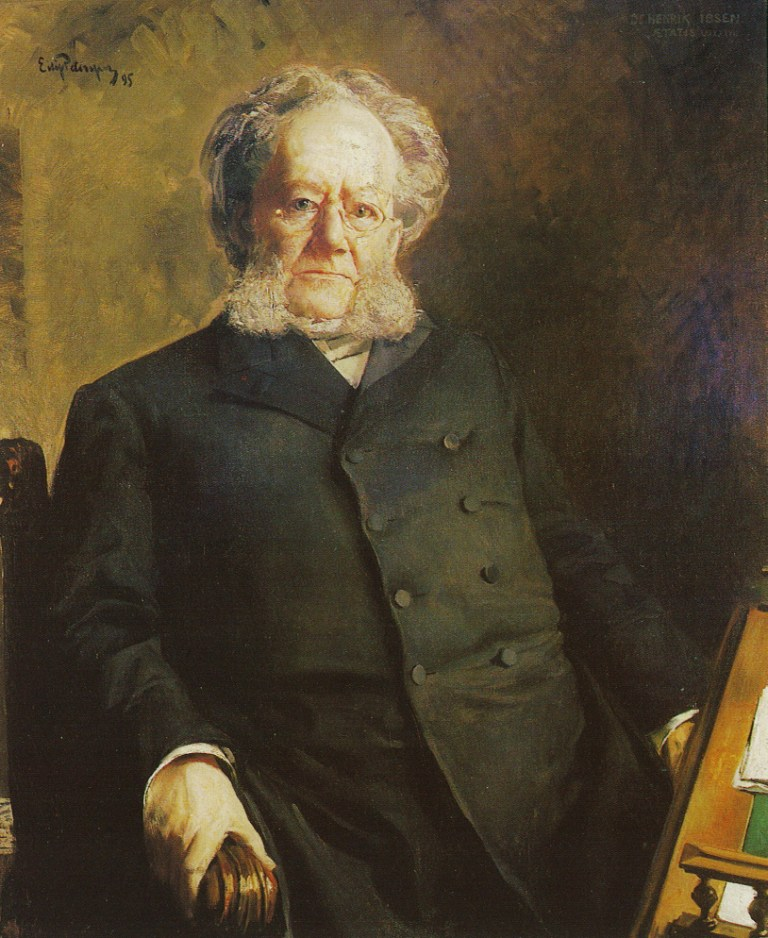
Ibsen

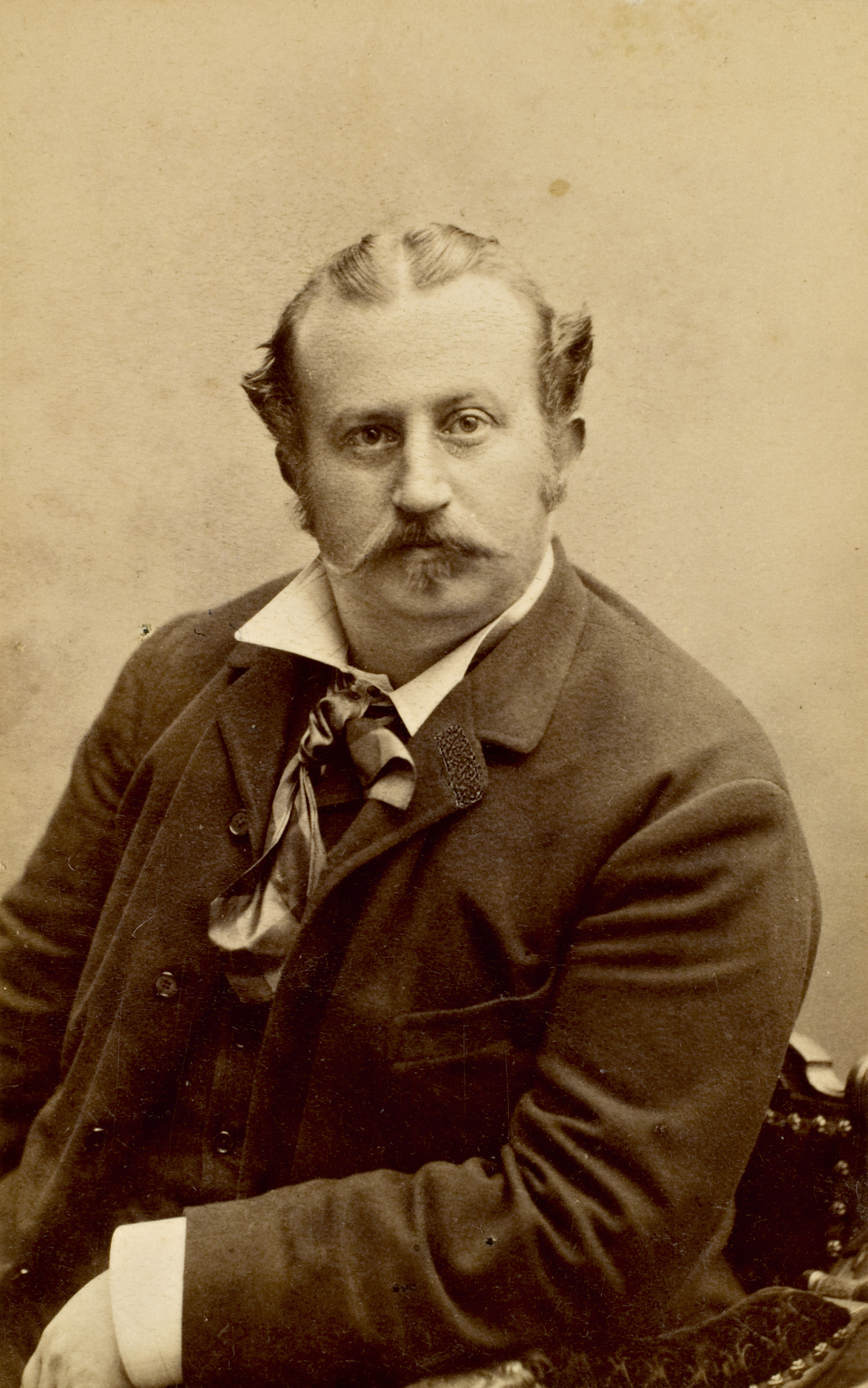
Kielland

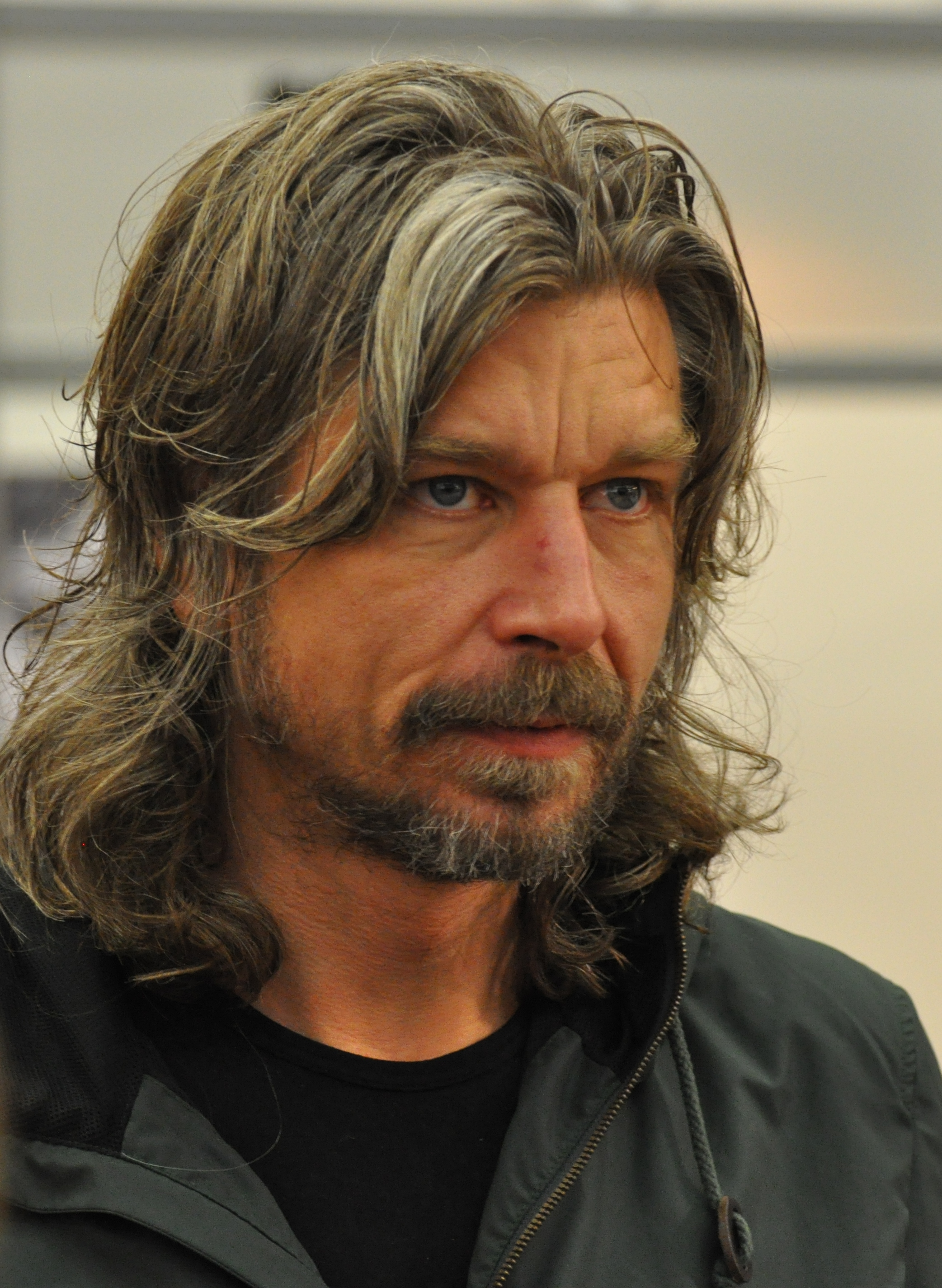
Knausgård

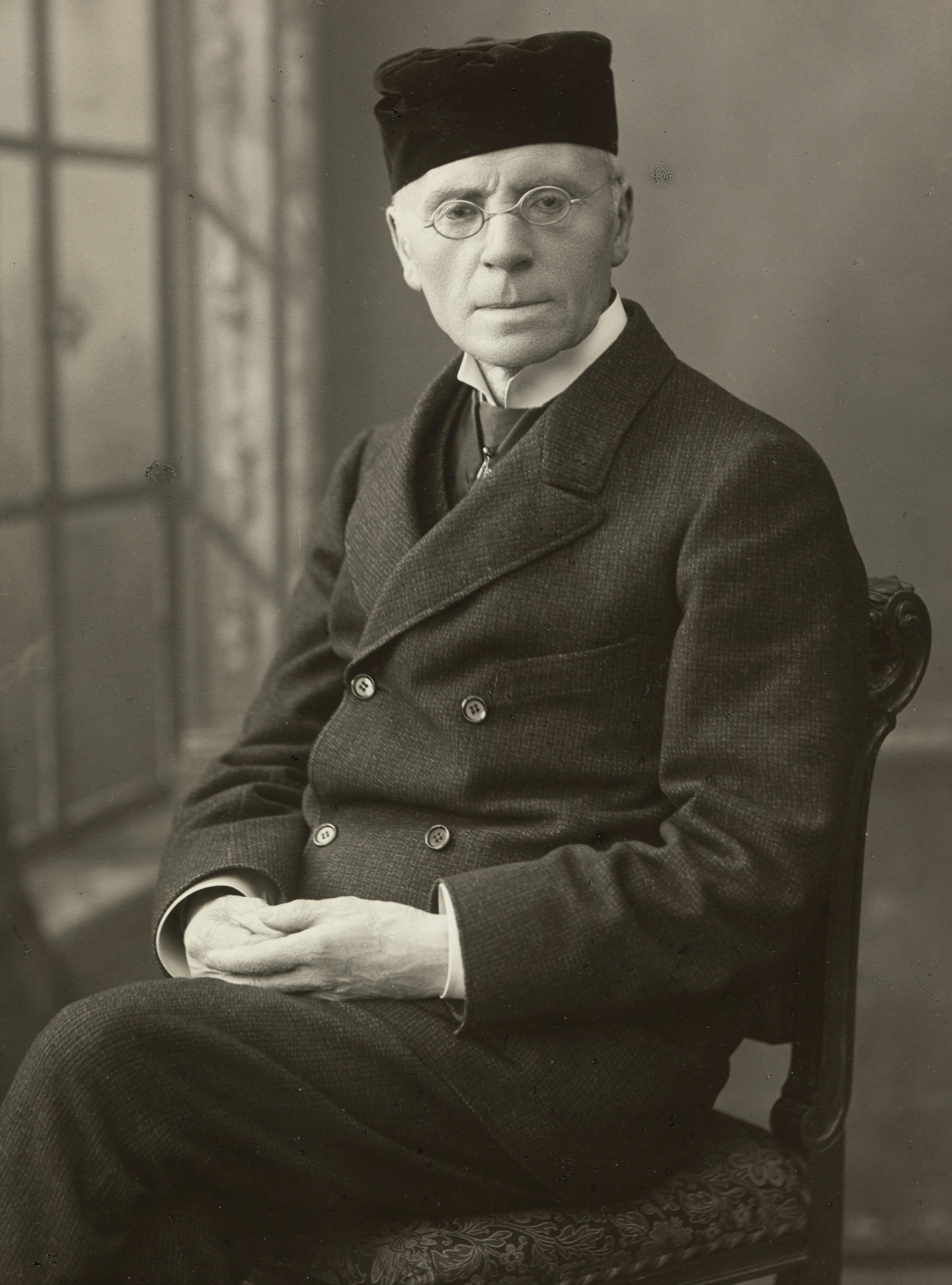
Lie

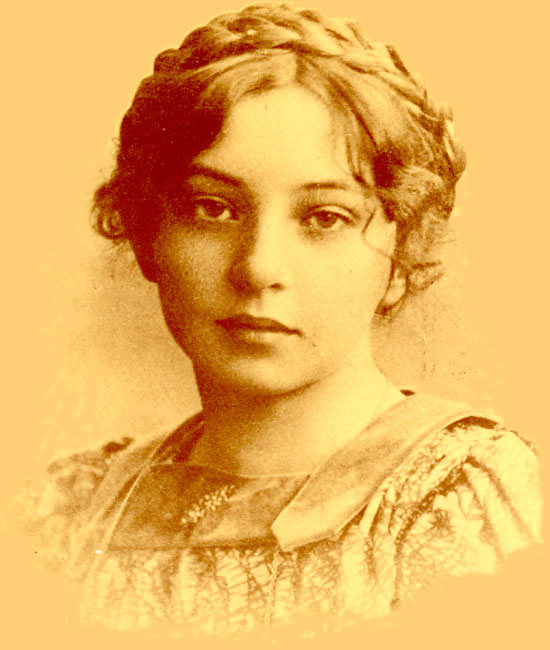
Undset

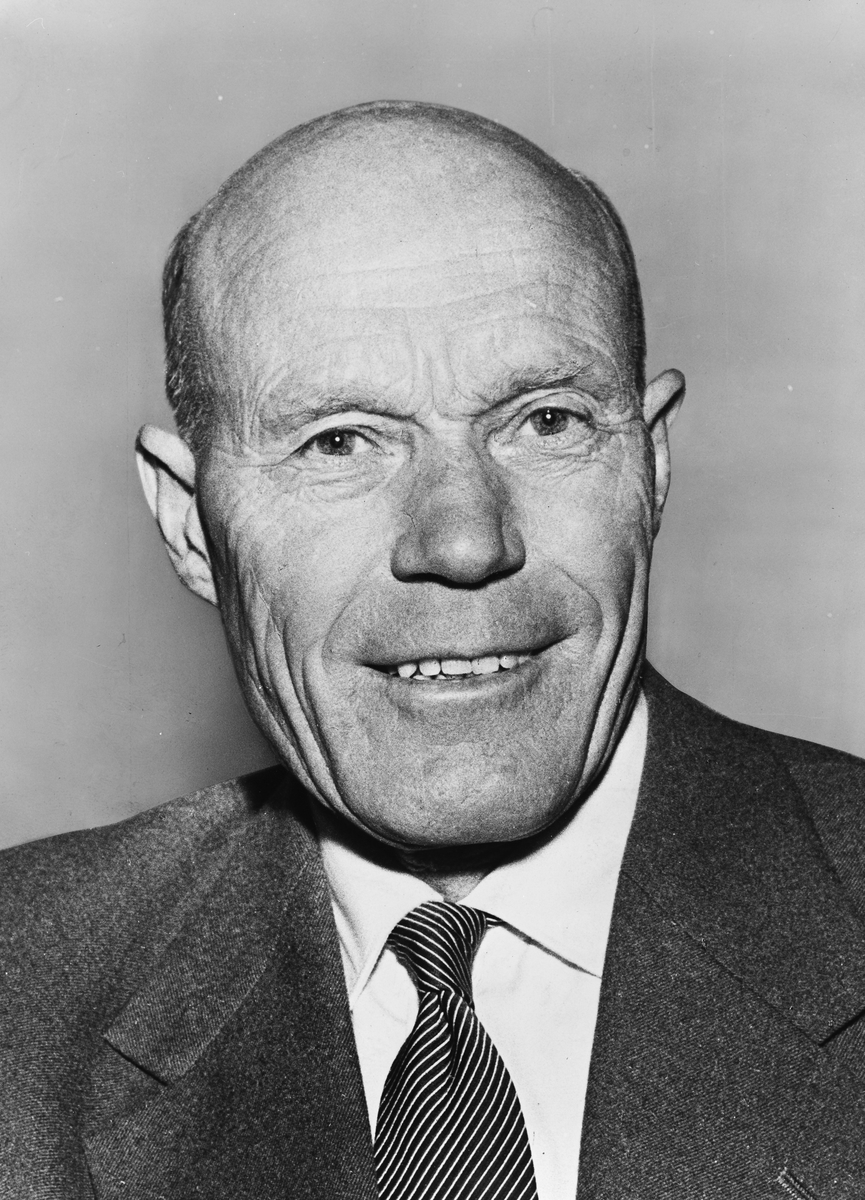
Vesaas

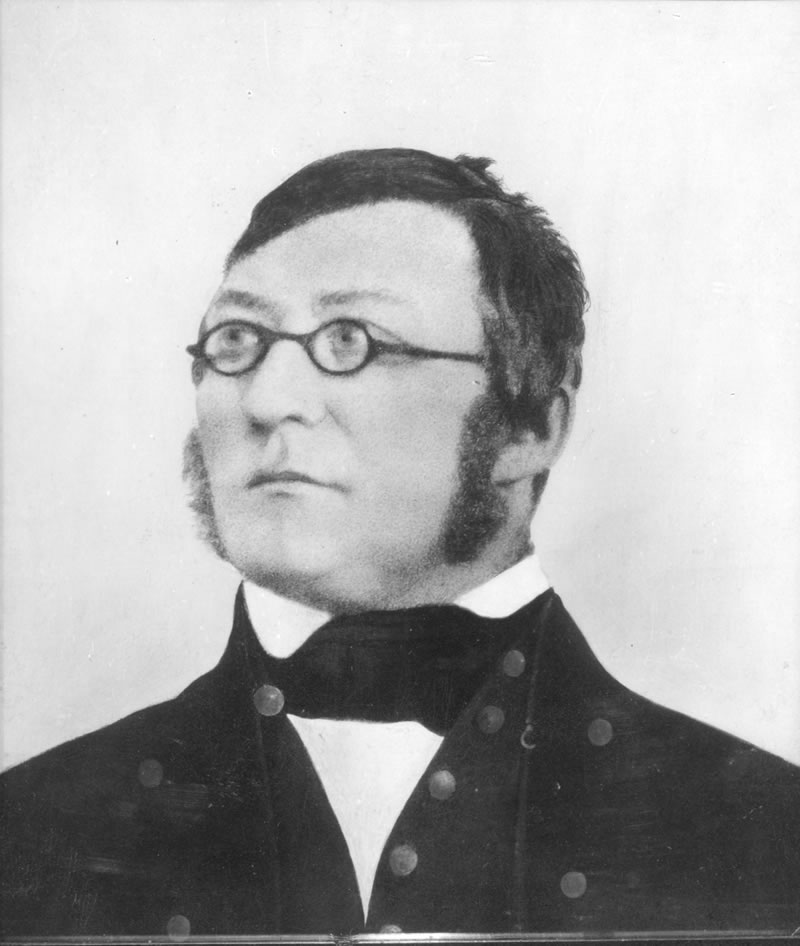
Wergeland

=== Music ===
- Kyle Alessandro,singer-songwriter
- Morten Abel, musician (Mods, Peltz, The September When, Solo)
- Ivar F. Andresen, basso profundo opera singer
- Astrid S (real name Astrid Smeplass), singer-songwriter
- Savant, musician (edm, real name Aleksander Vinter)
- Svein Berge, musician (Röyksopp)
- Margaret Berger, singer-songwriter
- Jarle Bernhoft, singer-songwriter
- Geir Botnen, pianist
- Ole Bull, violinist, composer
- Thomas Dybdahl, singer-songwriter
- Euronymous (real name Øystein Aarseth), musician (Mayhem)
- Fenriz (real name Gylve Nagell), musician, metal guru (Darkthrone)
- Kirsten Flagstad, soprano
- Magne Furuholmen, keyboardist and songwriter (a-ha)
- Gaahl (real name Kristian Espedal), singer (Gorgoroth)
- Anja Garbarek, singer-songwriter
- Jan Garbarek, musician
- Håvard Gimse, classical pianist
- Ernst Glaser, violinist
- Gottfried von der Goltz, violinist, conductor
- Edvard Grieg, composer
- Eivind Groven, composer
- Sigmund Groven, harmonica virtuoso, composer
- Lona Gyldenkrone (1848–1934), opera singer
- Johan Halvorsen, composer
- Morten Harket, singer
- Björn Haugan, opera singer
- Dag-Are Haugan, electronic musician
- Ian Haugland, drummer (Europe)
- Kate Havnevik, singer-songwriter, composer, musician, pianist, guitarist, melodica player
- Hank von Helvete (real name Hans Erik Husby), singer (Turbonegro)
- Tone Groven Holmboe, composer
- Wilhelmine Holmboe-Schenström (1842–1939), opera singer
- Tom Hugo, singer
- Carl Høgset, conductor (Grex Vocalis)
- Ihsahn (real name Vegard Sverre Tveitan), musician (Emperor)
- Christian Ingebrigtsen singer-songwriter for A1
- David Monrad Johansen, composer
- Deeyah Khan, singer, film director, music producer, composer, and human rights defender
- Roy Khan, singer (Kamelot)
- Olav Kielland, conductor, composer
- Henning Kraggerud, violinist
- Solveig Kringlebotn, soprano
- Trond Kverno, composer
- Girl in Red (Real name Marie Ulven Ringheim), singer, songwriter
- Sissel Kyrkjebø, singer
- Jørn Lande, singer
- Andy LaPlegua, DJ
- Marit Larsen, singer-songwriter
- Ronni Le Tekrø, musician and guitarist
- Sondre Lerche, singer-songwriter
- Herman Severin Løvenskiold, composer of La Sylphide ballet
- Rolf Løvland, musician (Secret Garden)
- Anni-Frid Lyngstad, lead singer (ABBA)
- Lene Marlin, singer-songwriter
- Tom Mathisen, humorist singer
- Maria Mena, singer-songwriter
- Egil Monn-Iversen, composer
- Truls Mørk, cellist
- Henny Mürer, choreographer and dancer
- Øyvind Mustaparta, musician (Dimmu Borgir)
- Wenche Myhre, singer
- Necrobutcher (real name Jørn Stubberud), musician (Mayhem)
- Lars Nedland, musician (Solefald)
- Joachim Nielsen a.k.a. Jokke, rock singer, poet
- Kurt Nilsen, pop singer (World Idol winner)
- Nocturno Culto (real name Ted Skjellum), musician (Darkthrone)
- Arne Nordheim, modernist composer
- Rikard Nordraak, composer
- John Norum, guitarist (Europe)
- Lene Nystrøm, pop singer (Aqua)
- Opaque (real name Morten Aasdahl Eliassen), rapper
- Tord Øverland-Knudsen, bassist (The Wombats)
- Erlend Øye, musician (Kings of Convenience)
- Ole Paus, singer-songwriter
- Alf Prøysen, author and musician
- Marion Raven, singer-songwriter
- Hans Rotmo, singer-songwriter
- Kari Rueslåtten, singer
- Alexander Rybak, singer, actor, violinist, pianist, composer (Eurovision song contest winner 2009)
- Terje Rypdal, guitarist, composer
- Gisle Saga, music producer, songwriter
- Samoth (real name Tomas Haugen), musician (Emperor)
- Knut Schreiner, musician (Turbonegro, Euroboys)
- Sigrid, singer-songwriter
- Berit Skjefte (1809–1899), langeleik performer
- Magna Lykseth-Skogman (1874–1948), Norwegian-born Swedish opera singer
- Gjendine Slålien (1871–1972), folk singer
- Njål Sparbo, singer
- Vibeke Stene, singer (ex-Tristania)
- Alexander Stenerud, singer-songwriter (Zuma)
- Øystein Sunde, singer, guitarist
- Johan Svendsen, composer
- Harald Sæverud, composer
- Tommy Tee (real name Tommy Flaaten), rapper, producer, DJ
- Jahn Teigen, singer
- Arve Tellefsen, violin virtuoso
- Stian Thoresen, singer (Dimmu Borgir)
- Geirr Tveitt, composer
- Varg Vikernes, musician (Burzum) and convicted murderer
- Paul Waaktaar-Savoy, songwriter and guitarist (a-ha)
- Alan Walker, DJ and producer
- Toki Wartooth, guitarist (Dethklok)
- Sigurd Wongraven, singer-guitarist (Satyricon)
- Erlend Øye, musician
- Aurora Aksnes, singer-songwriter

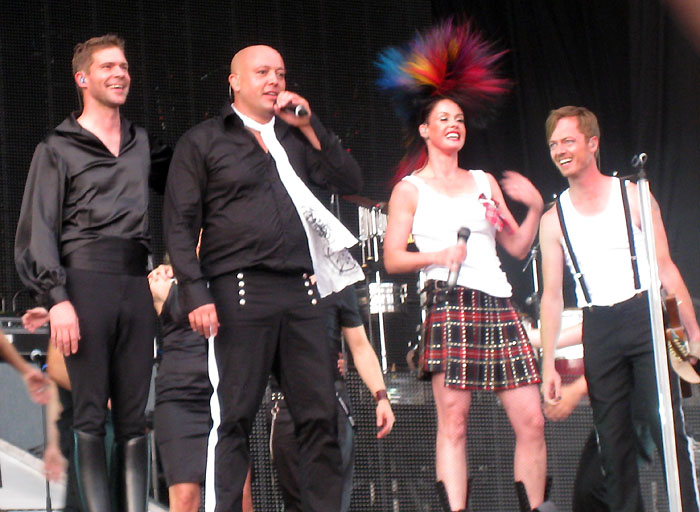
Aqua

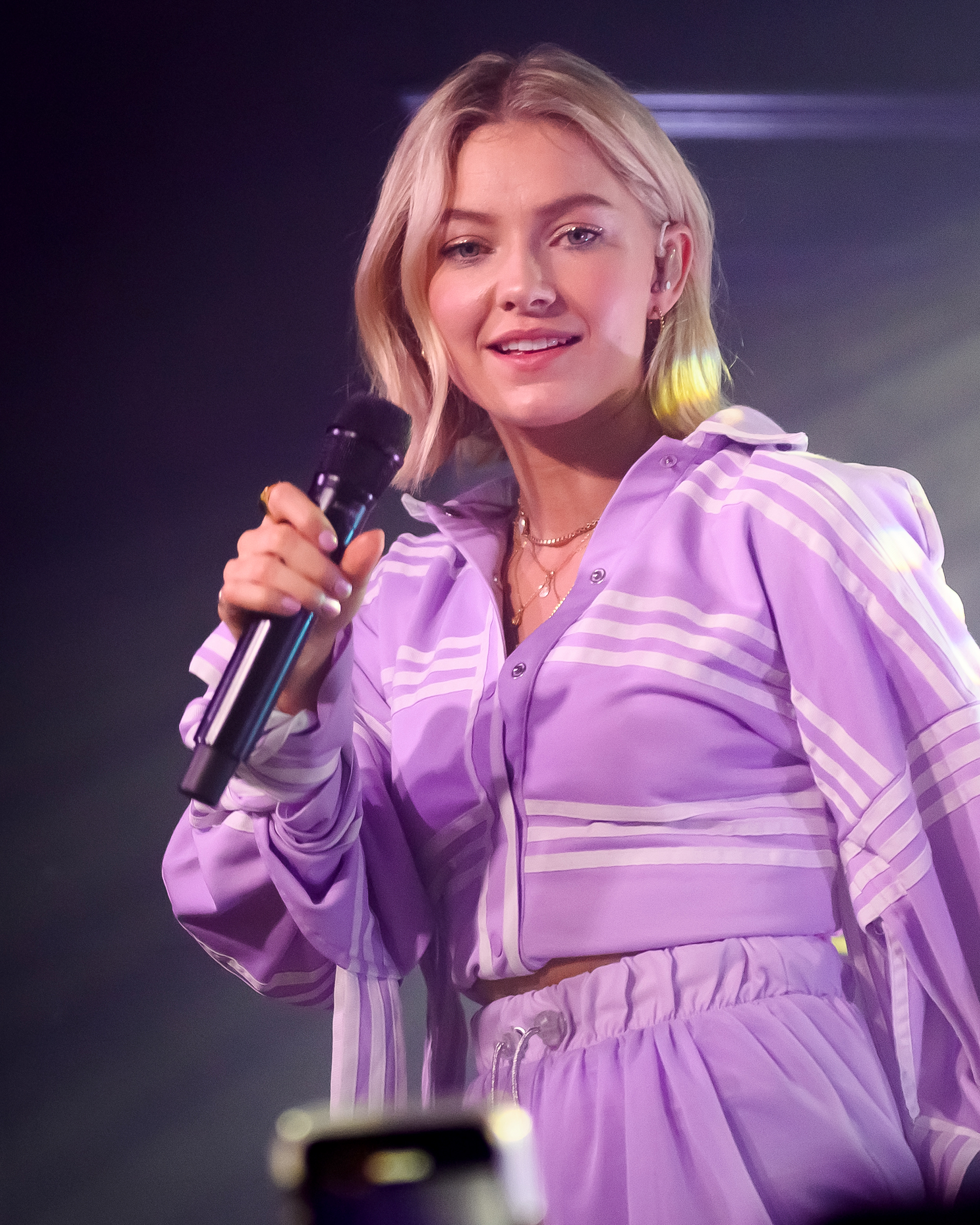
Astrid S

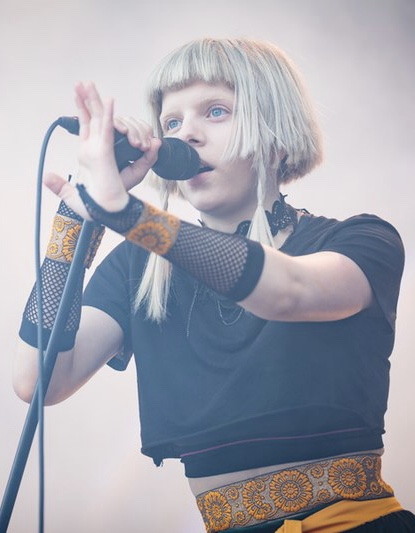
Aurora

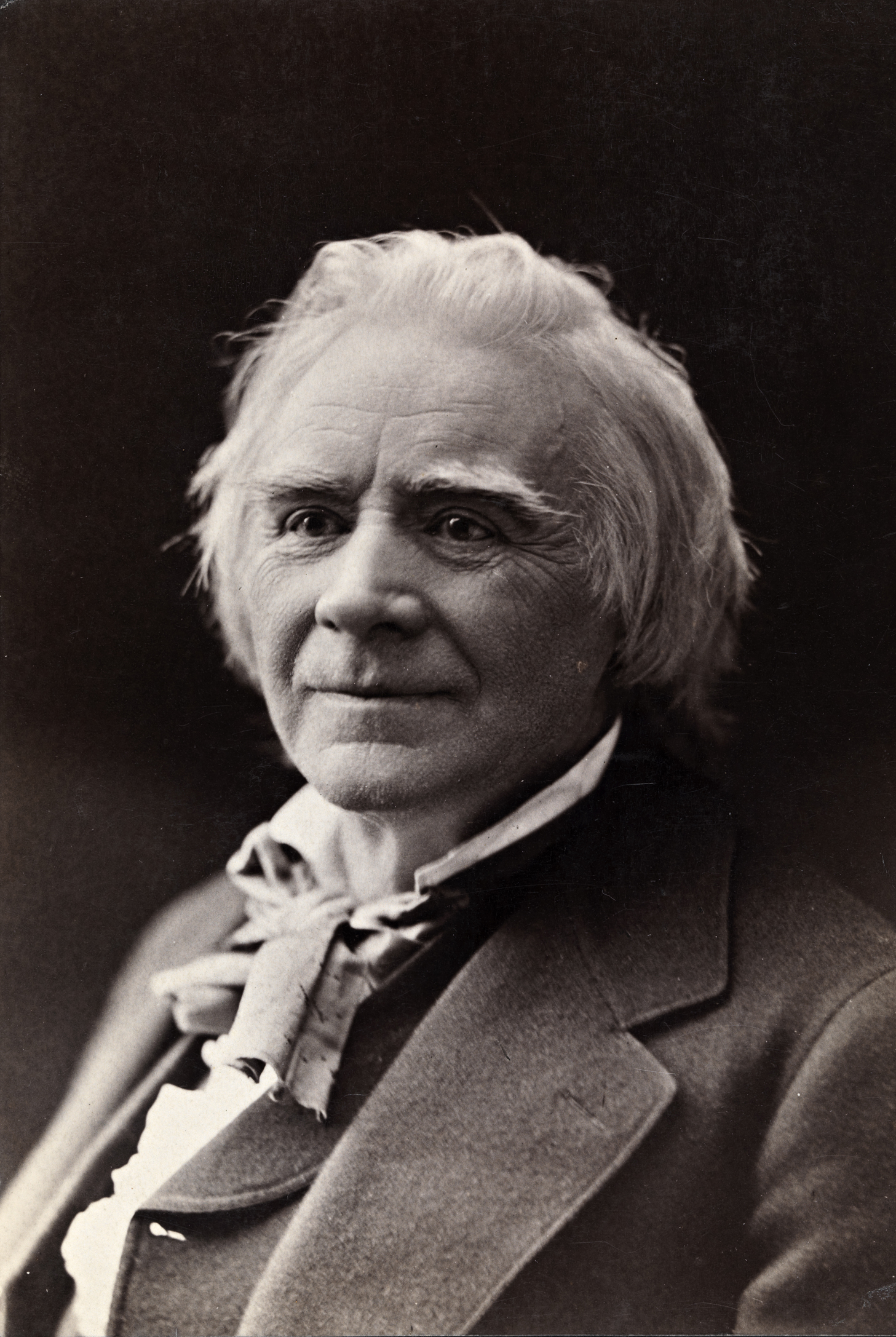
Bull

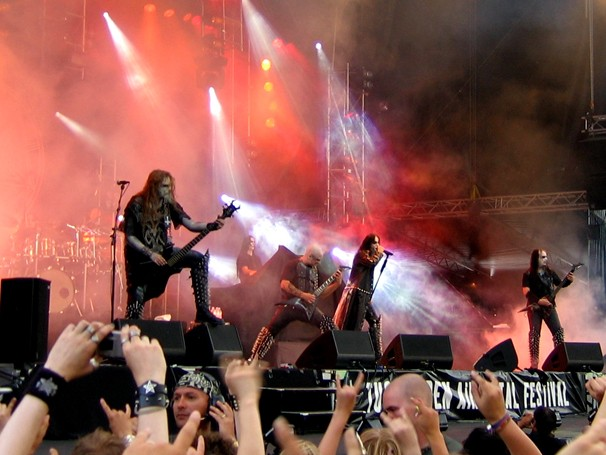
Dimmu Borgir

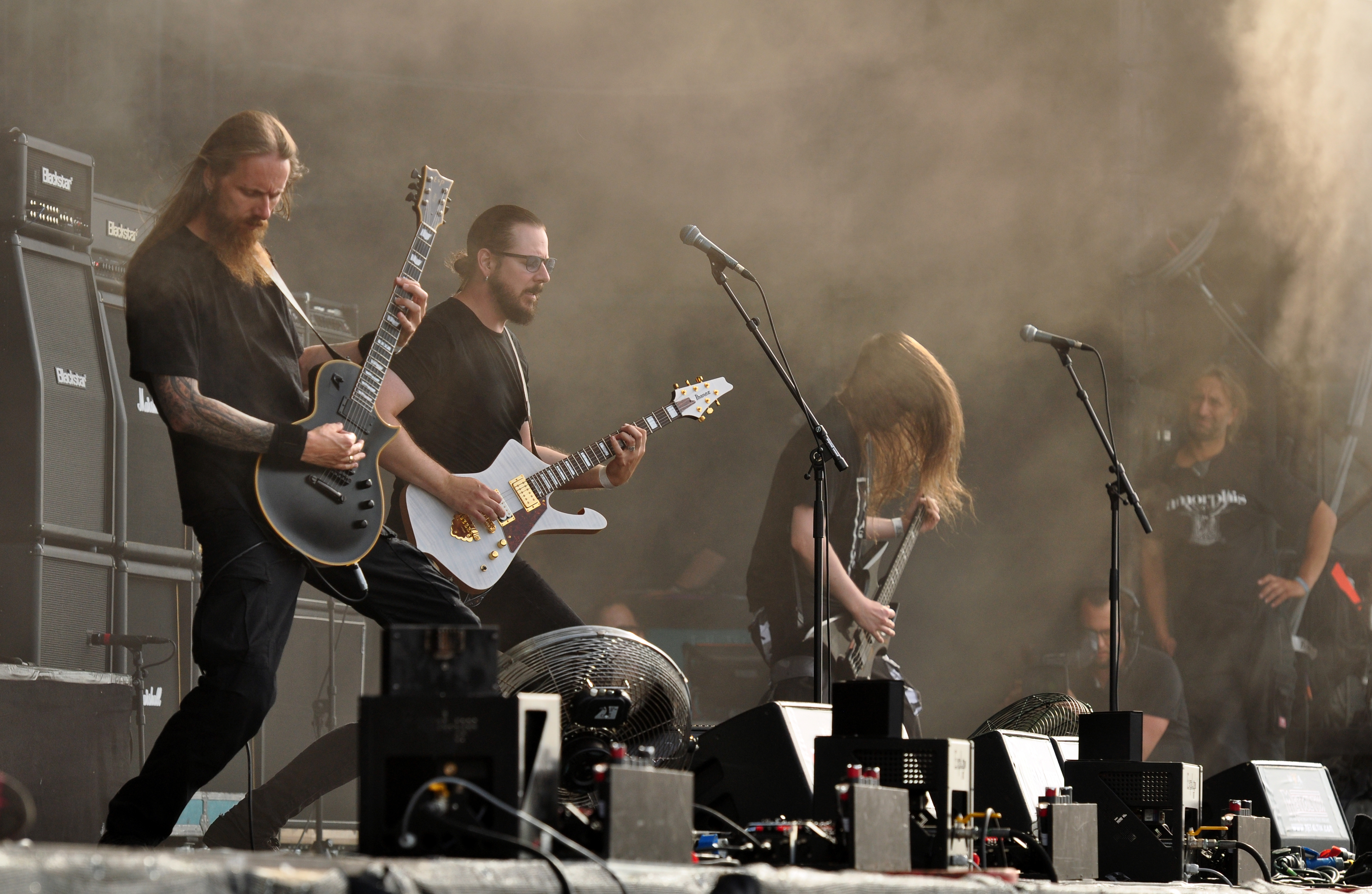
Emperor

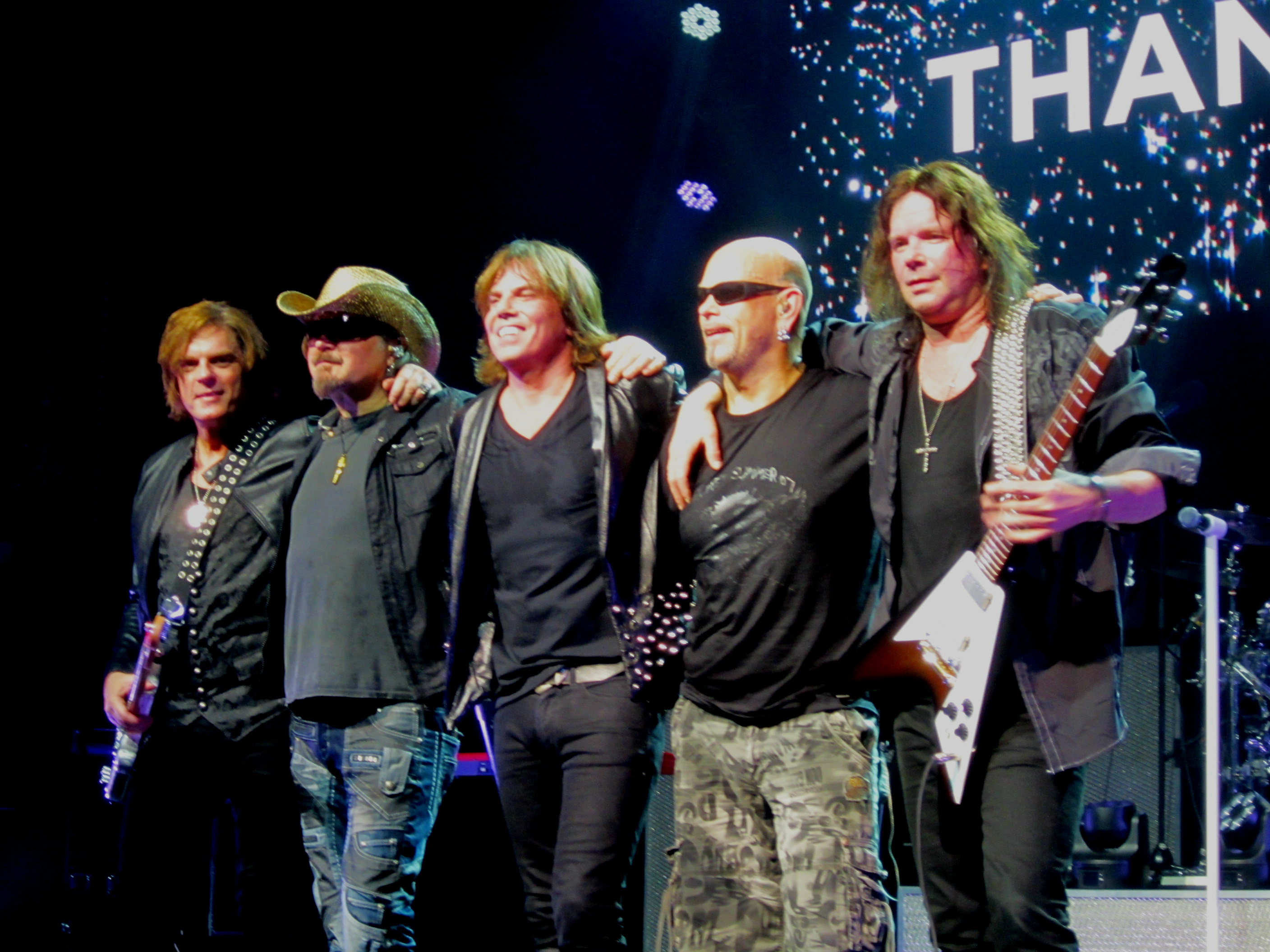
Europe

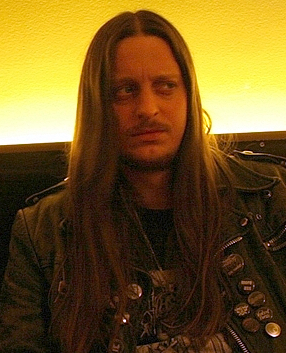
Fenriz

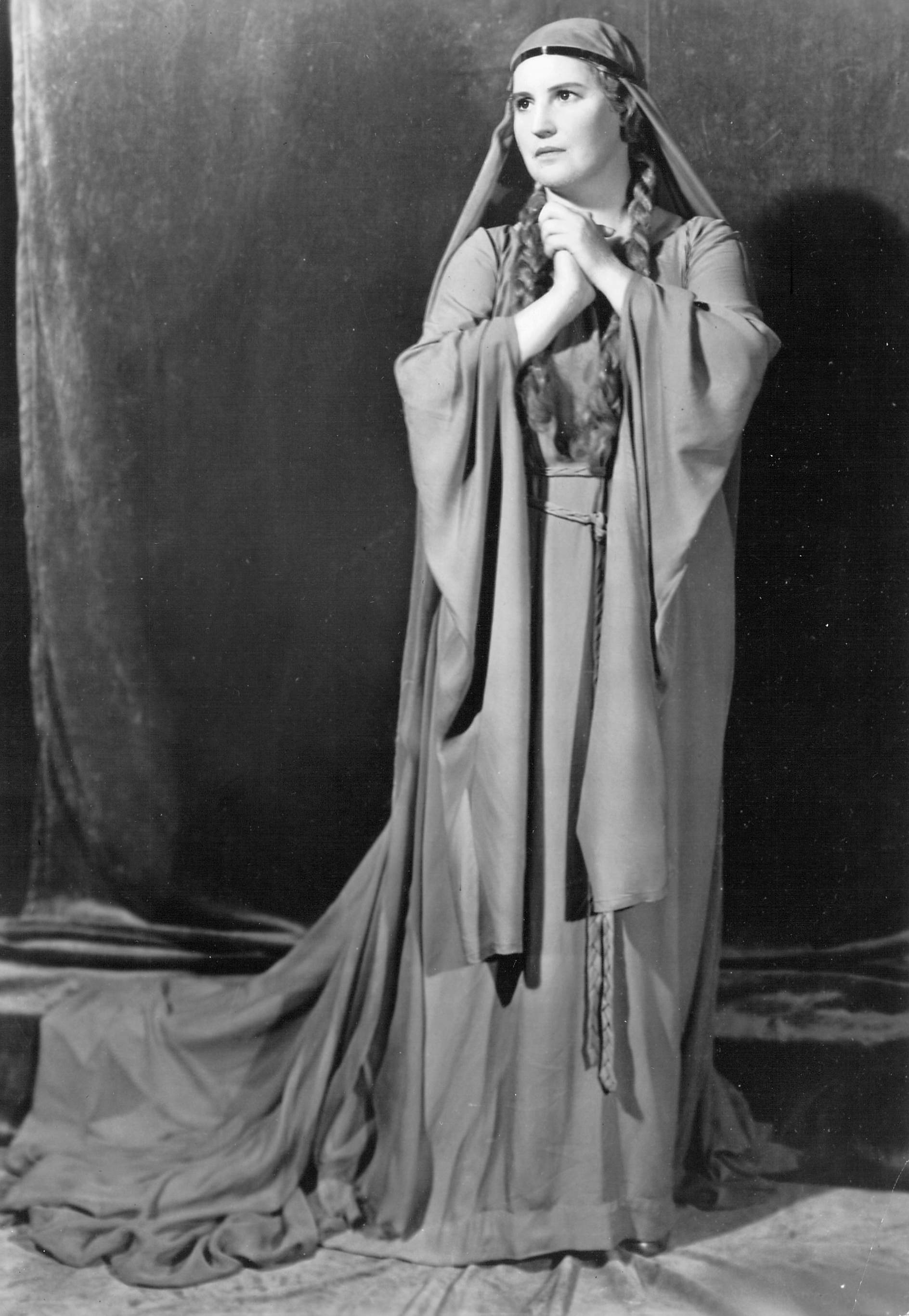
Flagstad

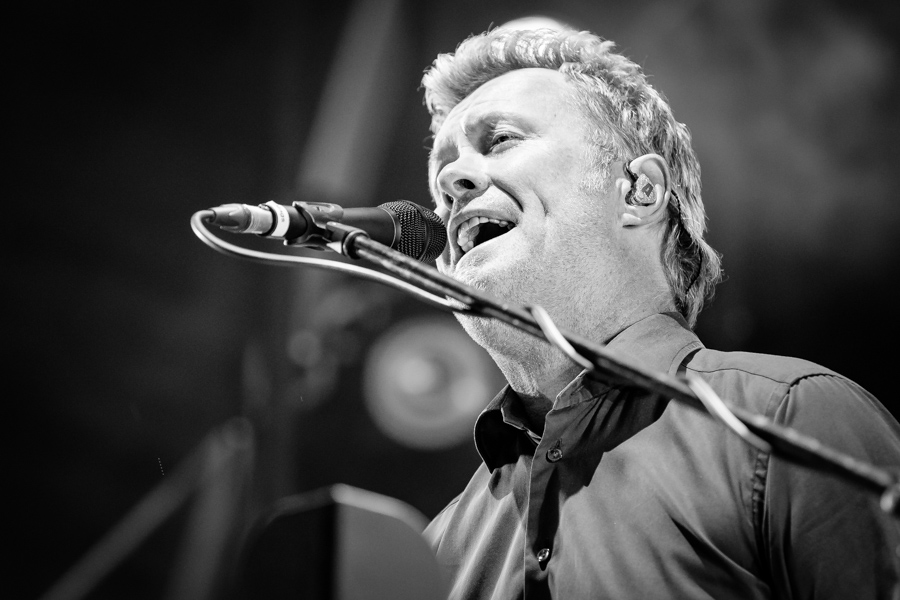
Furuholmen

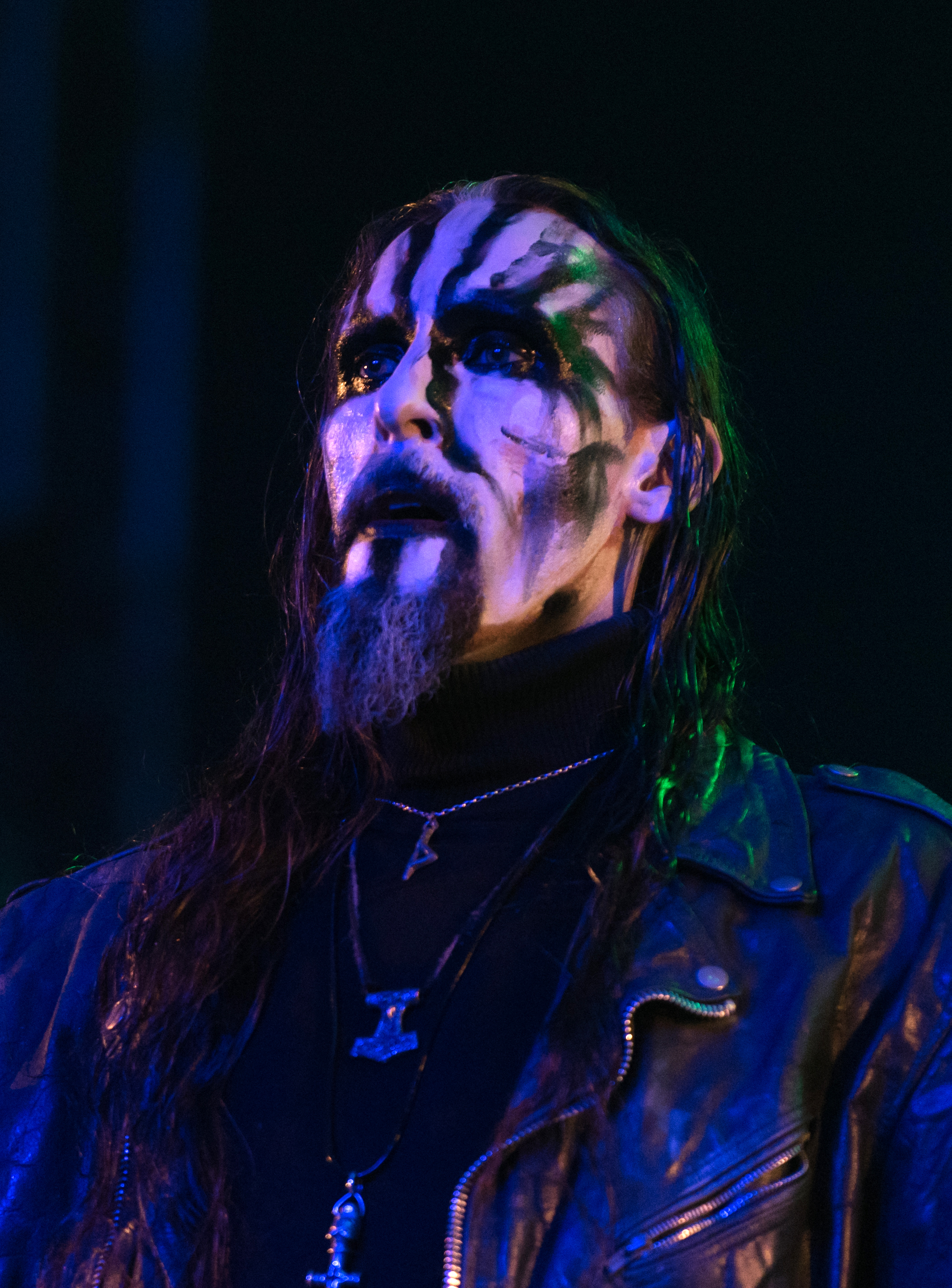
Gaahl

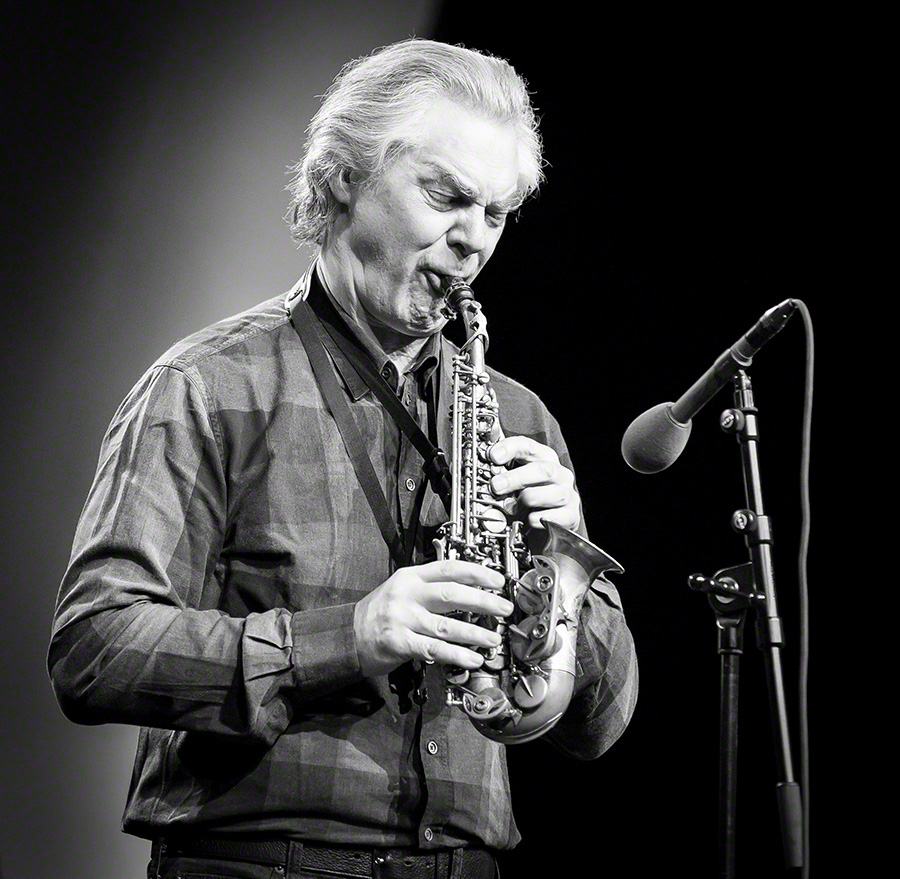
Garbarek

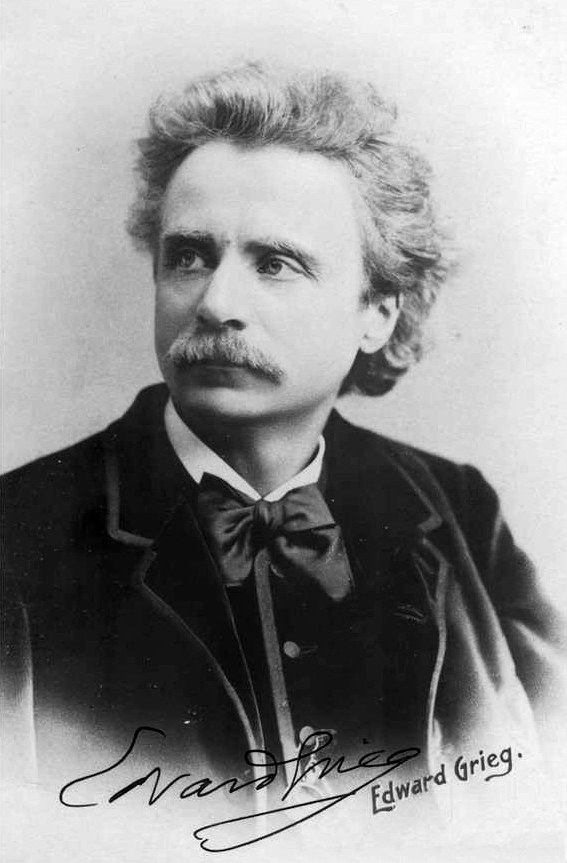
Grieg

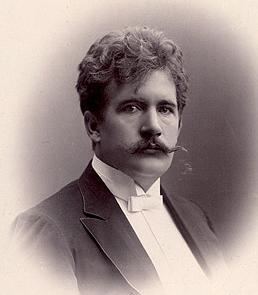
Halvorsen

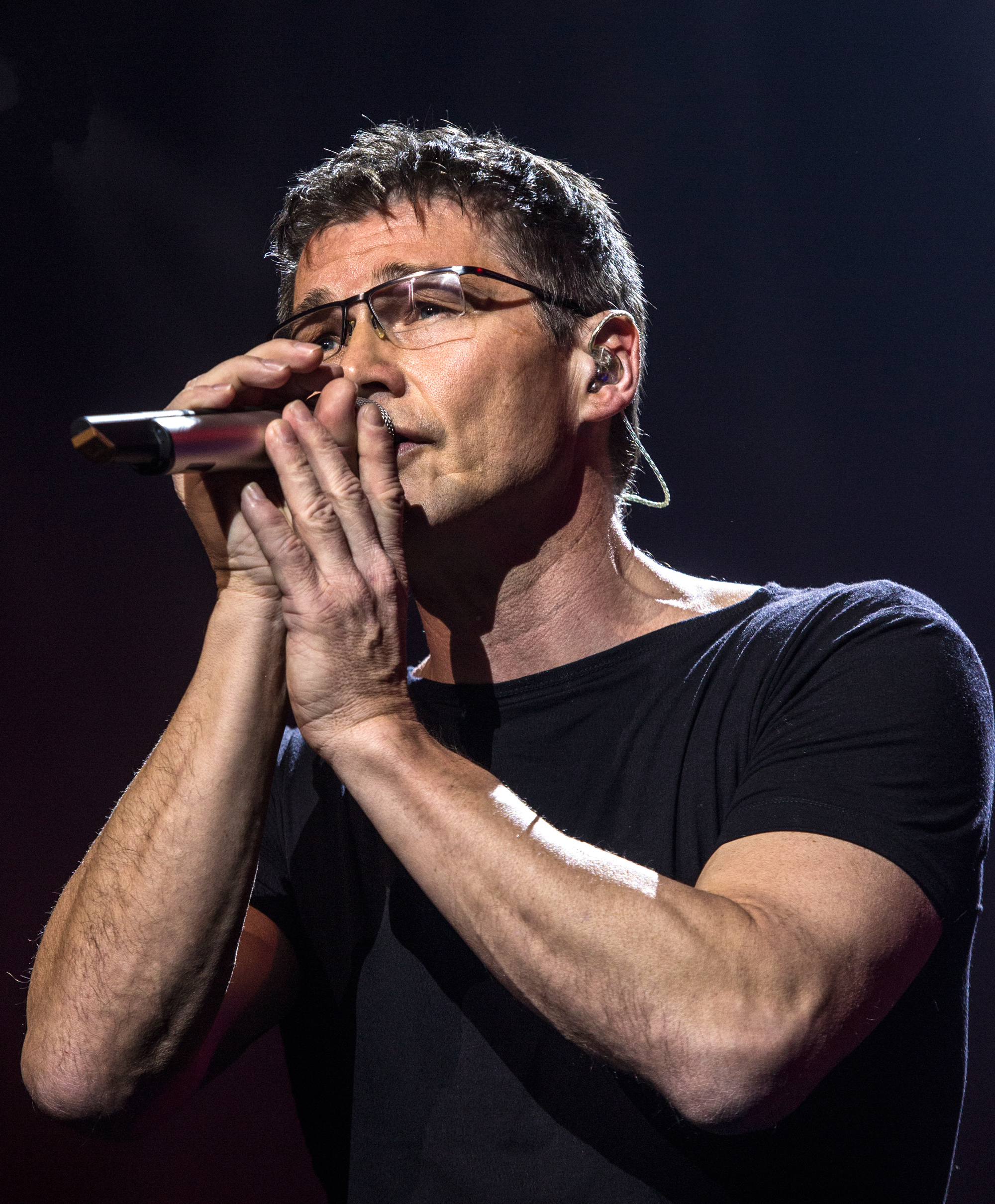
Harket

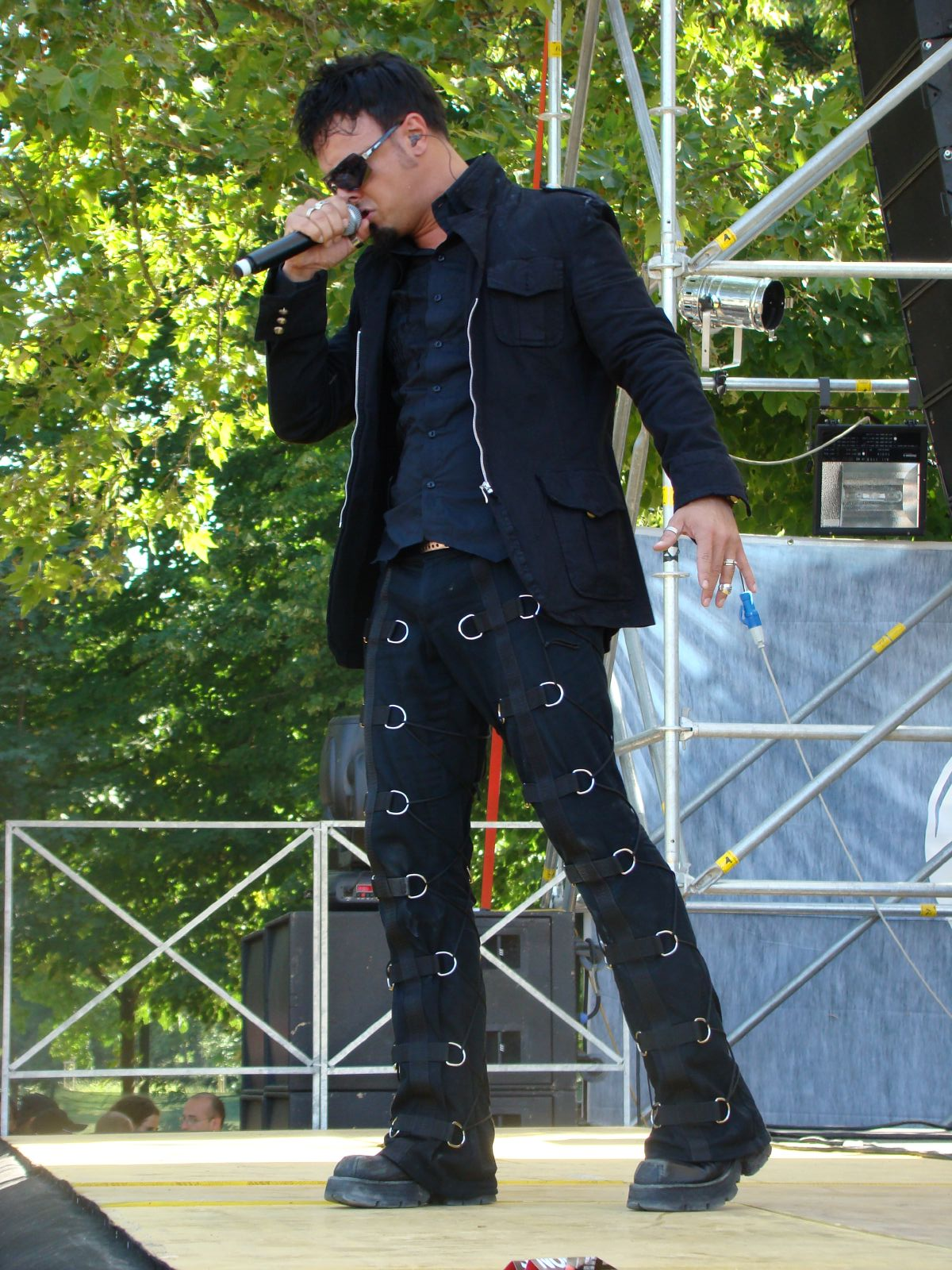
Roy Khan

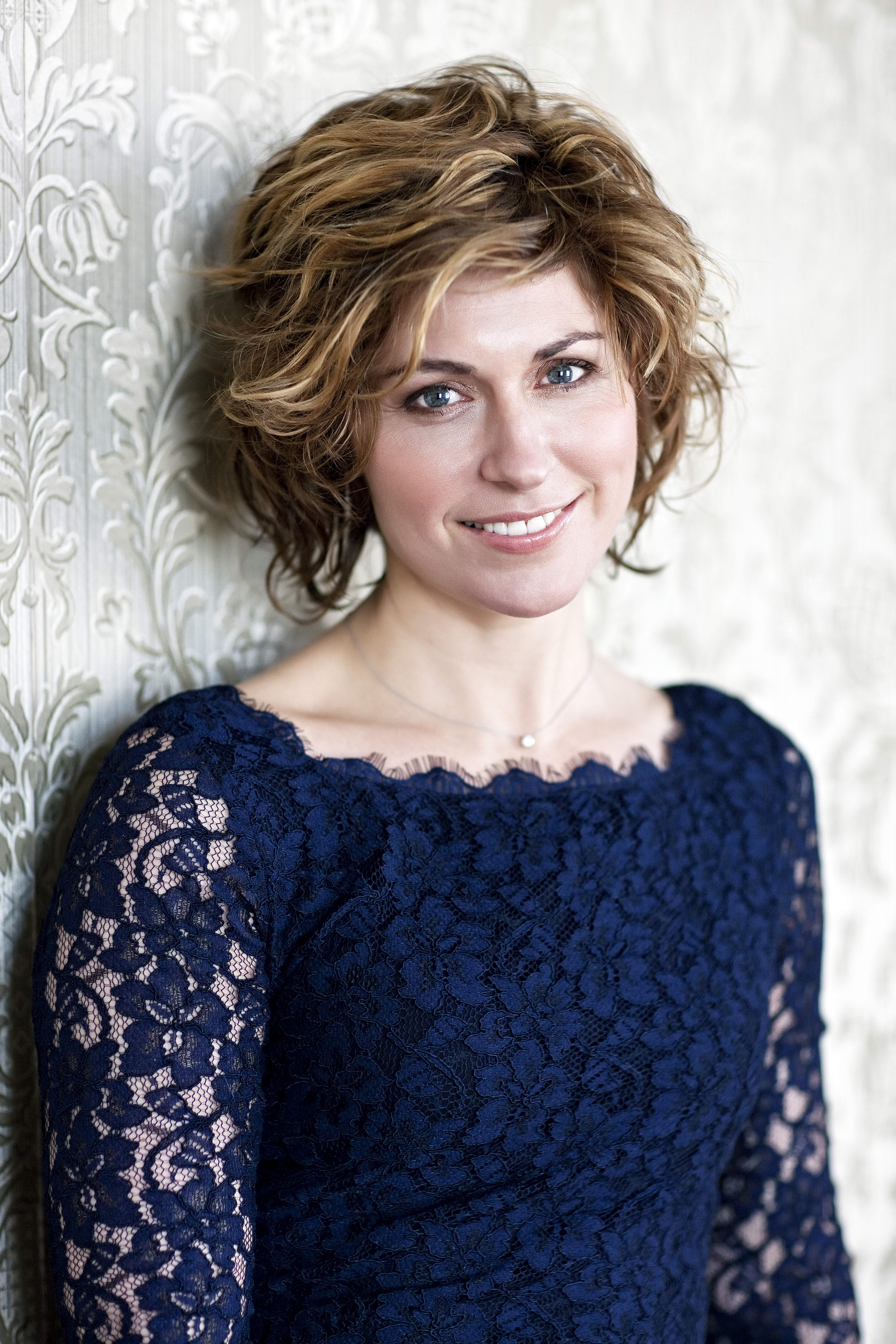
Kyrkjebø

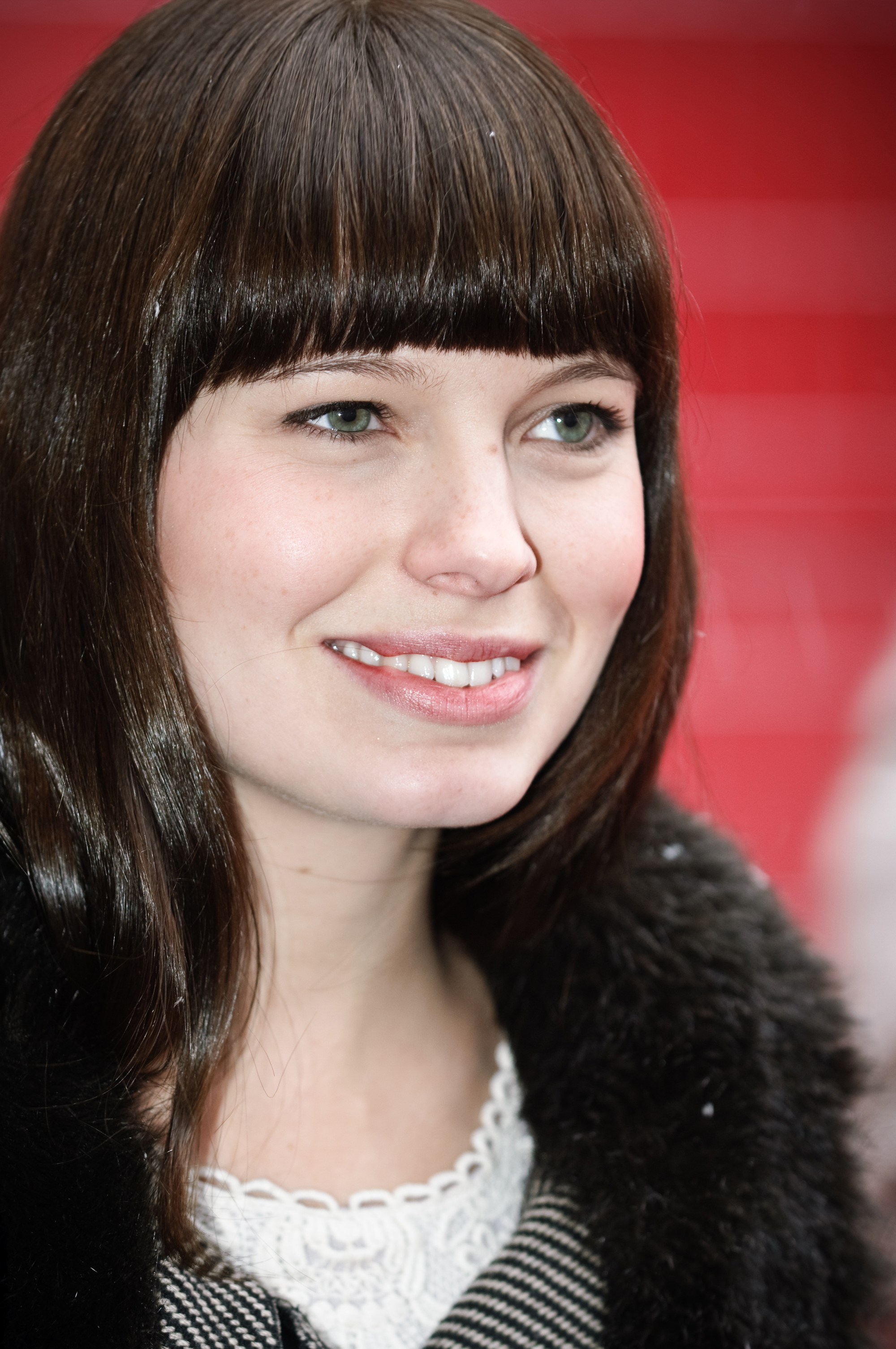
Larsen

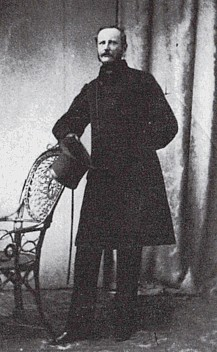
Løvenskiold

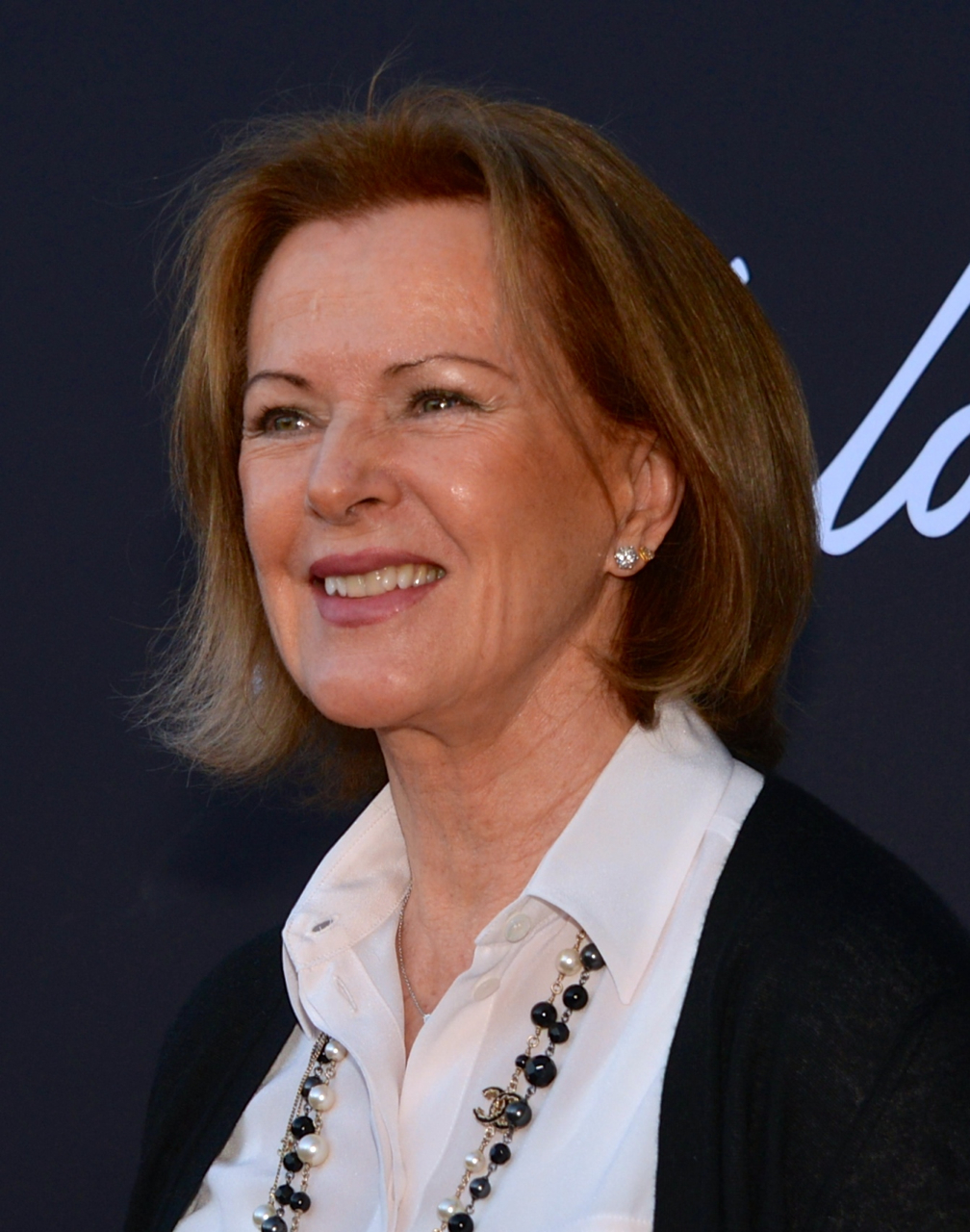
Lyngstad

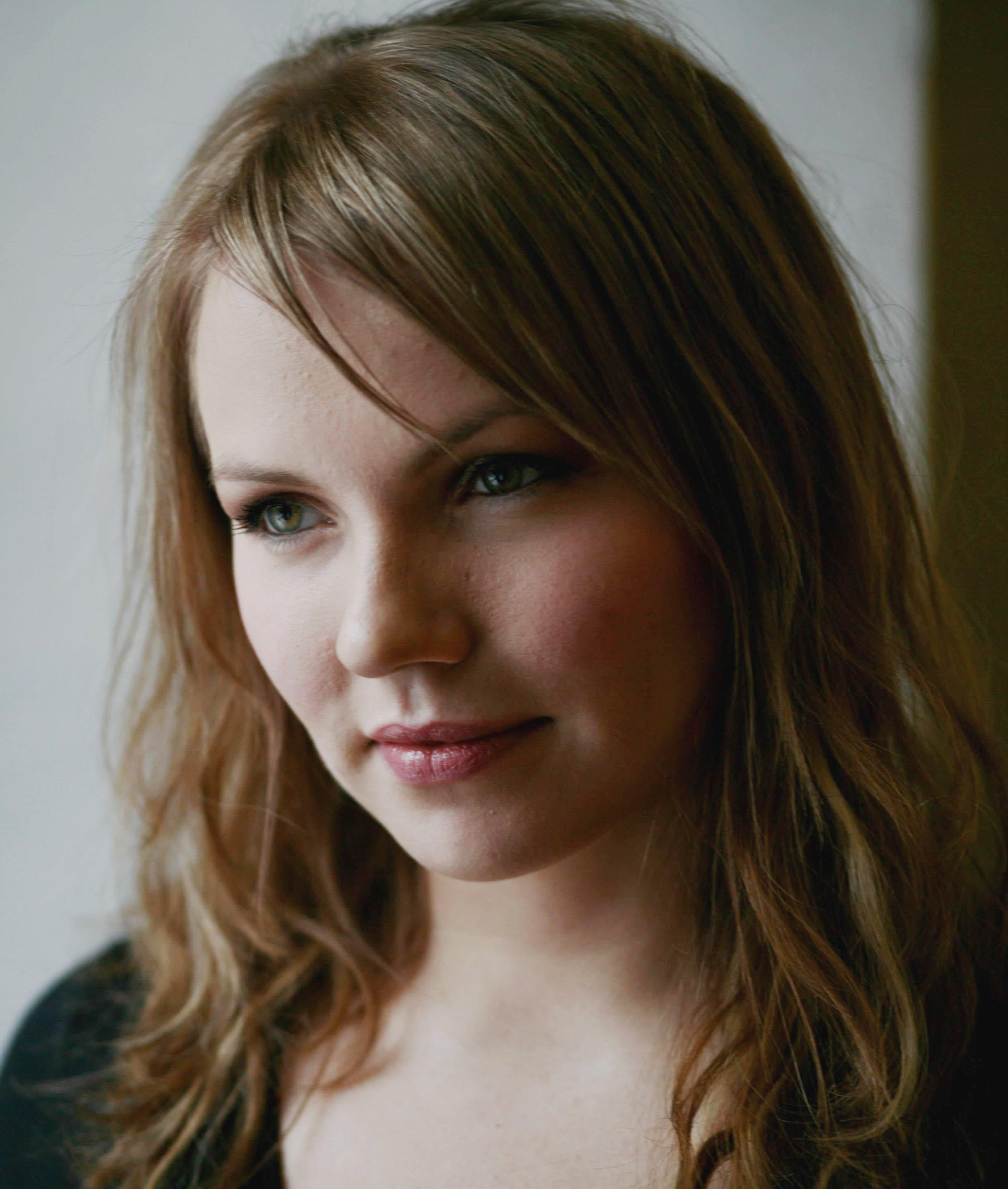
Marlin

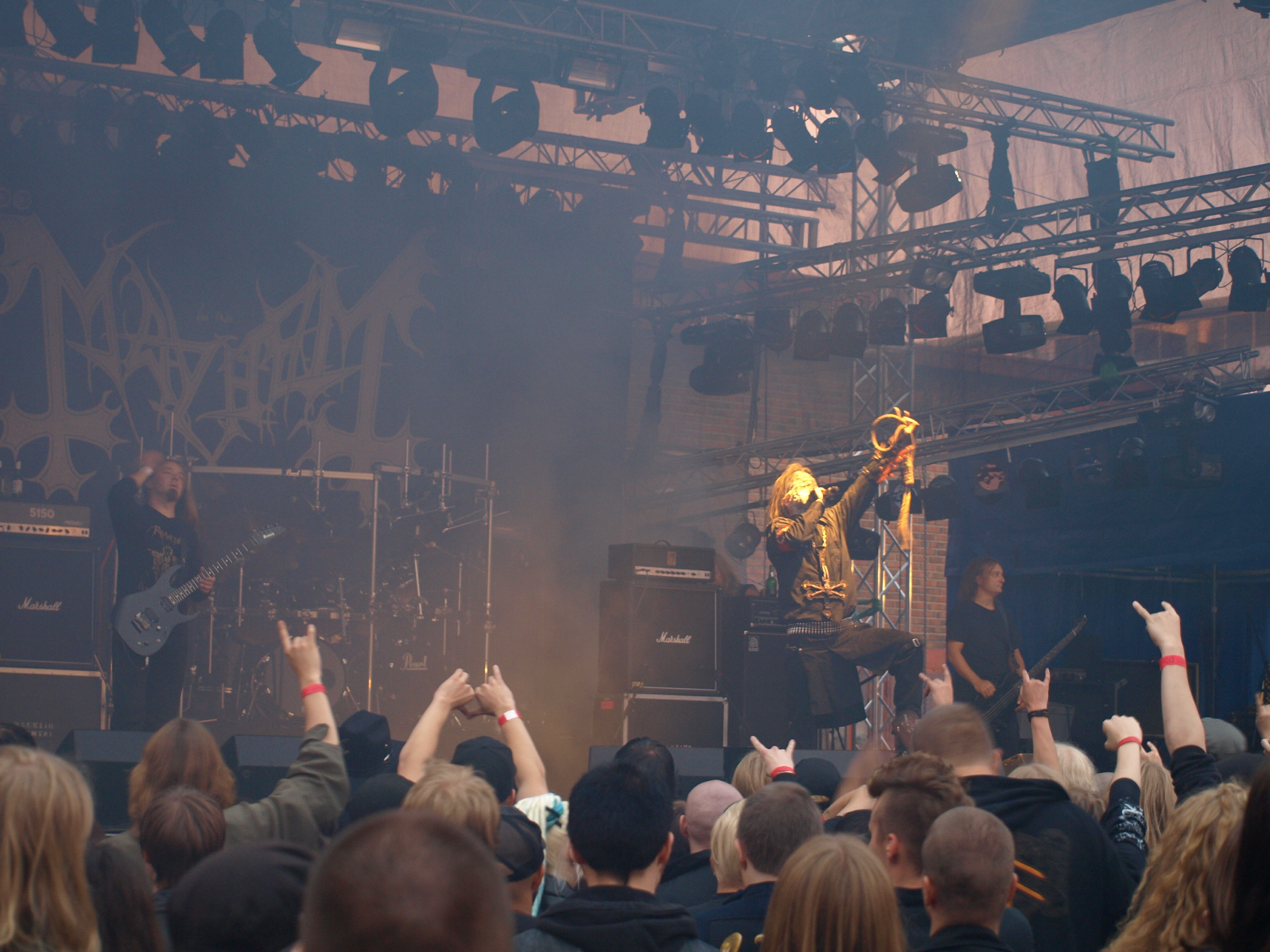
Mayhem

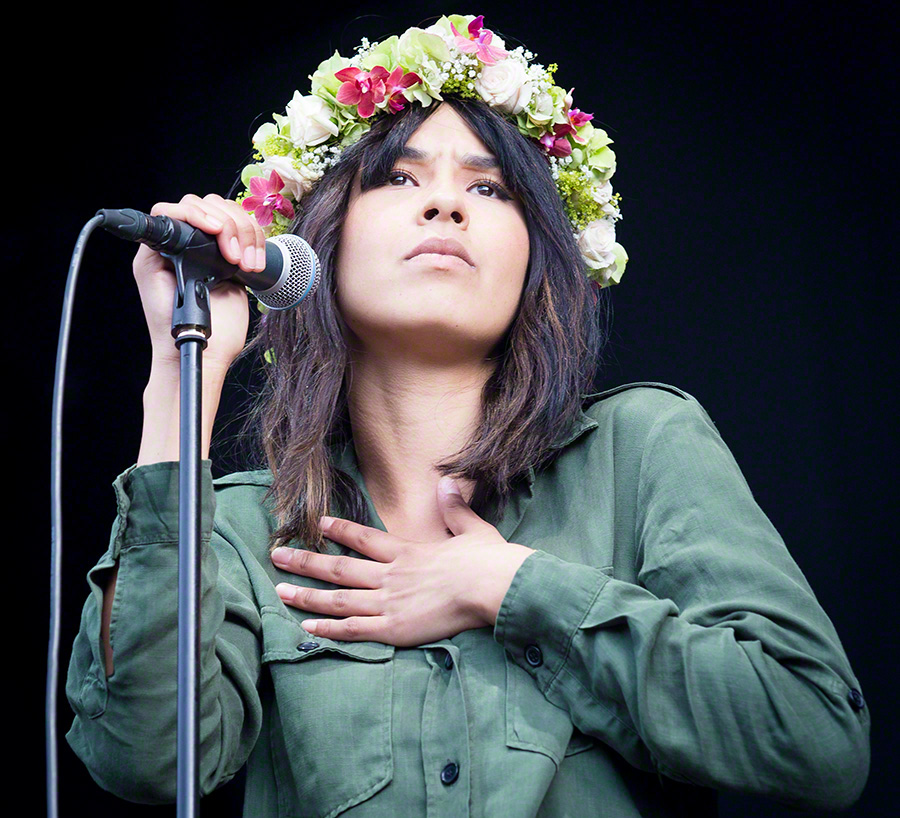
Mena

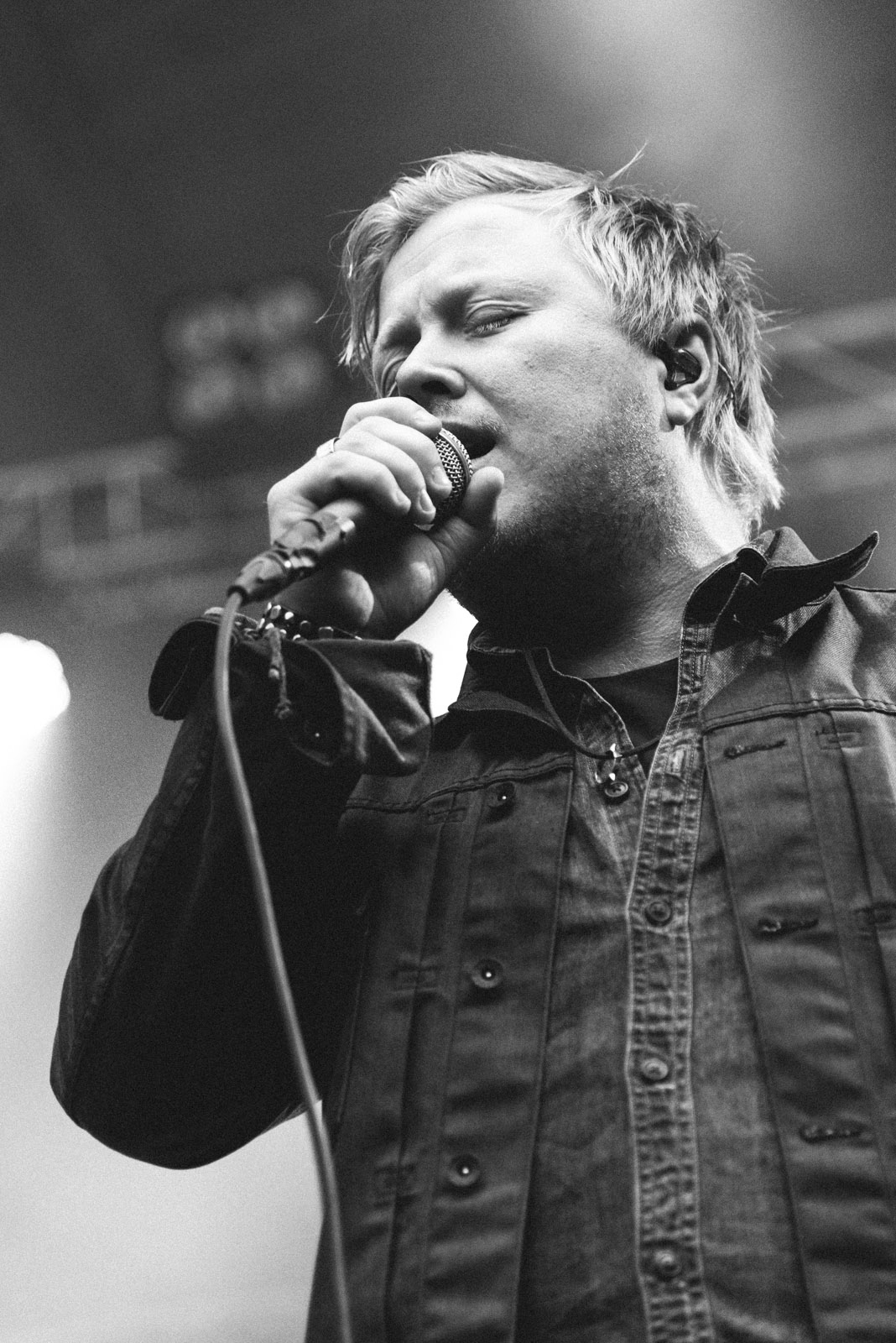
Nilsen

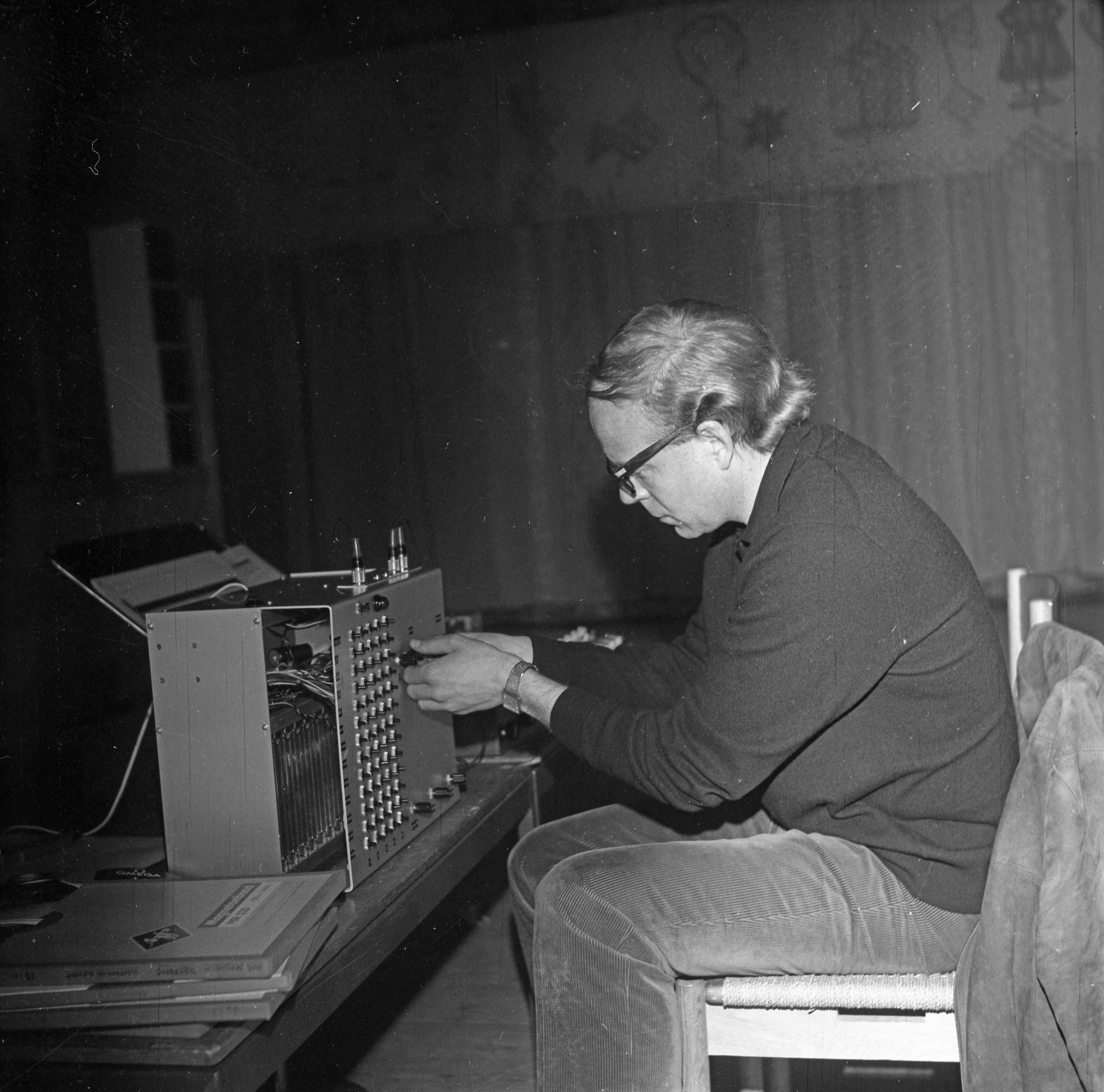
Nordheim

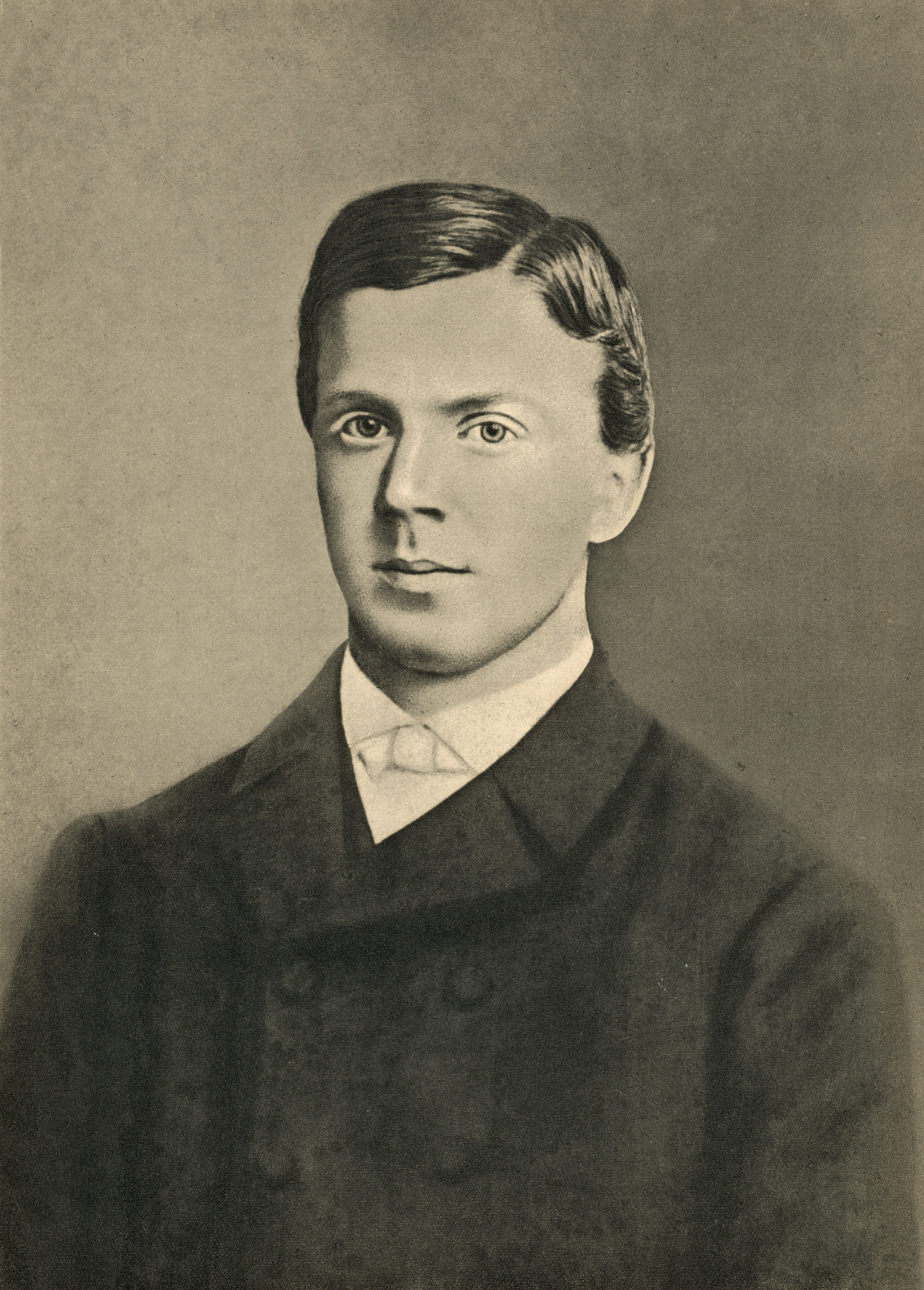
Nordraak

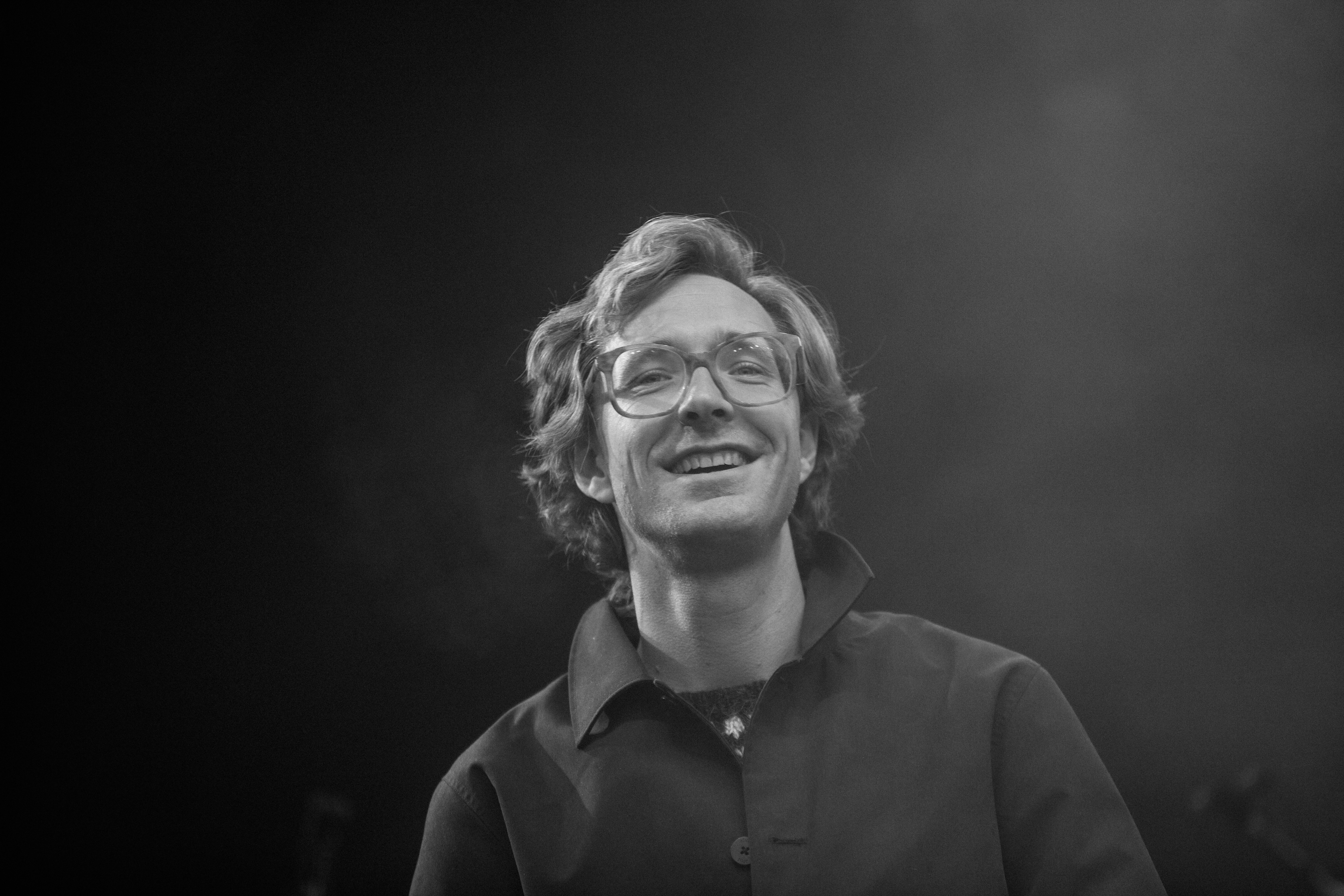
Øye

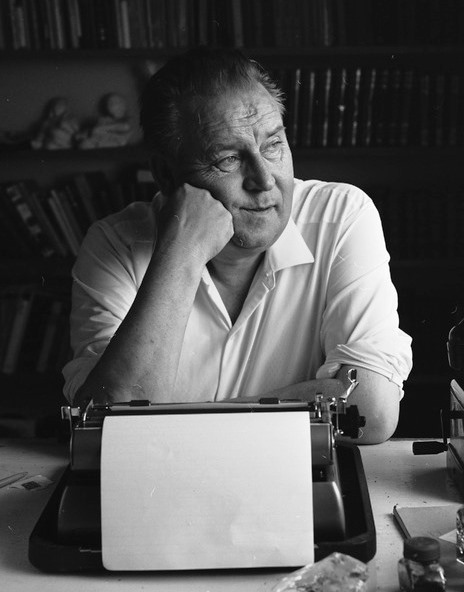
Prøysen

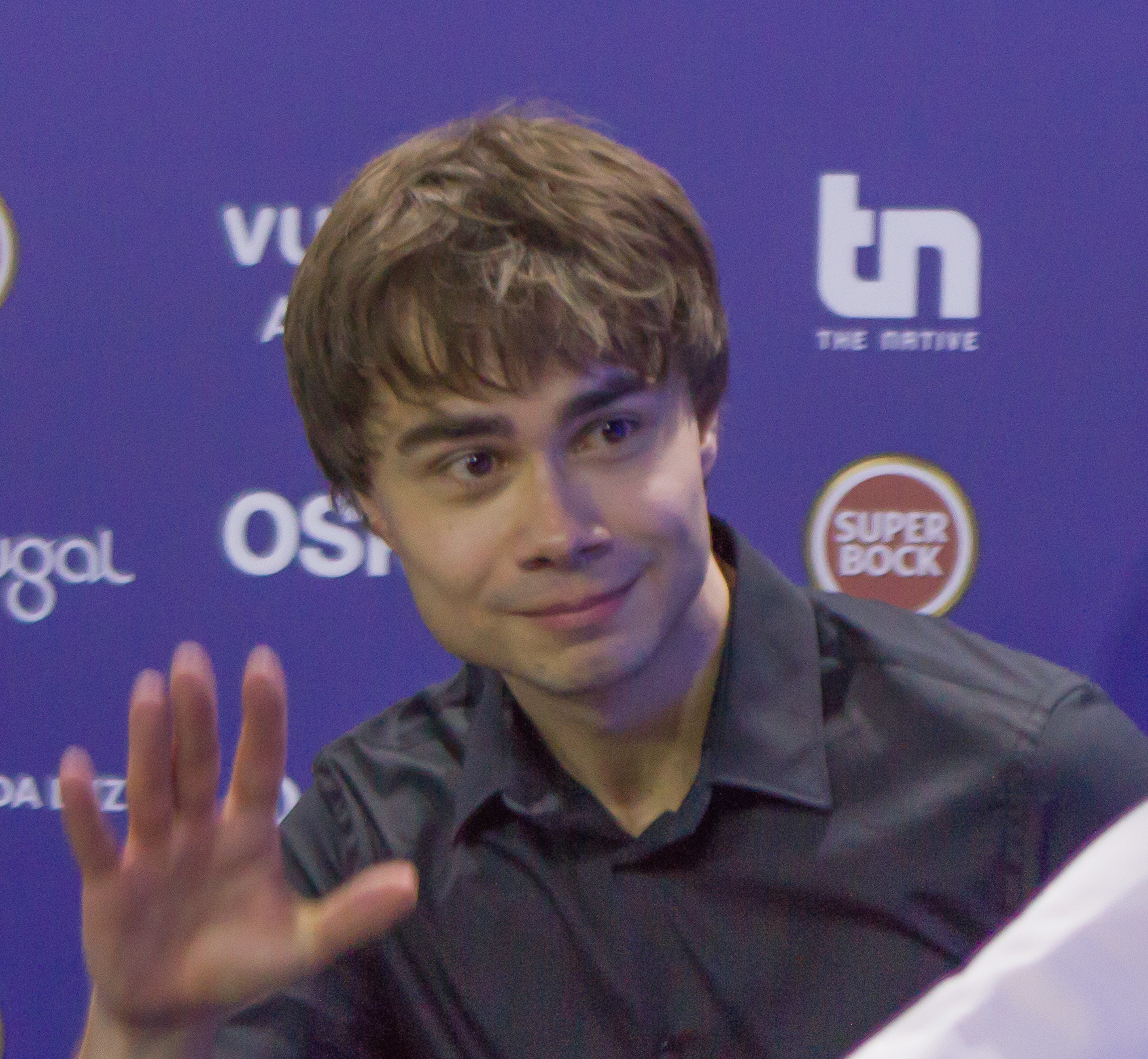
Rybak

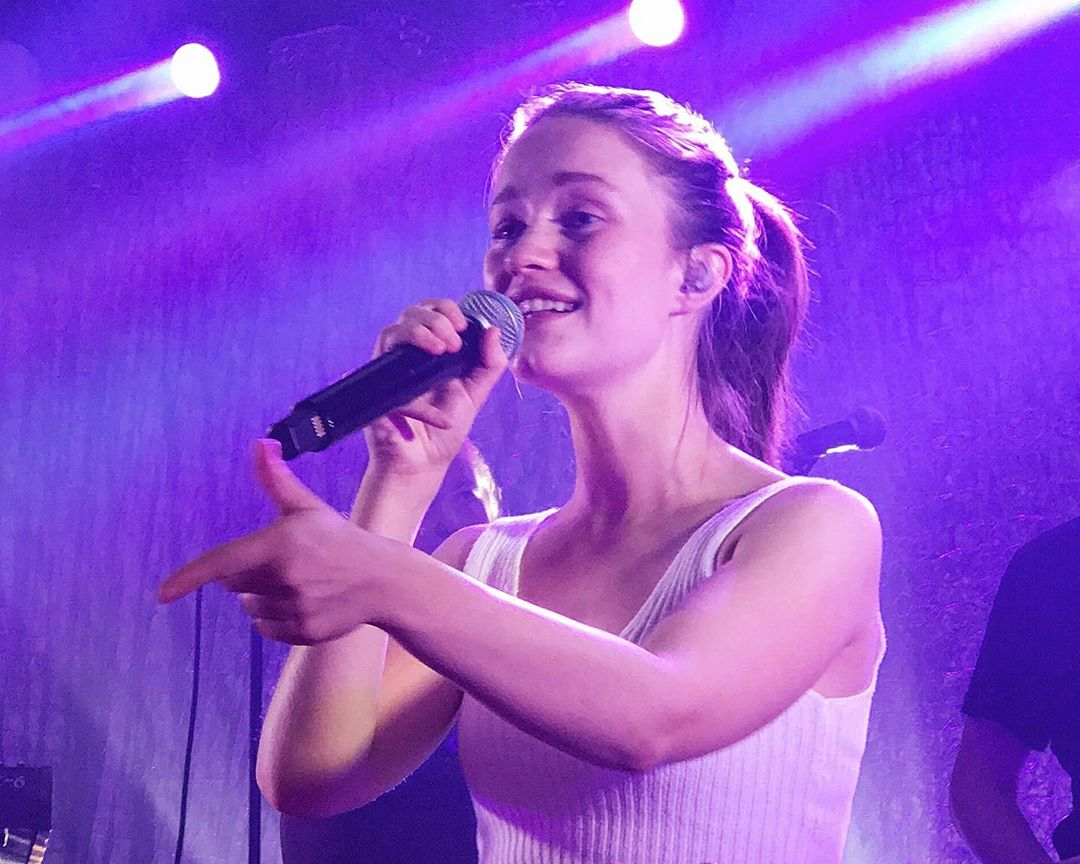
Sigrid

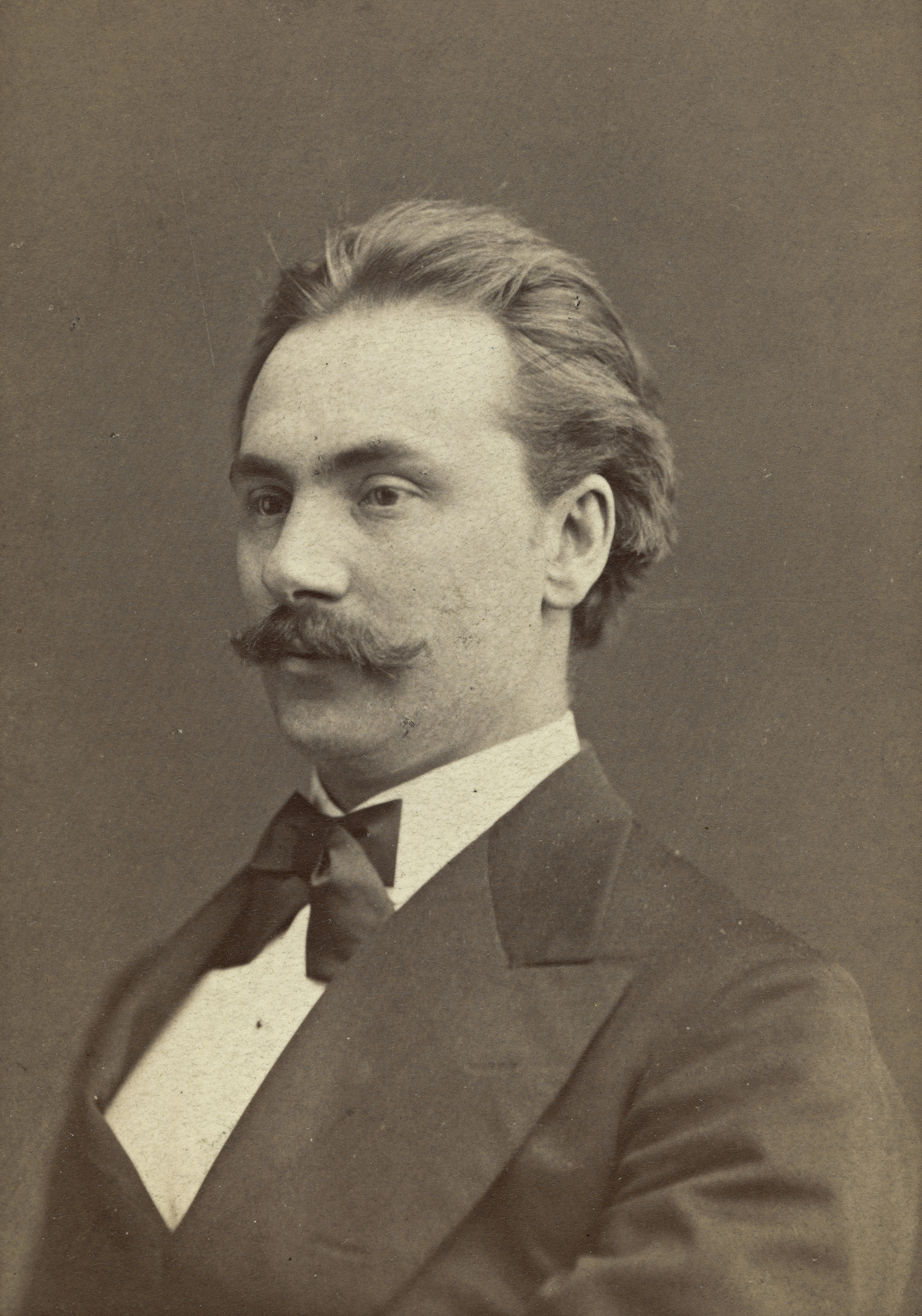
Svendsen

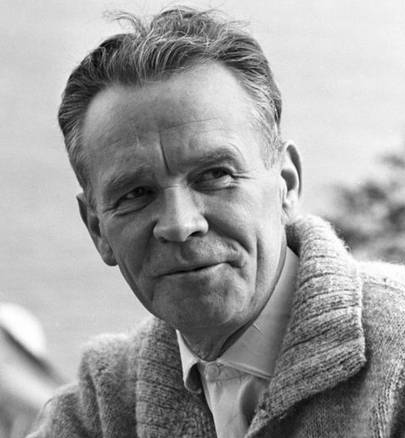
Tveitt

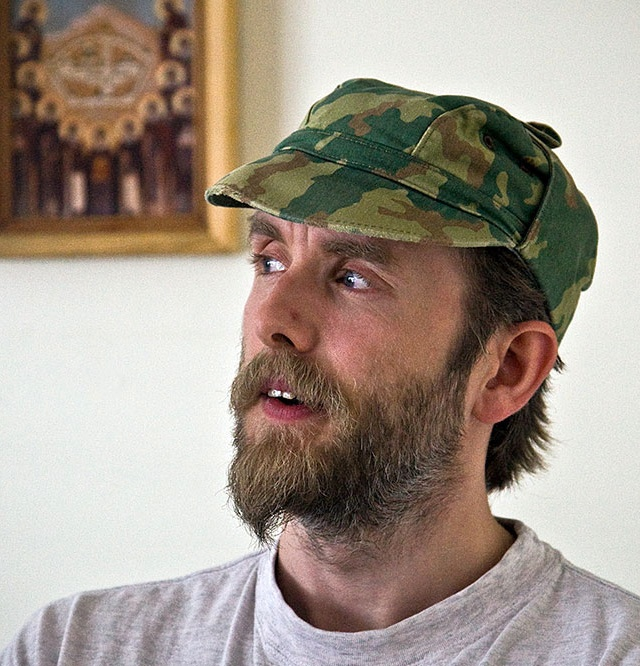
Vikernes

See also:

- Music of Norway

=== Painting and sculpture ===
- Nils Aas, sculptor
- Betzy Akersloot-Berg, painter
- Peter Nicolai Arbo, painter
- Nikolai Astrup, painter
- Harriet Backer, painter
- Peder Balke, painter
- Brynjulf Bergslien, sculptor
- Andreas Bloch, painter
- Tupsy Clement, painter
- Hans Dahl, painter
- J.C. Dahl, painter
- Brit Dyrnes, ceramist
- Bjorn Egeli, painter
- Yngvild Fagerheim, ceramist
- Thomas Fearnley, painter
- Johannes Flintoe, painter
- Magne Furuholmen, painter, sculptor
- Åse Frøyshov, textile artist
- Rolf Groven, painter
- Hans Gude, painter
- Aasta Hansteen, painter
- Lars Hertervig, painter
- Thorolf Holmboe, painter
- Olaf Isaachsen, painter
- Theodor Kittelsen, painter
- Annelise Knudtzon, textile artist
- Christian Krohg, painter
- Oda Krohg, painter
- Edvard Munch, painter
- Odd Nerdrum, painter
- Wilhelm Peters, painter
- Eilif Peterssen, painter
- Børre Sæthre, artist
- Vebjørn Sand, painter
- Christiane Schreiber, painter
- Otto Sinding, painter
- Christian Skredsvig, painter
- Harald Sohlberg, painter
- Frits Thaulow, painter
- Adolph Tidemand, painter
- Gustav Vigeland, sculptor
- Erik Werenskiold, painter, illustrator

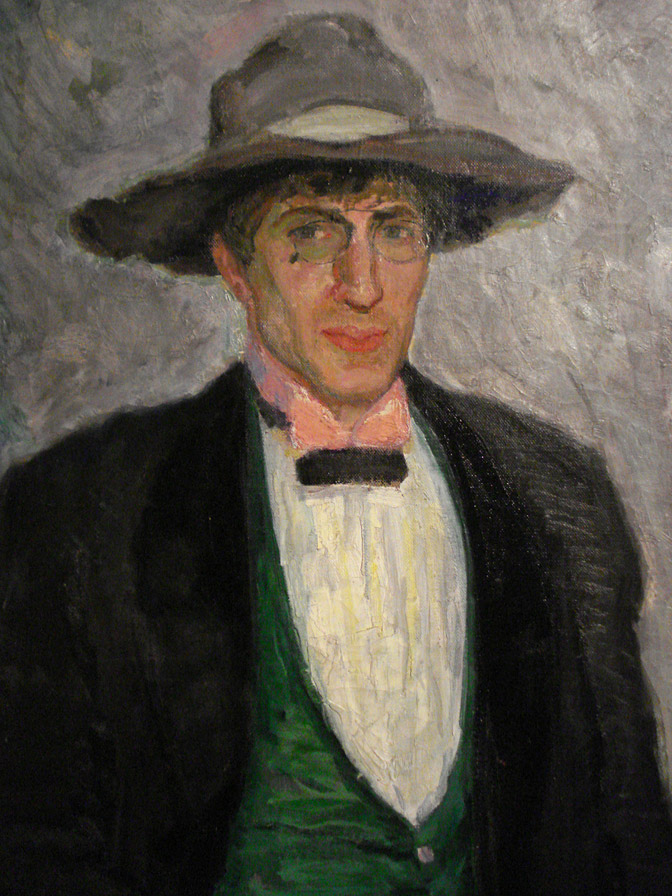
Astrup

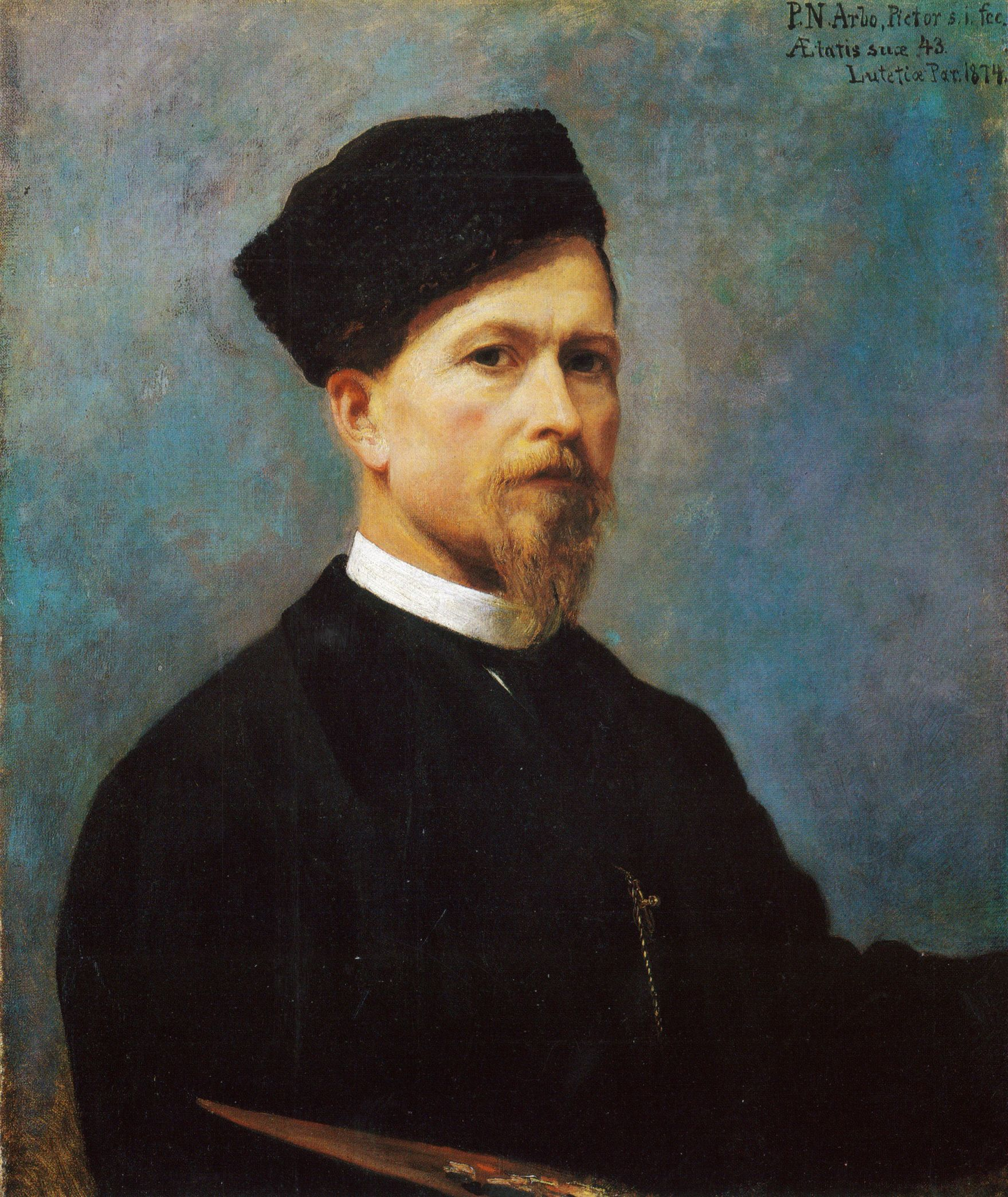
Arbo

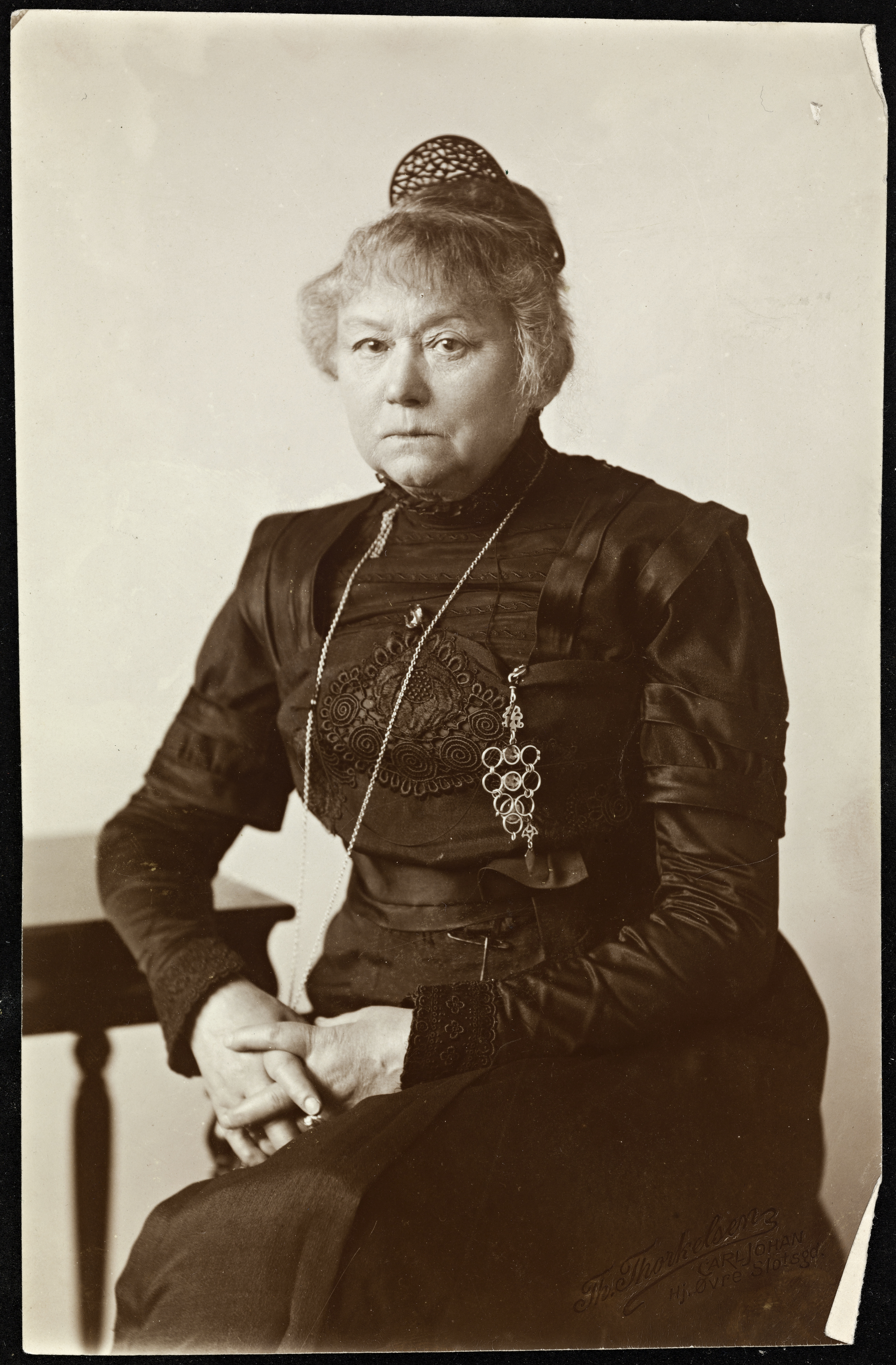
Backer

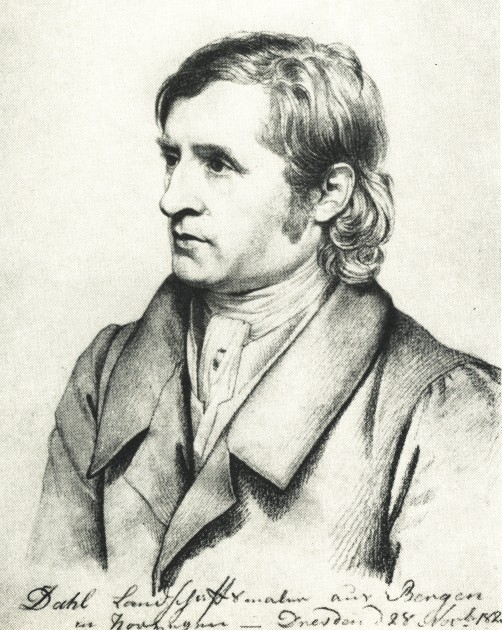
Dahl

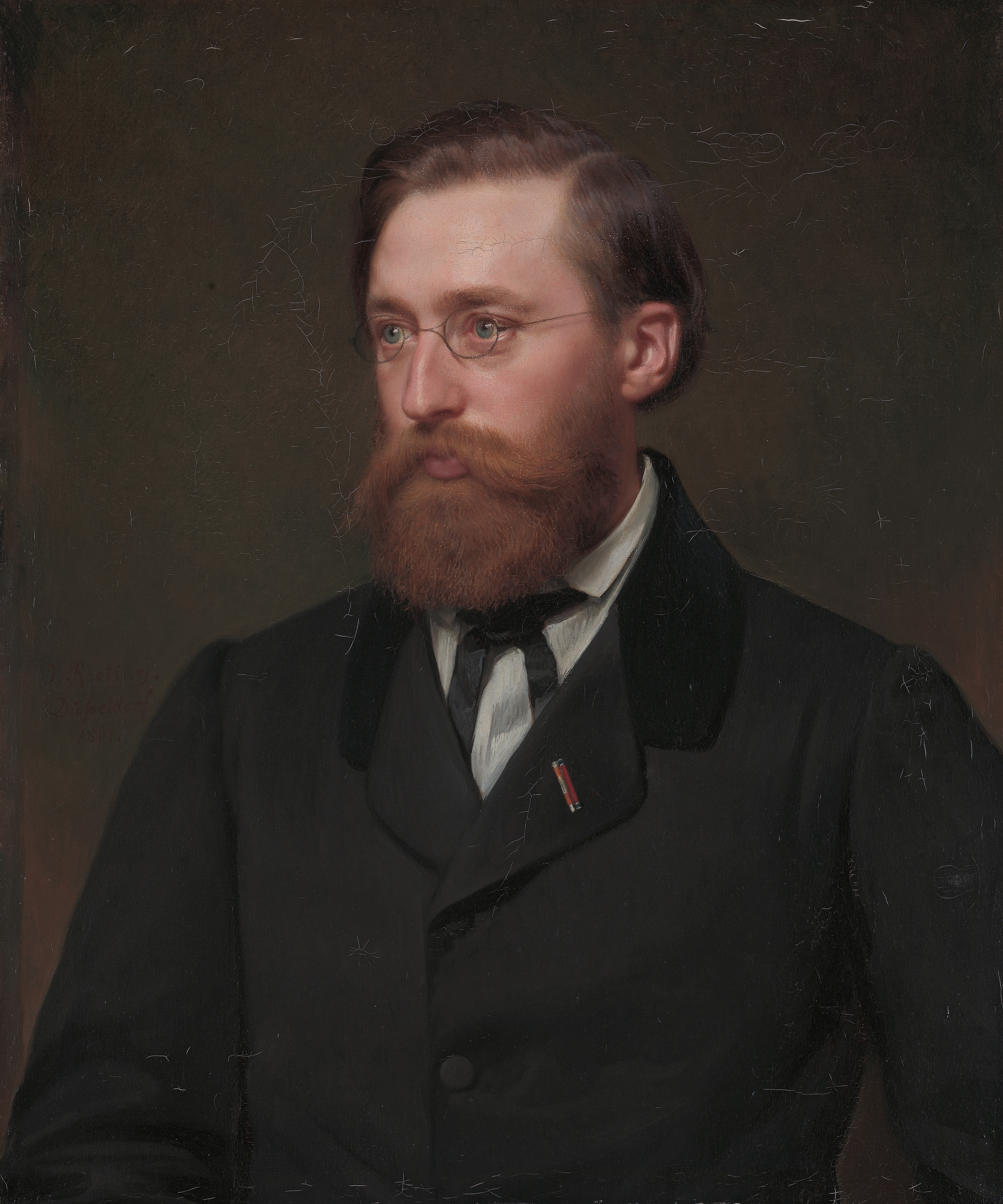
Gude

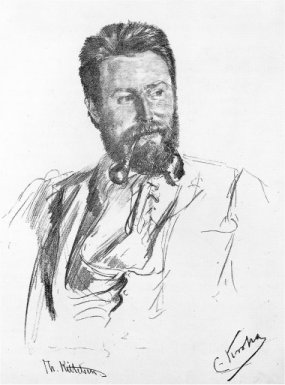
Kittelsen

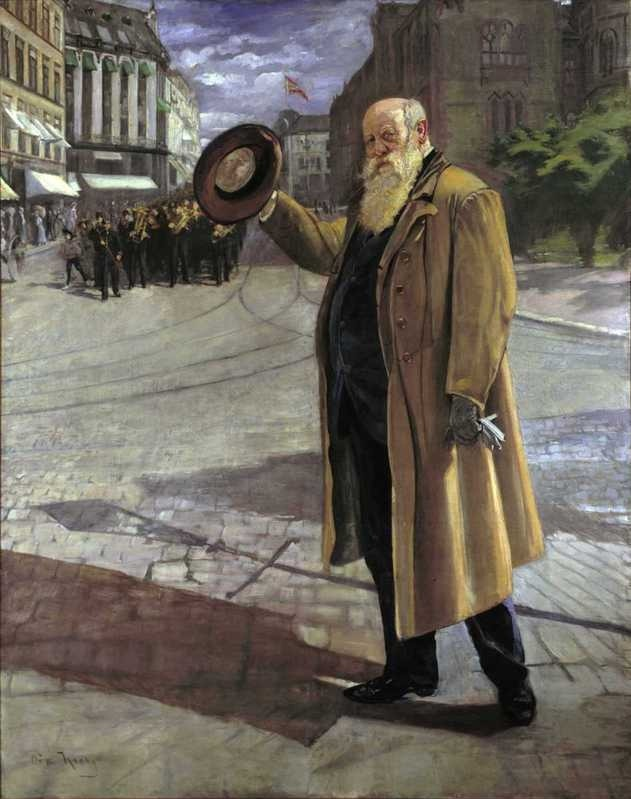
Krohg

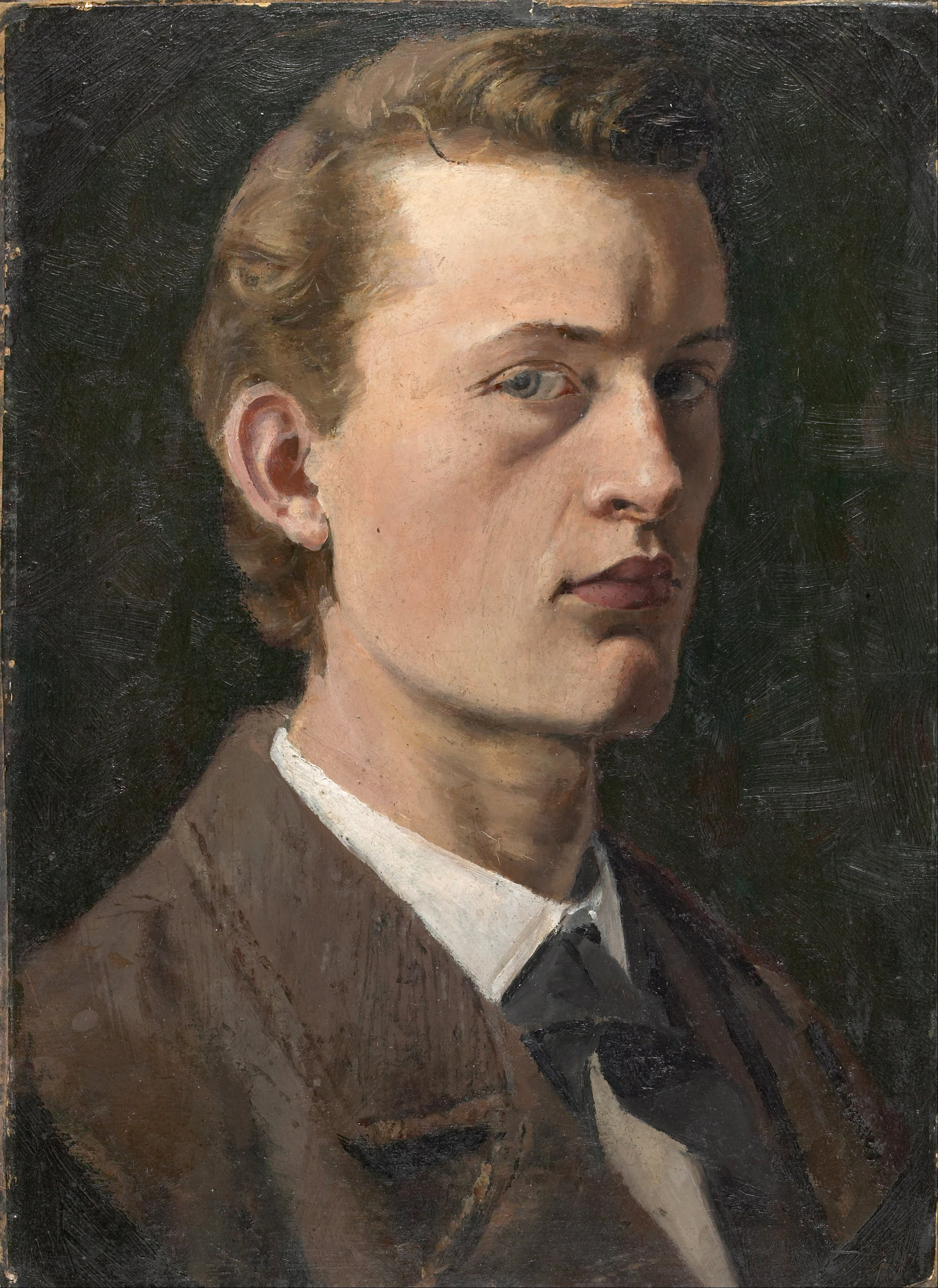
Munch

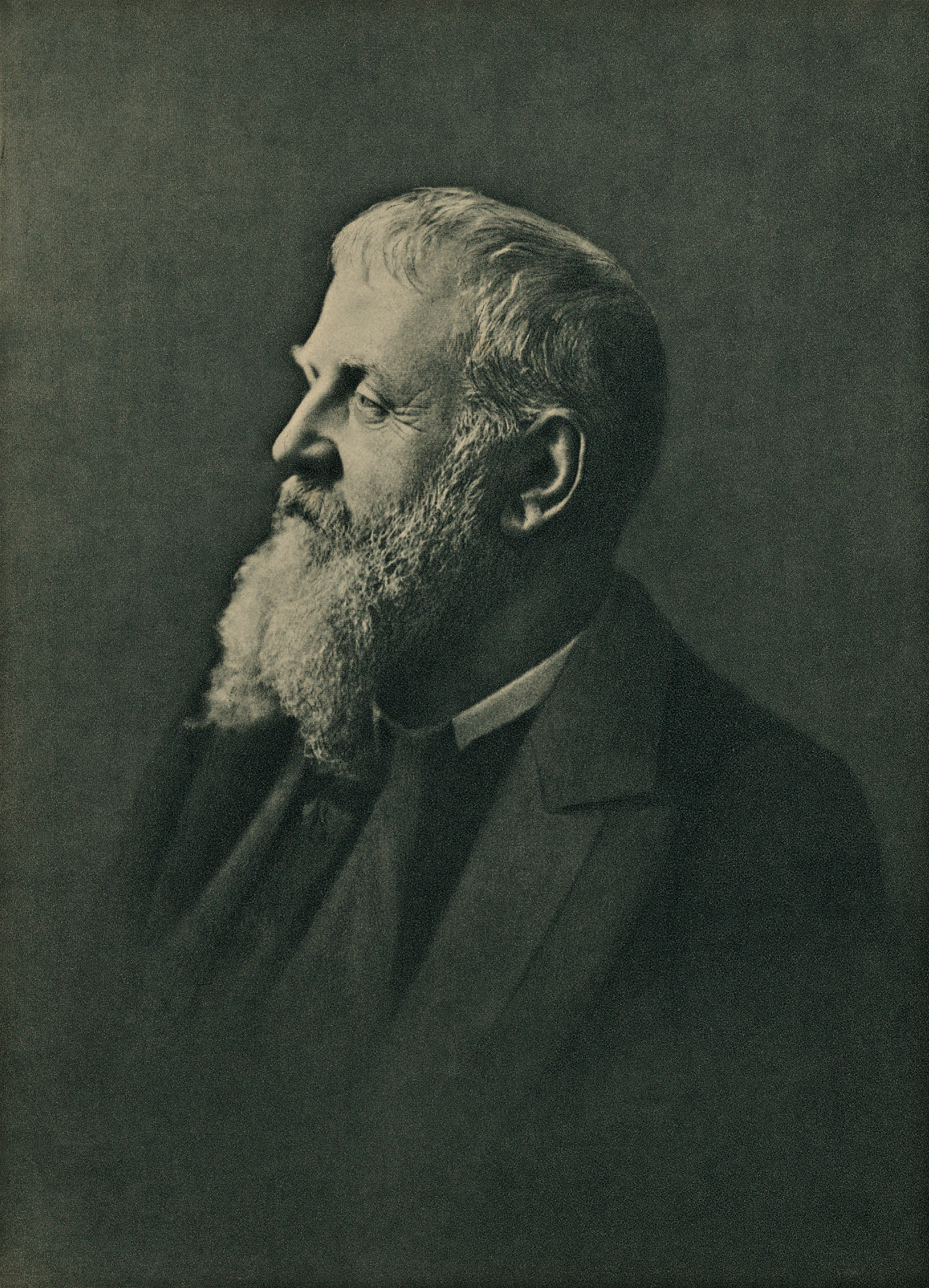
Thaulow

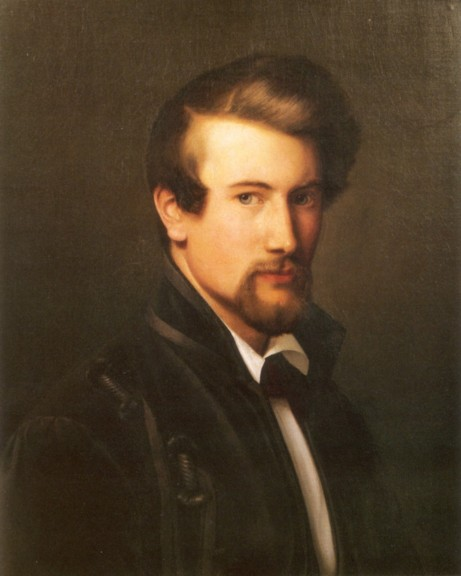
Tidemand

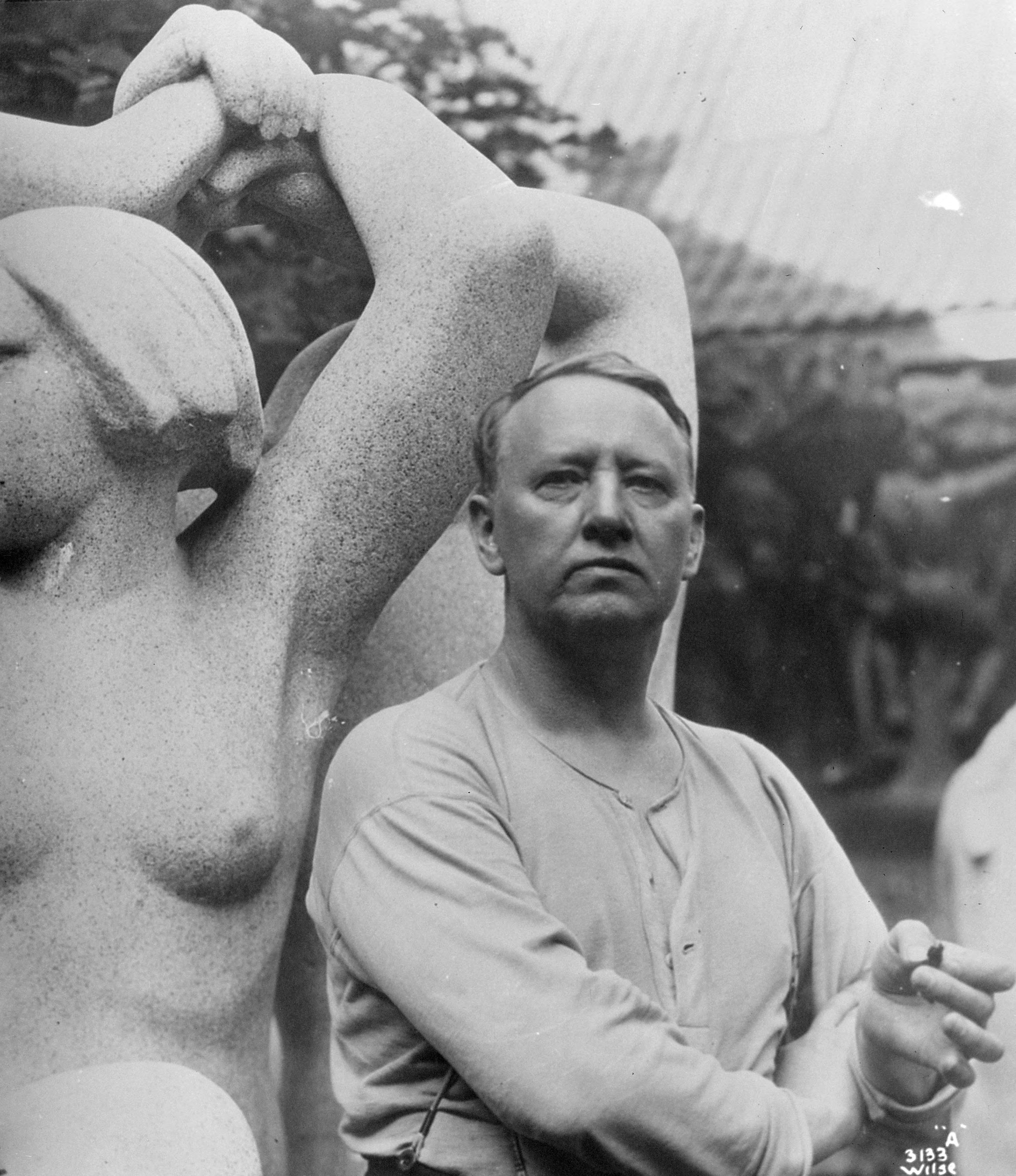
Vigeland

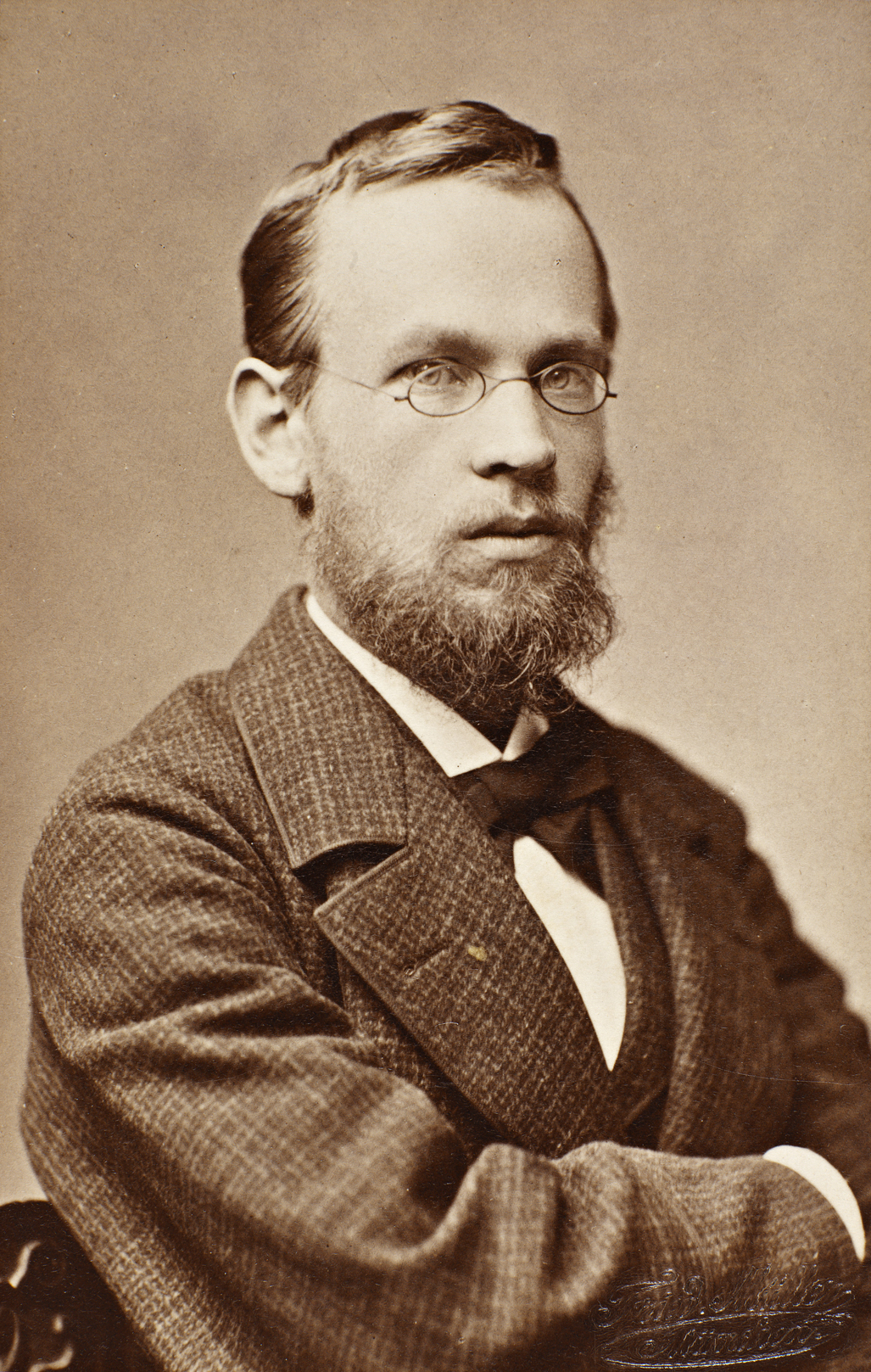
Werenskiold

=== Film and comedy ===
- Hauk Aabel, actor
- Atle Antonsen, comedian
- Ivo Caprino, animation film creator
- Lalla Carlsen, actress
- Espen Eckbo, comedian, actor
- Egil Eide, silent film actor and director
- Harald Eia, comedian, actor
- John Emblem, comedian, actor
- Laura Gundersen, actress
- Jonathan Haagensen, actor
- Gunnar Haugan (1925–2009), character actor
- Solveig Haugan (1901–1953), stage and movie actress
- Harald Heide-Steen Jr., comedian, actor
- Per Heimly, photographer, jester
- Henrik Holm, actor
- Ola Isene, opera singer
- Otto Jespersen, comedian
- Bård Tufte Johansen, comedian
- Kristoffer Joner, actor
- David Knudsen, actor
- Geir Ove Kvalheim, director
- Mette Lange-Nielsen, actress
- Natassia Malthe, model, actress
- Henny Moan, actress
- Lillian Müller, model, actress
- August Oddvar, stage actor
- Arve Opsahl, comedian, actor
- Iren Reppen, actress
- Tarjei Sandvik Moe, actor
- Kristopher Schau, comedian
- Aud Schønemann, actress
- Bjørn Sundquist, actor
- Rut Tellefsen, actress
- Gerd Thoreid, stand-up comedian and singer
- Liv Ullmann, actress, film director
- Ingerid Vardund, actress
- Line Verndal, actress
- Rolv Wesenlund, comedian, actor
- Ragna Wettergreen, actress
- Øystein Wiik, actor
- Viktoria Winge, actress
- Tommy Wirkola, film director
- Ylvis, comedy duo famous for their viral hit song and video "The Fox (What Does the Fox Say?)"
- Harald Zwart, film director

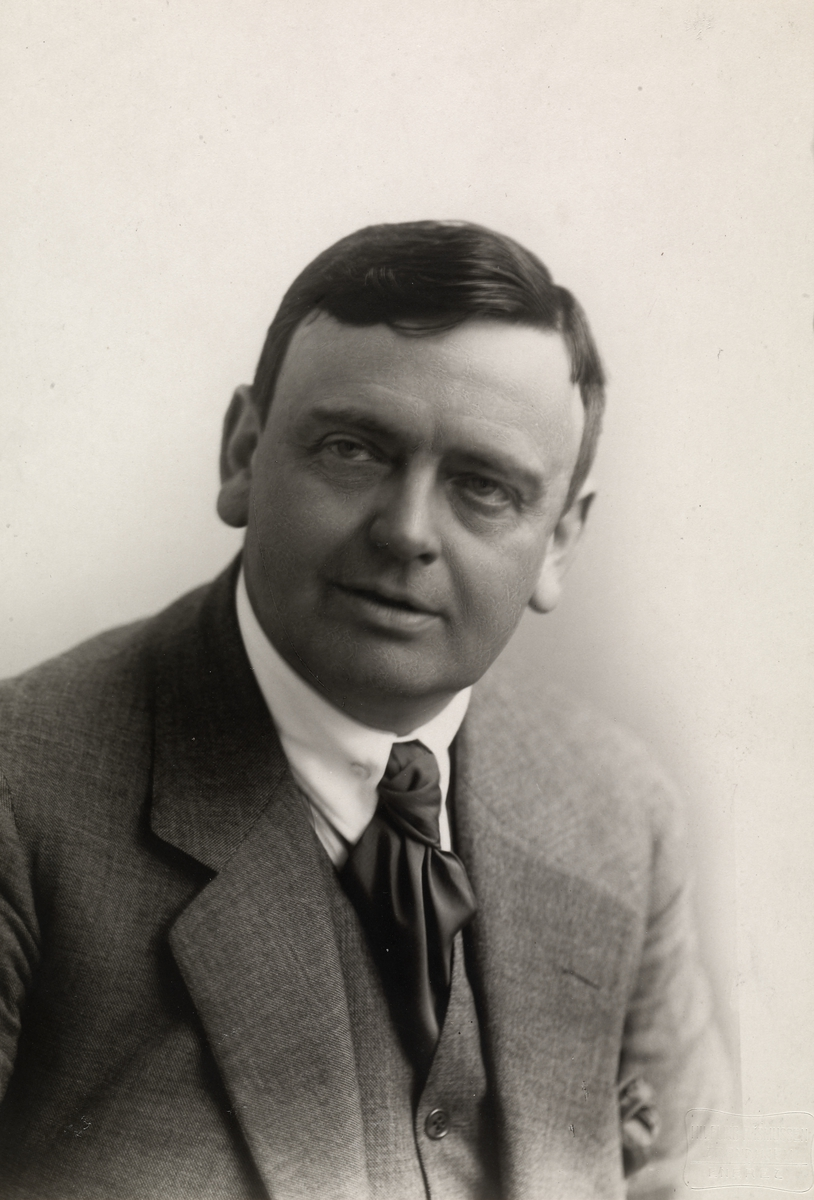
Aabel

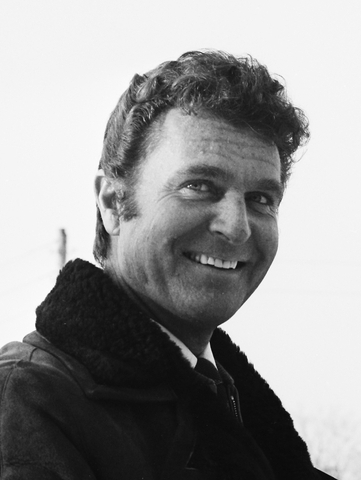
Caprino

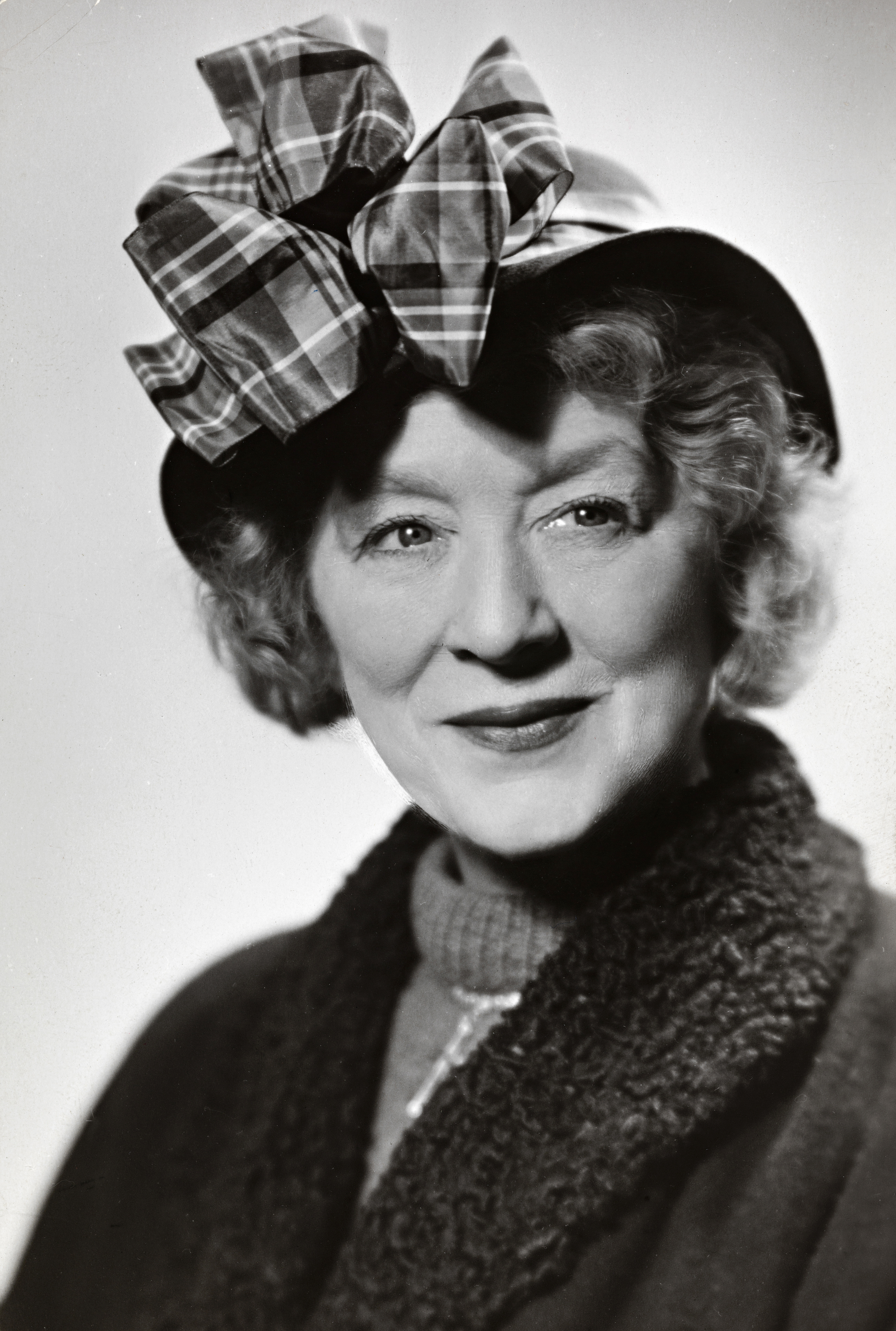
Carlsen

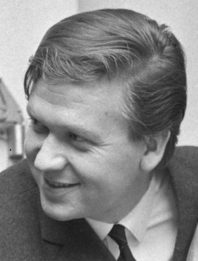
Heide-Steen Jr.

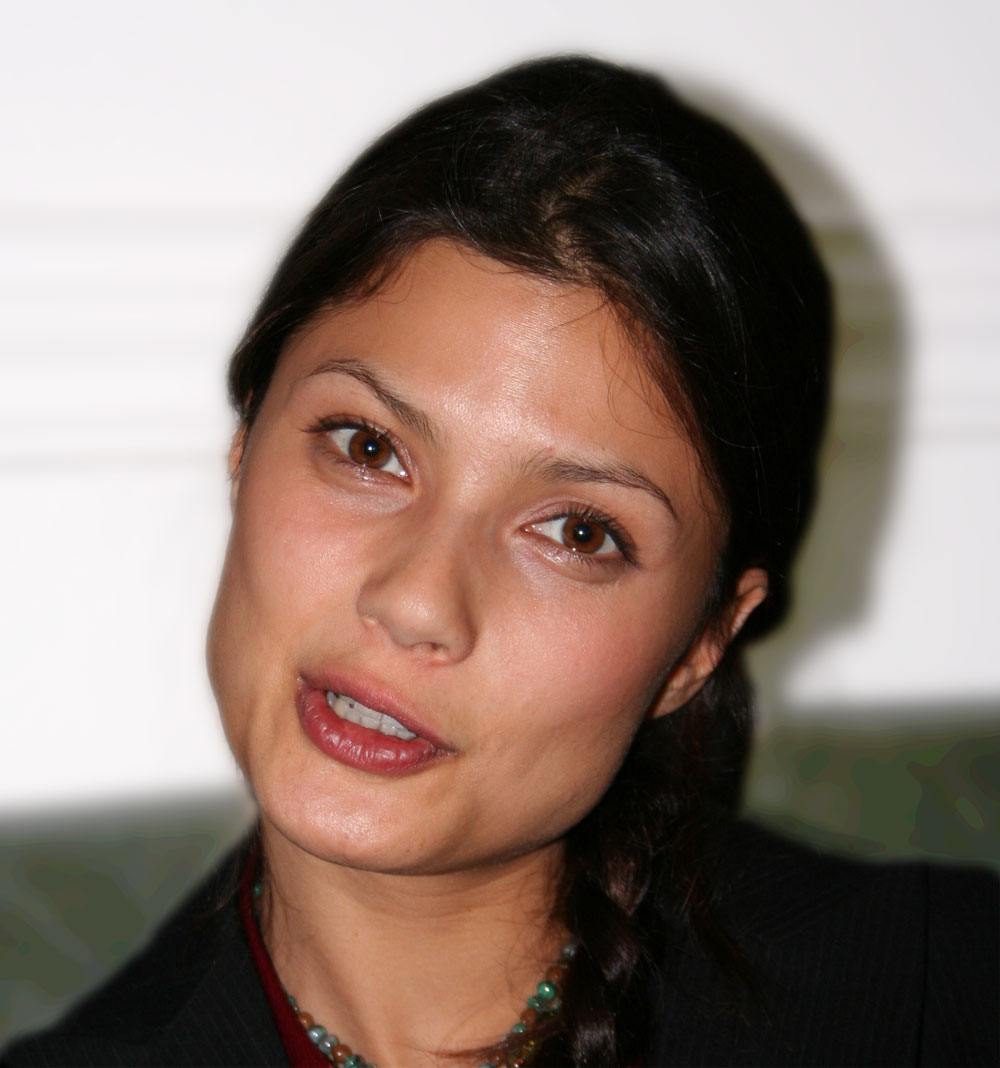
Malthe

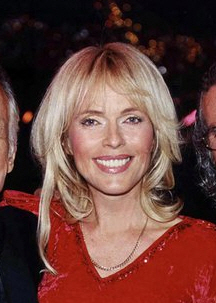
Müller

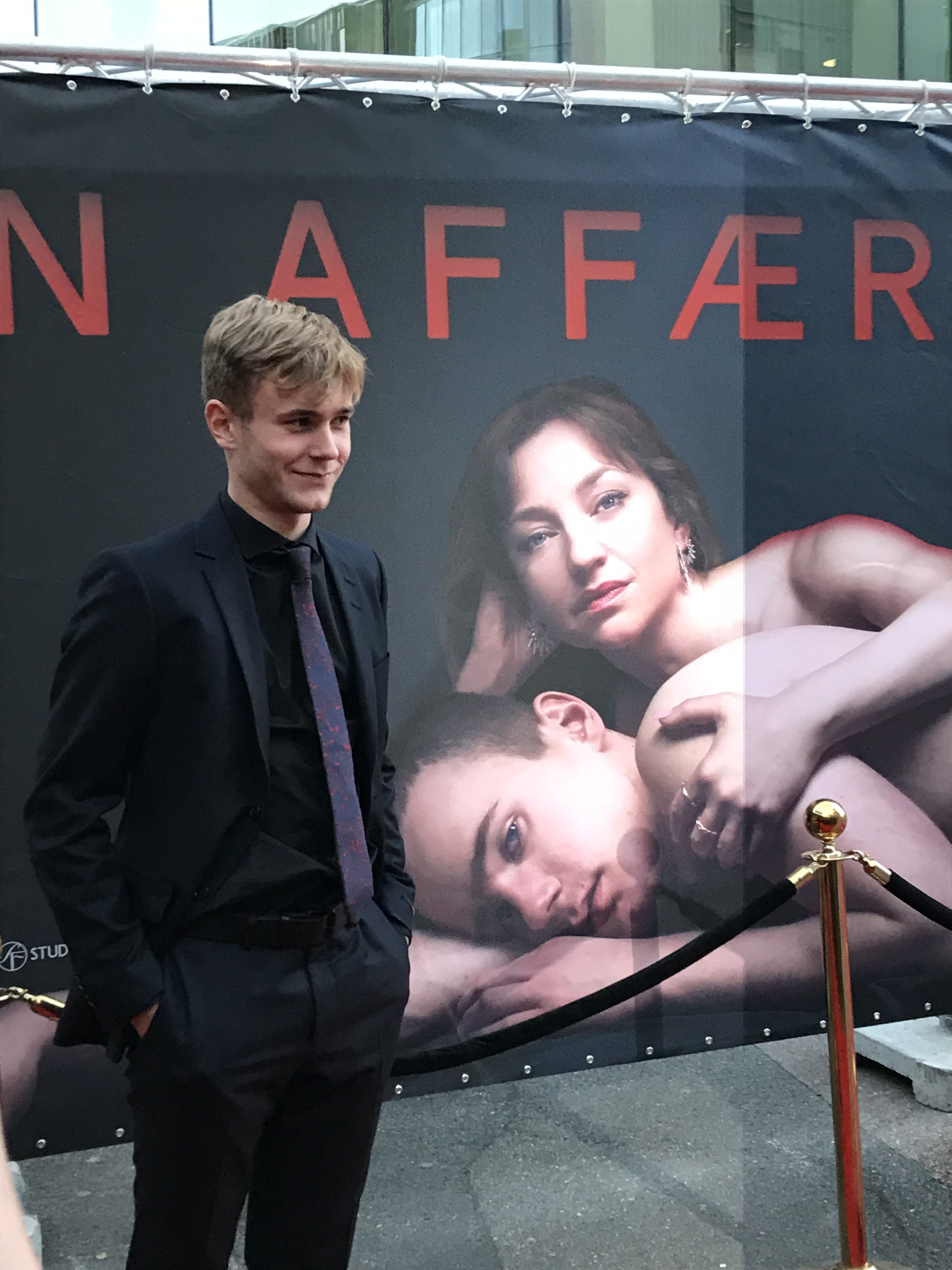
Moe

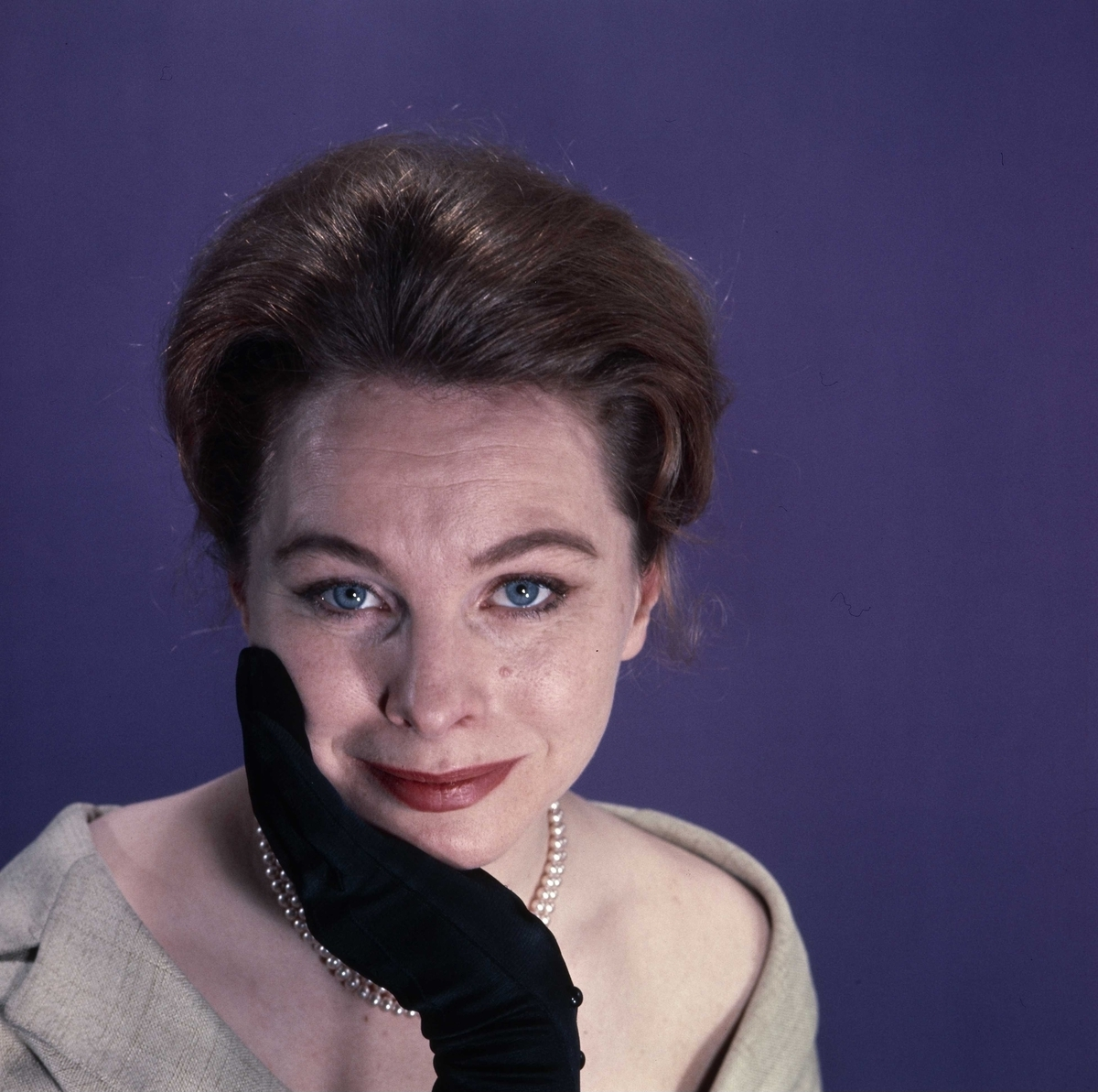
Tellefsen

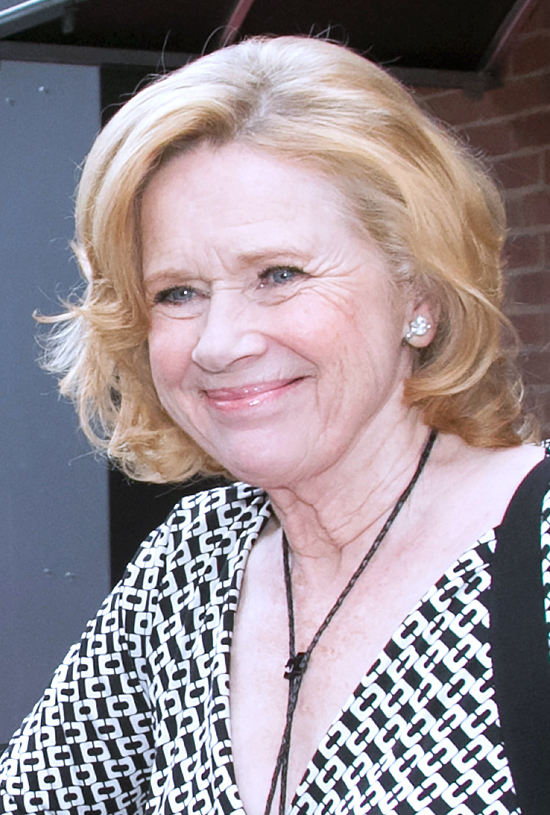
Ullmann

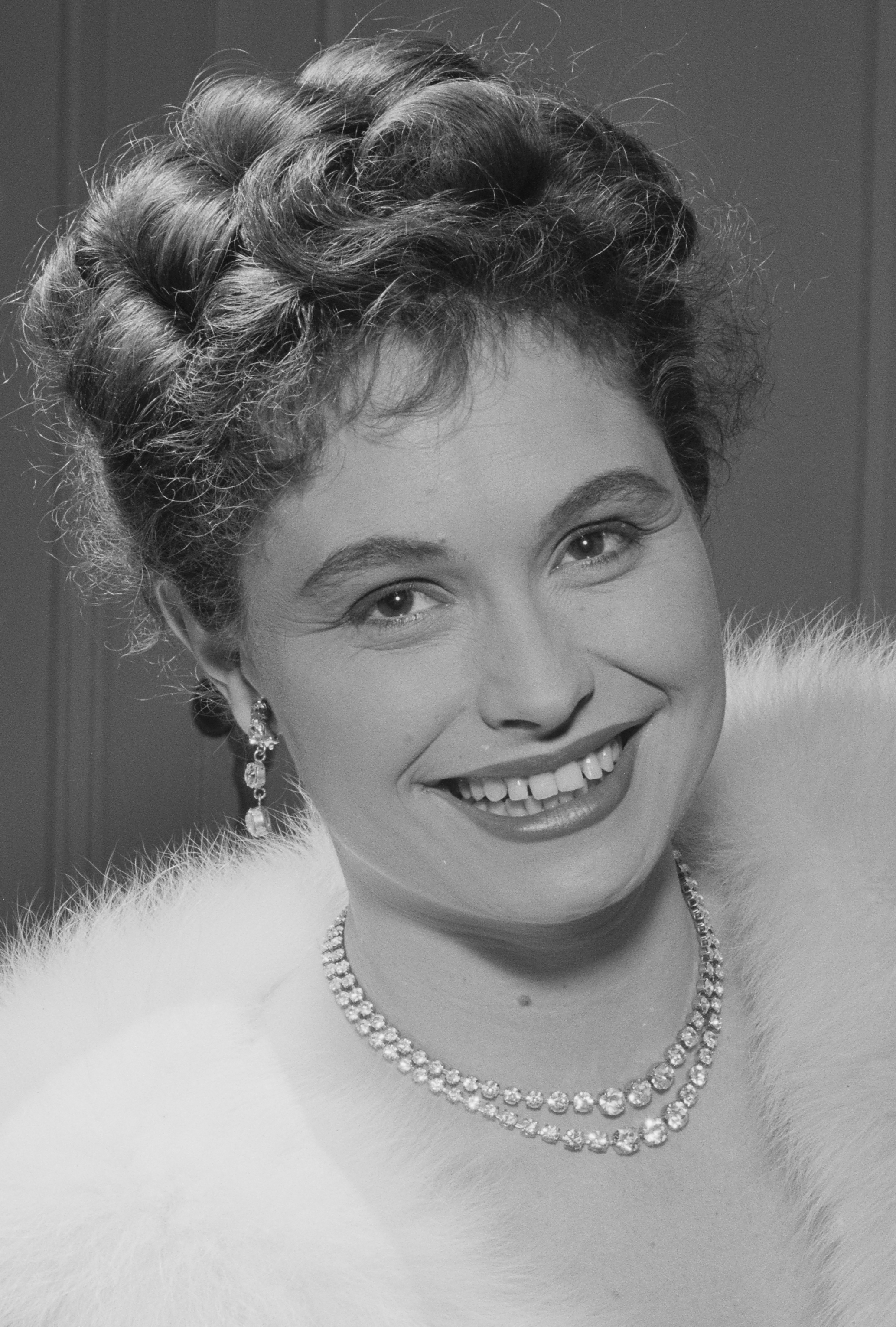
Vardund

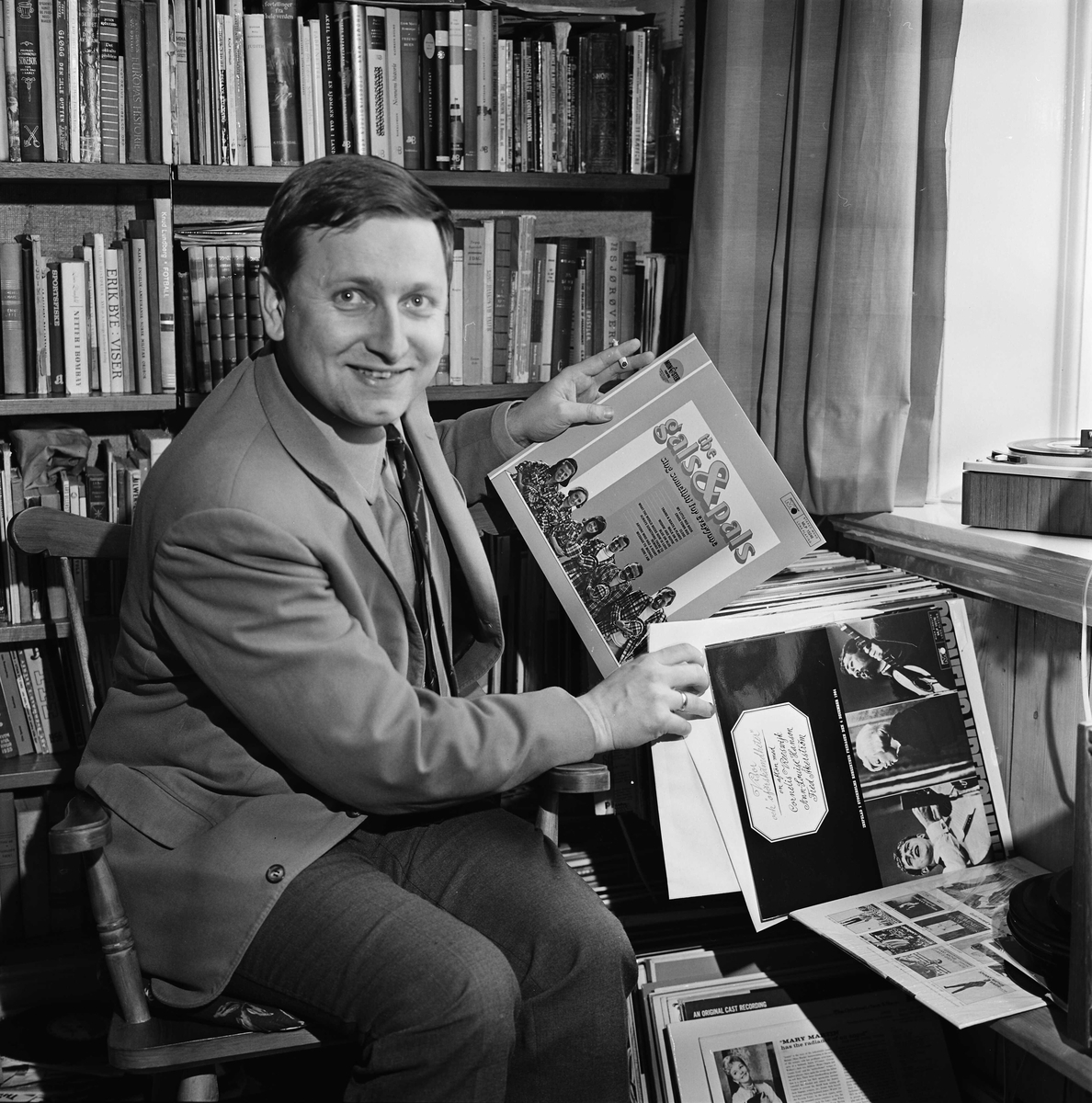
Wesenlund

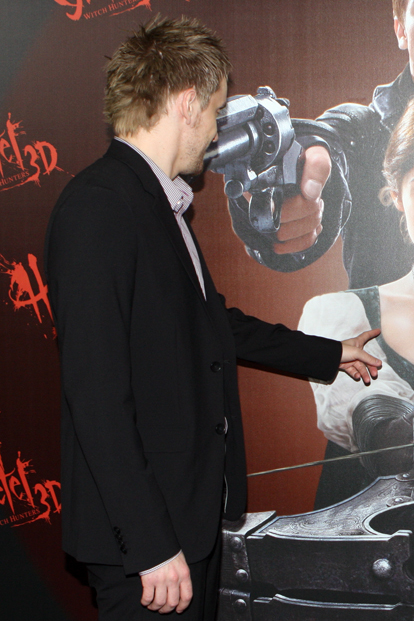
Wirkola

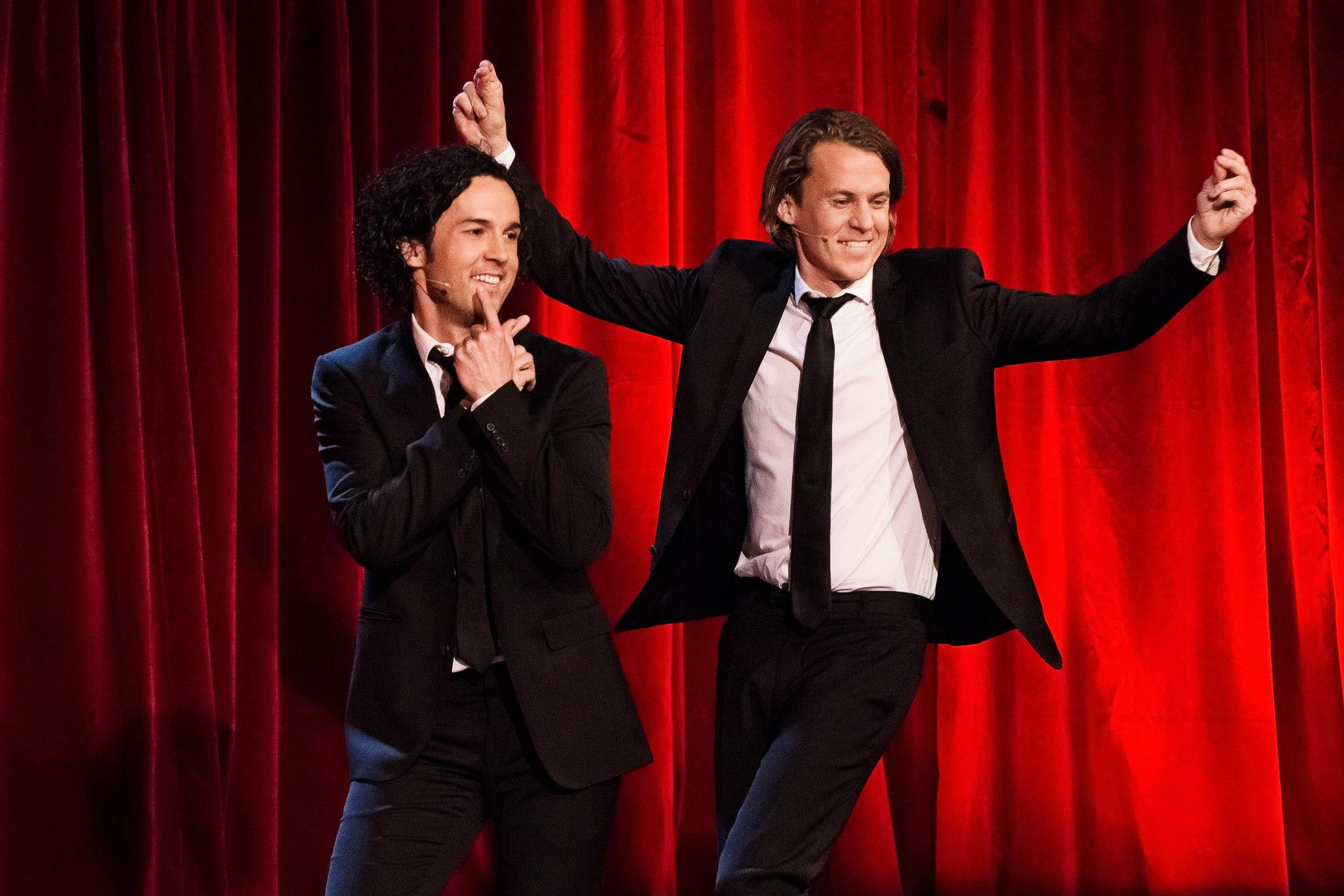
Ylvis

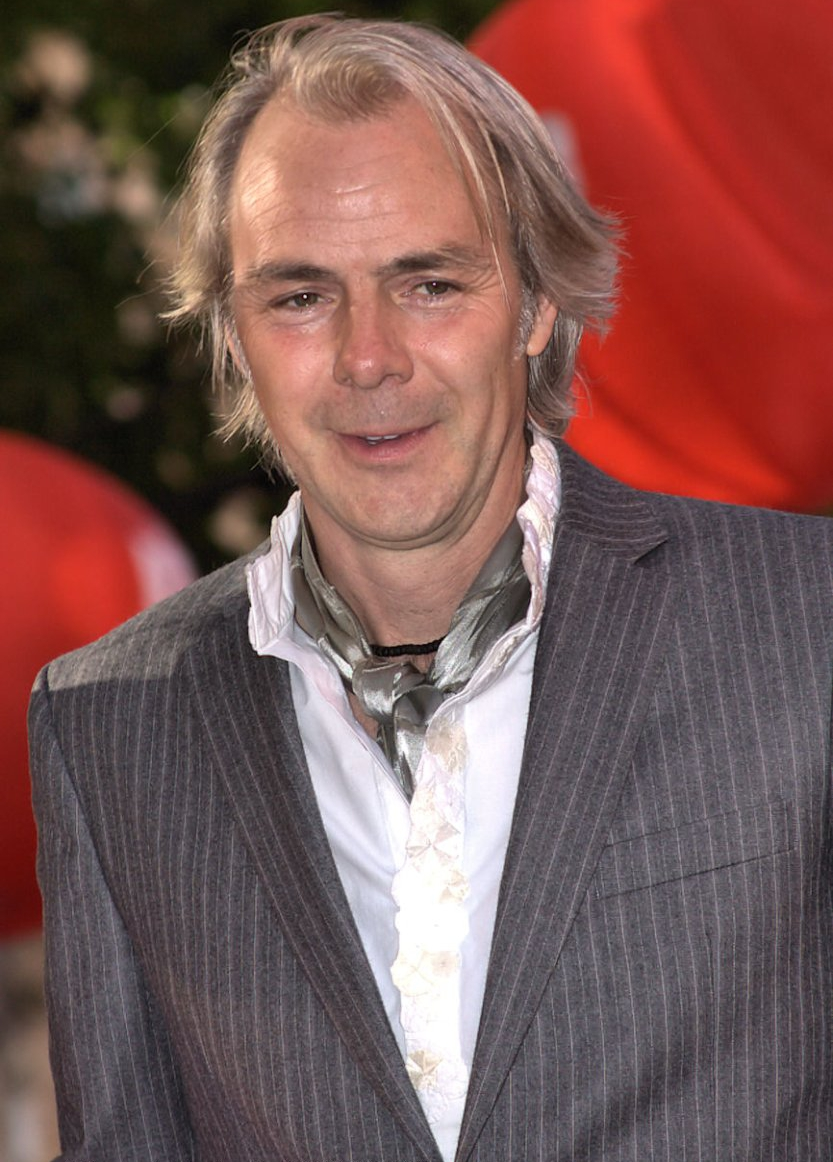
Zwart

== Exploration ==
- Roald Amundsen (1872–1928), polar explorer, first to reach the South Pole and the first seaman to traverse the Northwest Passage
- Bernt Balchen (1899–1973), Norwegian-American polar aviation pioneer
- Samuel Balto, arctic explorer
- Carl Bock, government official, author, naturalist and explorer
- Finn Devold (1902–1987), arctic explorer
- Hallvard Devold, polar explorer
- Leif Erikson, world explorer
- Rune Gjeldnes, polar (solo) adventurer
- Tryggve Gran (1889–1980), aviator, made the first solo flight across the North Sea
- Tormod Granheim, climber and extreme skier, 1st ski descent Mount Everest North Face, 2006
- Thor Heyerdahl (1914–2002), explorer and anthropologist, famous for his Kon-Tiki expedition
- Helge Ingstad (1899–2001), explorer, first to prove ca. 1000 AD Viking settlements in America
- Hjalmar Johansen (1867–1913), polar explorer
- Erling Kagge, polar solo adventurer, climber
- Carl Anton Larsen (1860–1924), Antarctic explorer and first person to ski in Antarctica on the Larsen Ice Shelf; considered the founder of the Antarctic whaling industry and the settlement at Grytviken, South Georgia
- Henry Larsen, Norwegian born Canadian Arctic seaman for the Royal Canadian Mounted Police; second to traverse Canada's Northwest Passage in the St. Roch
- Christian Leden (1882–1957), Greenland and Canada
- Lars Monsen, adventurer
- Jens Munk (1579–1628), explorer of the Northwest Passage
- Fridtjof Nansen (1861–1930), Arctic explorer, scientist and international statesman
- Børge Ousland, polar solo adventurer
- Finn Rønne (1899–1980), Norwegian-American antarctic explorer
- Otto Sverdrup (1854–1930), Arctic explorer

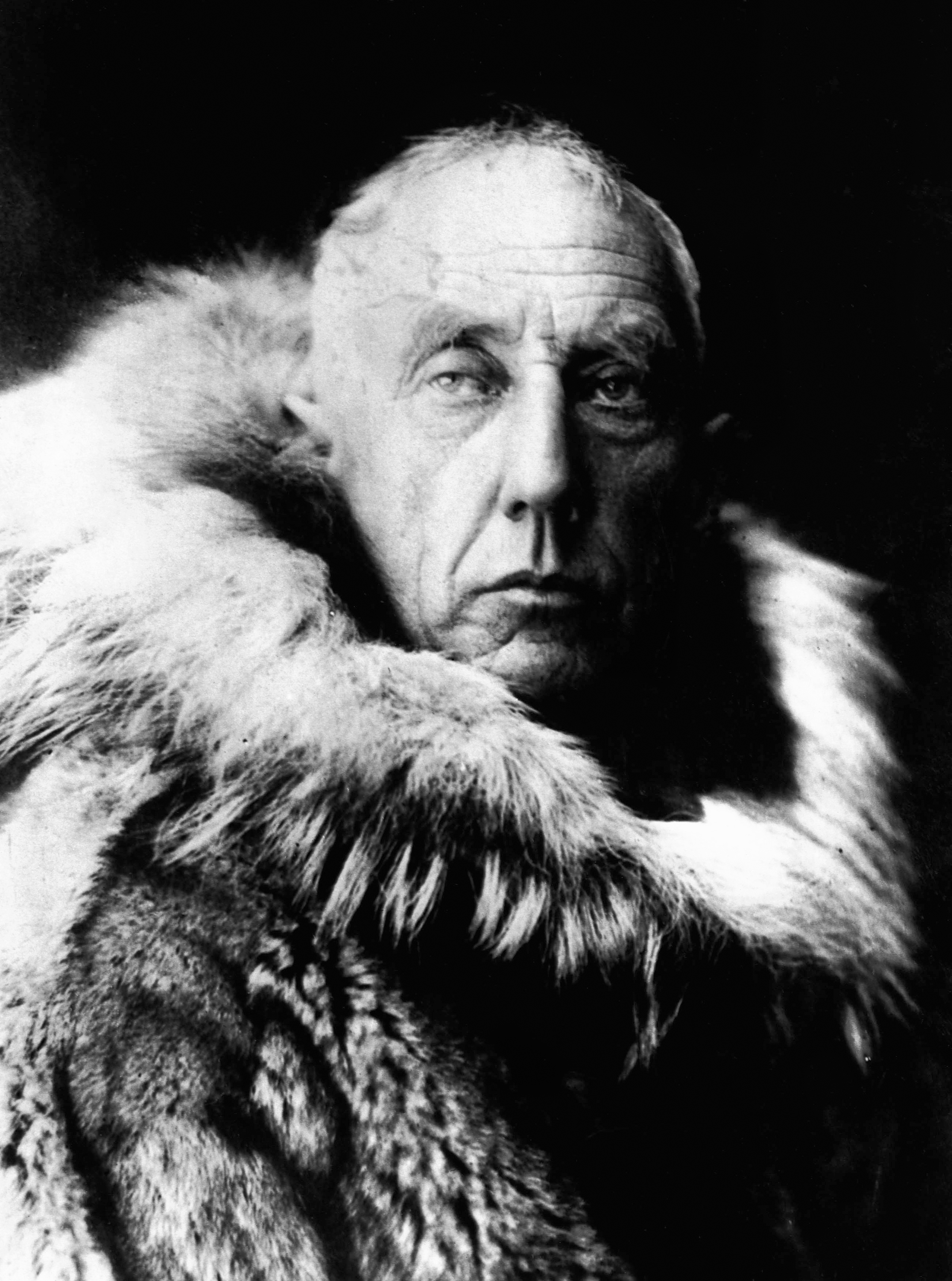
Amundsen

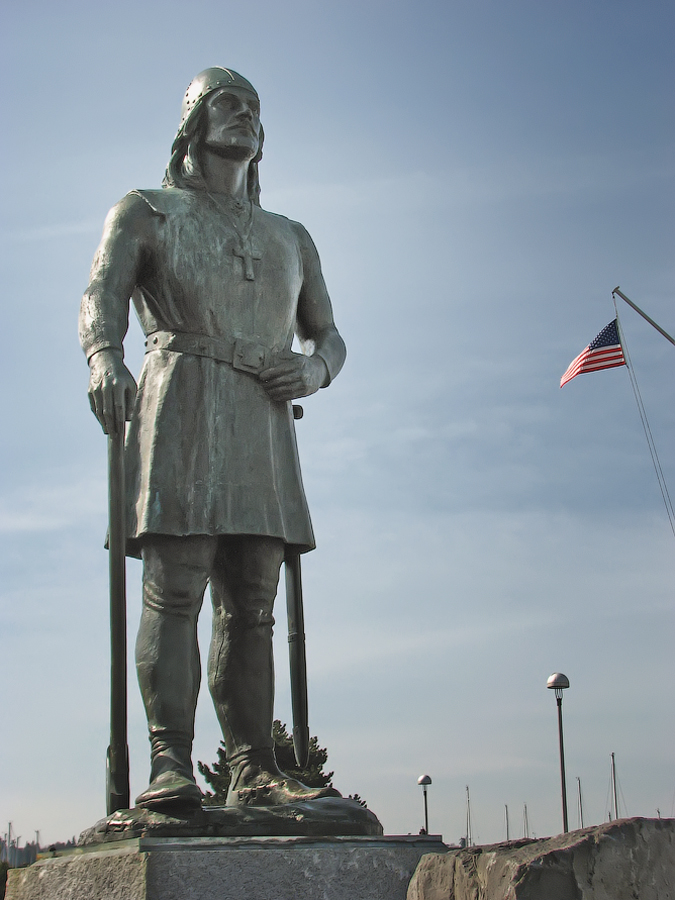
Erikson

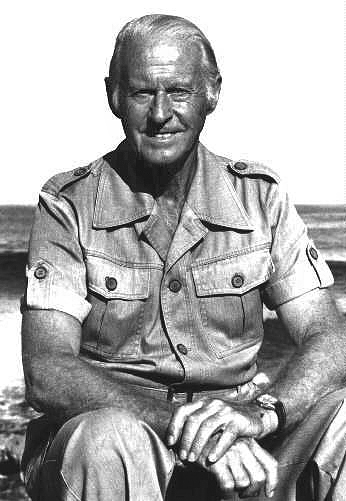
Heyerdahl

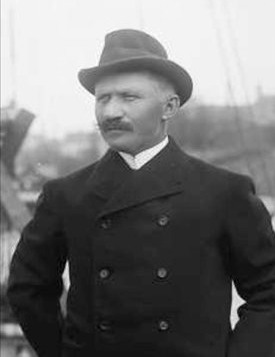
Johansen

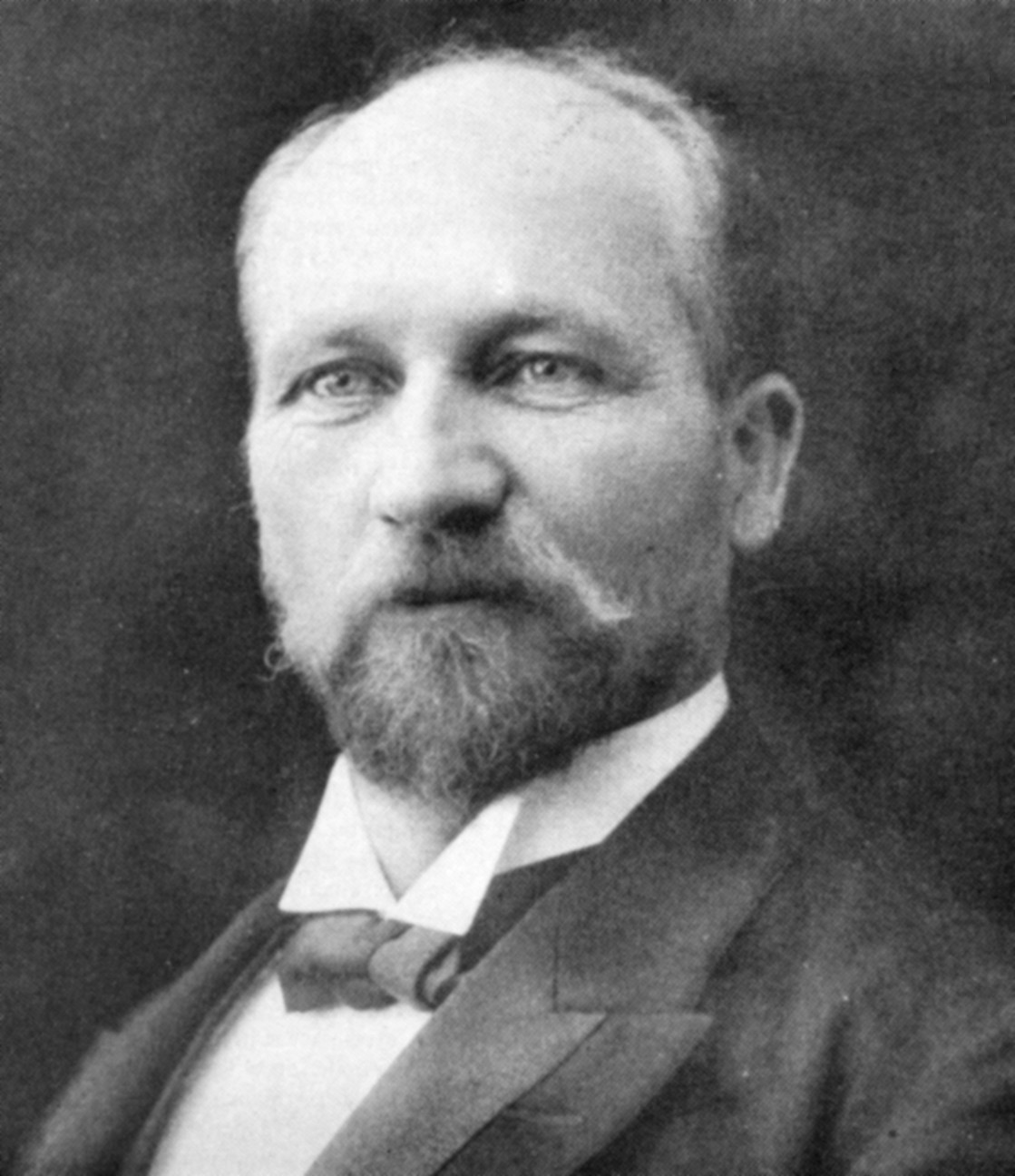
Larsen

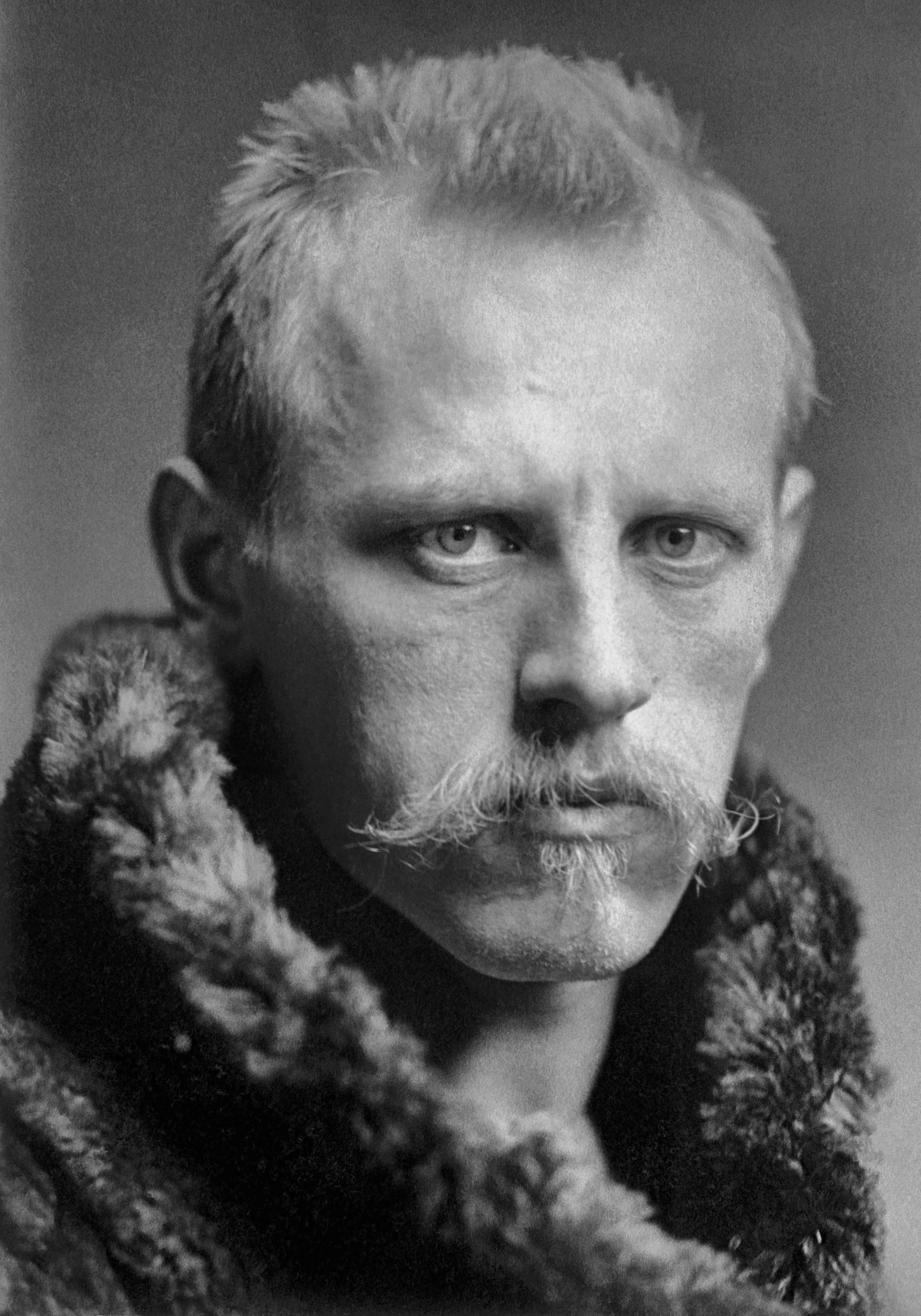
Nansen

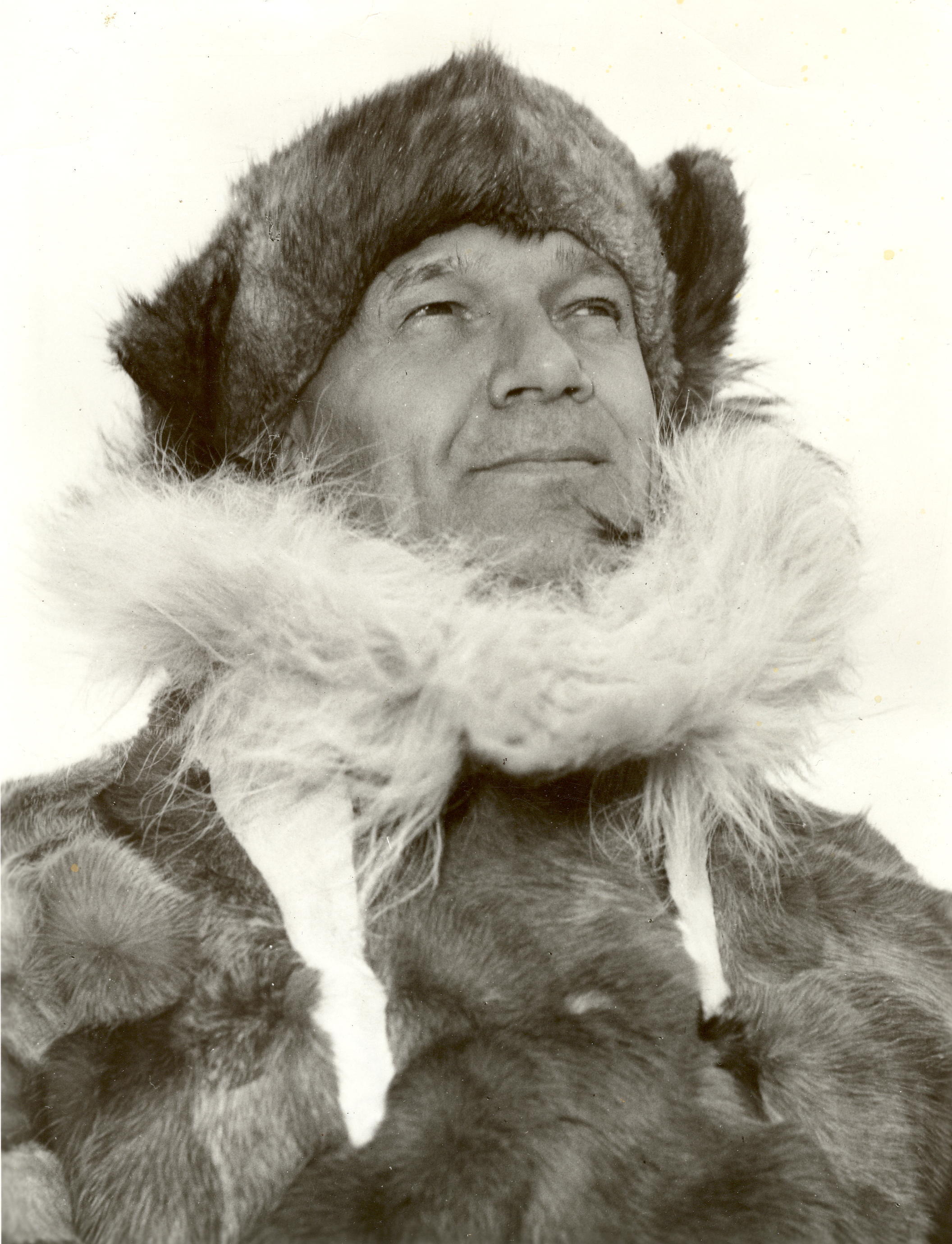
Ronne

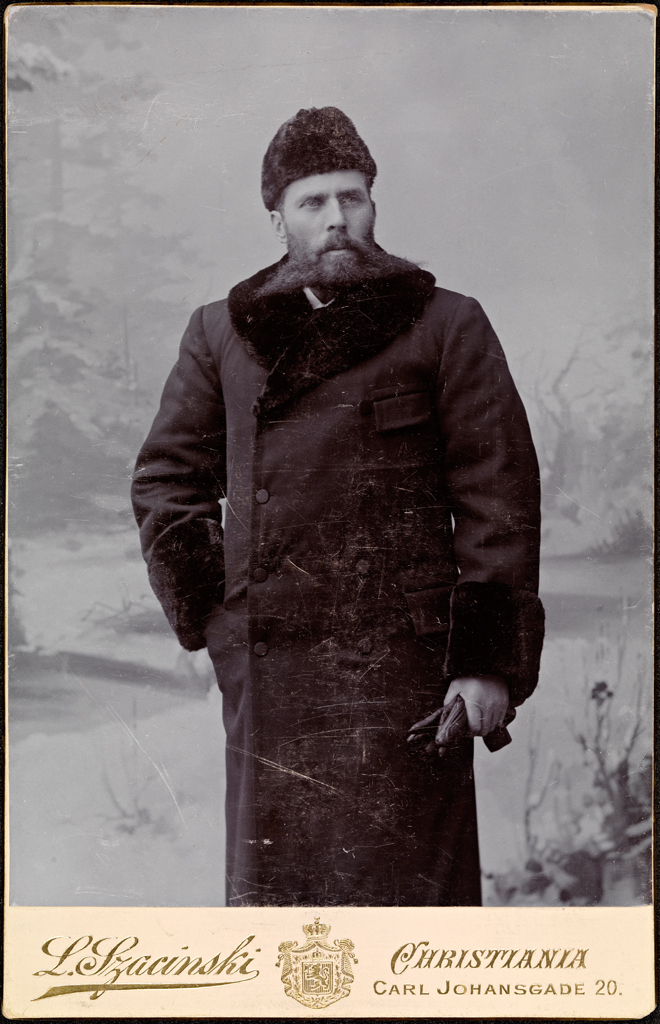
Sverdrup

== Politics ==
- Peder A. Aarøe, former trade unionist
- Arne Aasheim, diplomat and civil servant
- Gunstein Anderson (1860–1926), school inspector and politician for the Labour Party
- Ingrid Aune, Mayor of Malvik (2015–2019)
- Anton Christian Bang, former Minister of Education and Church Affairs
- Kjell Magne Bondevik, former prime minister, author
- Rebekka Borsch, politician for the Liberal Party
- Per Borten, former prime minister, author
- Trygve Bratteli, former prime minister, author
- Gro Harlem Brundtland, former prime minister, former director general of the World Health Organization, author, first female prime minister in Norway.
- Torstein Dahle
- Anton Kalvaa (1857–1922), trade unionist and politician
- Kristin Krohn Devold
- Odd Einar Dørum
- Jan Egeland, UN Under-Secretary-General for Humanitarian Affairs and Emergency Relief Coordinator
- Gunhild Emanuelsen (1914–2006), pacifist, women's rights activist, trade unionist and politician
- Jens Evensen
- Geir Flikke, political scientist
- Per-Kristian Foss
- Einar Gerhardsen, former prime minister, author
- Trond Giske
- Carl I. Hagen
- Kristin Halvorsen, former minister of finance
- C. J. Hambro
- Valgerd Svarstad Haugland, former leader of "Kristelig folkeparti", The Christian people's party.
- Marianne Heiberg
- Johan Jørgen Holst
- Sigurd Ibsen, author and politician
- Hilde Frafjord Johnson
- Mona Juul, diplomat
- Trygve Halvdan Lie, first UN Secretary-General
- Christian Michelsen, 1905 independence engineer
- Johan Nygaardsvold
- Anita Patel
- Jan Petersen
- Vidkun Quisling (1887–1945), military officer and fascist leader
- Terje Rød-Larsen, diplomat
- Erna Solberg, former prime minister
- Lars Sponheim
- Jens Stoltenberg, former prime minister, Secretary General of NATO
- Thorvald Stoltenberg, former minister of foreign affairs and minister of defence
- Shoaib Sultan, Muslim candidate for Oslo mayorship
- Elin Tvete
- Martha Tynæs (1870–1930), pioneering member of the Norwegian Labour Party's Women's Federation
- Marit Wikholm, politician for the Labour Party
- Kåre Willoch, former prime minister, author
- See also:
  - List of Norwegian prime ministers
  - List of Norwegian monarchs

== Sciences, research, engineering ==
- Odd Aalen, statistician
- Arne Jørgen Aasen (born 1939), chemist
- Ivar Aasen (1813–1896), linguist, nynorsk proponent
- Arnstein Aassve (born 1968), demographer and economist
- Niels Henrik Abel (1802–1829), mathematician
- Harald Tveit Alvestrand, computer scientist
- Colin Archer (1832–1921), ship builder
- Fredrik Barth, anthropologist
- Drude Berntsen (born 1939), computer scientist
- Kristian Birkeland (1867–1917), physicist and industrialist
- Vilhelm Bjerknes (1862–1951), meteorologist, father of modern weather forecasting
- Magne Børset (born 1958), physician
- Inga Bostad (born 1963), philosopher
- Viggo Brun (1885–1978), mathematician
- Sophus Bugge (1833–1907), linguist
- Fredrik Rosing Bull (1882–1925), data processing pioneer
- Christine Maria von Cappelen (1766–1849), botanist
- Ole-Johan Dahl (1931–2002), computer scientist, Turing Award laureate
- Daniel Cornelius Danielssen (1815–1894), dermatologist
- Finn Devold (1902–1977), marine biologist
- Jon Elster, political science and sociology
- Sam Eyde (1866–1940), inventor and industrialist
- Ragnar Frisch (1895–1973), economist, Nobel laureate
- Johan Galtung, peace and conflict research, The Right Livelihood Award laureate
- Ivar Giaever (1929–2025), physicist, biologist, Nobel laureate
- Ellen Gleditsch (1879–1968), radiochemist, student and friend of Marie Curie, Norway's second female professor
- Cato Guldberg
- Johan Ernst Gunnerus (1718–1773), naturalist, bishop of Trondheim
- Gerhard Armauer Hansen (1841–1912), discoverer of the leprosy bacterium
- Odd Hassel (1897–1981), chemist, Nobel laureate (1969)
- Trygve Haavelmo (1911–1999), economist, Nobel laureate
- Said Hadjerrouit, university professor of informatics and computer science
- Christopher Hansteen (1784–1873), physicist and astronomer
- Sonja Hanneborg (née Dedichen) (1902–1998), Norwegian scientist, student of Ellen Gleditsch and Marie Curie
- Johan Hjort (1869–1948), marine biologist, oceanographer, fisheries
- Peter M. Haugan, scientist and Director of the Geophysical Institute, University of Bergen
- Anne Stine Ingstad (1918–1997), archaeologist
- Geir Ivarsøy, co-developer of the Opera web browser
- Wilhelmine Mimi Johnson (1890–1980), geologist and physician
- Fred Kavli, inventor, business leader, Kavli prizes
- Jørgen Alexander Knudtzon, linguist
- Lars Monrad Krohn, engineer and entrepreneur
- Finn E. Kydland, economist, Nobel laureate
- Håkon Wium Lie, computer scientist, web pioneer and inventor of Cascading Style Sheets (CSS)
- Sophus Lie (1842–1899), mathematician
- Edvard Moser, neuroscientist, Nobel laureate (2014)
- May-Britt Moser, neuroscientist, Nobel laureate (2014)
- Jørgen Moe, folklorist, author and bishop
- Moltke Moe, folklorist
- Jan Mossin (1936–1987), financial economist
- P. A. Munch (1810–1863), historian
- Per Hjalmar Nakstad (1946), radiologist
- Kristen Nygaard (1926–2002), computer scientist, Turing Award laureate
- Arne Næss, philosopher
- Lars Onsager (1903–1976), physical chemist, Nobel laureate
- Sverre Petterssen (1898–1974), meteorologist
- Trygve Reenskaug, computer science (model–view–controller)
- Erik S. Reinert, heterodox economist
- Stein Rokkan (1921–1979), political scientist
- Thorleif Schjelderup-Ebbe, Norwegian zoologist
- Olaus Dons Schmidt (1895-1969), genealogist
- Atle Selberg (1917–2007), mathematician, Fields Medal laureate
- Thoralf Skolem (1887–1963), mathematician
- Dagmar Karin Sørbøe (born 1945), physiotherapist and women's rights activist
- Jørgine Stene Sørensen (1905–1997), Norwegian chemist
- Hans Ström (1726–1797), zoologist
- Ragnhild Sundby (1922–2006), zoologist
- Eilert Sundt (1817–1875), sociologist
- Georg Sverdrup (1770–1850), linguist
- Harald Sverdrup (1888–1957), oceanographer and meteorologist
- Ludwig Sylow (1832–1918), mathematician
- Rasmus Sørnes (1893–1967), inventor and clockmaker
- Tor Sørnes, inventor keycard lock
- Vebjørn Tandberg (1904–1978), engineer and industrialist
- Niels Treschow (1751–1833), philosopher
- John Ugelstad (1921–1997), pioneering scientist within the fields of polymer and colloid chemistry
- Olav Vadstein (born 1955), professor of microbial ecology at the Norwegian University of Science and Technology.
- Peter Waage
- Caspar Wessel (1745–1818), mathematician
- Knut Yrvin, computer scientist, founder and main creator of Skolelinux

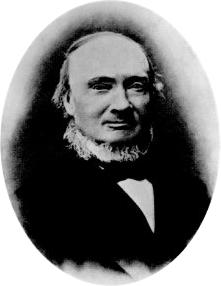
Aasen

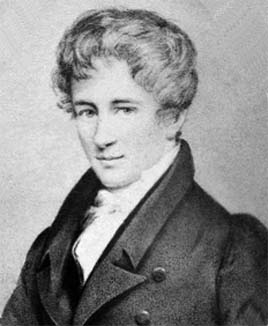
Abel

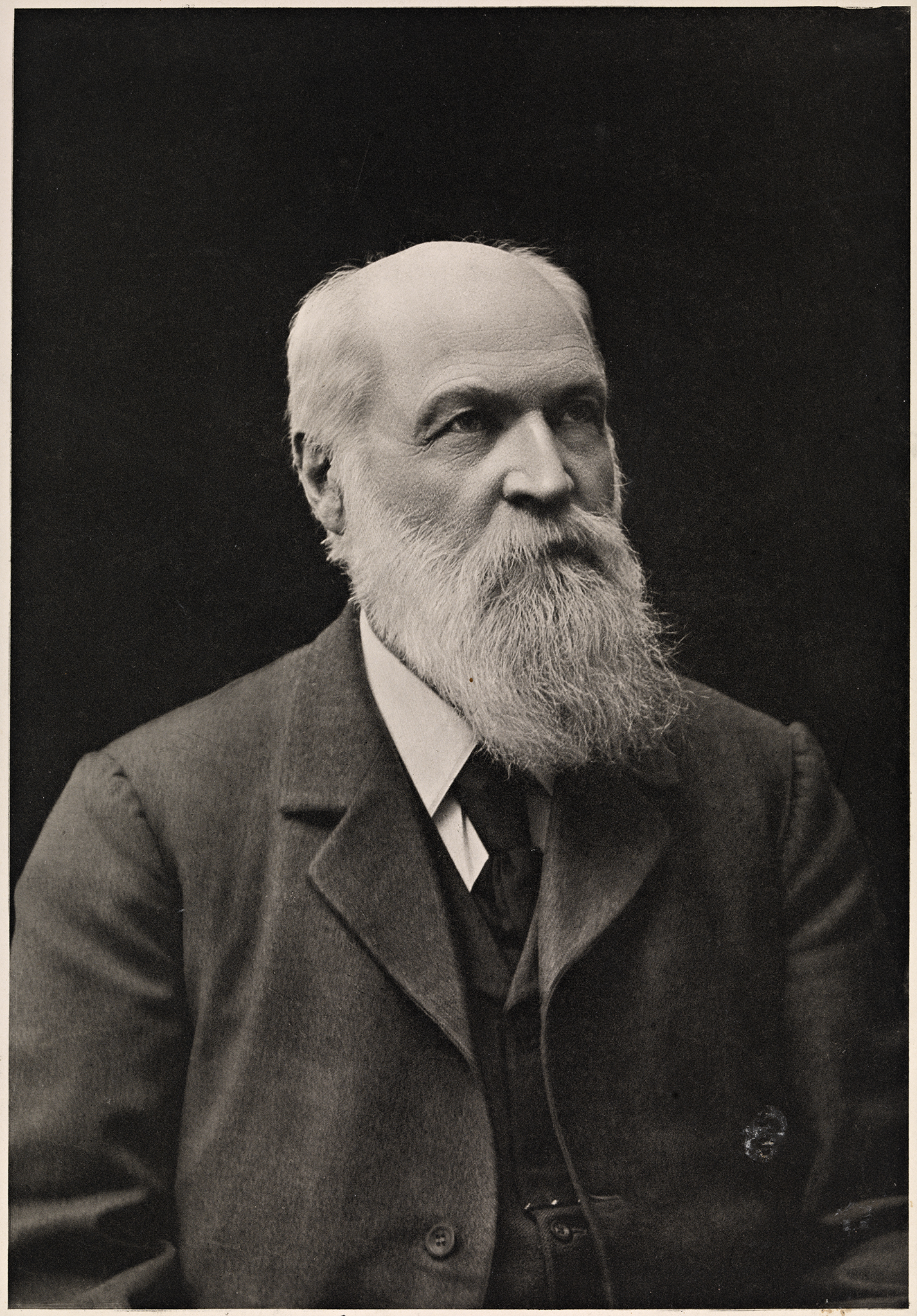
Archer

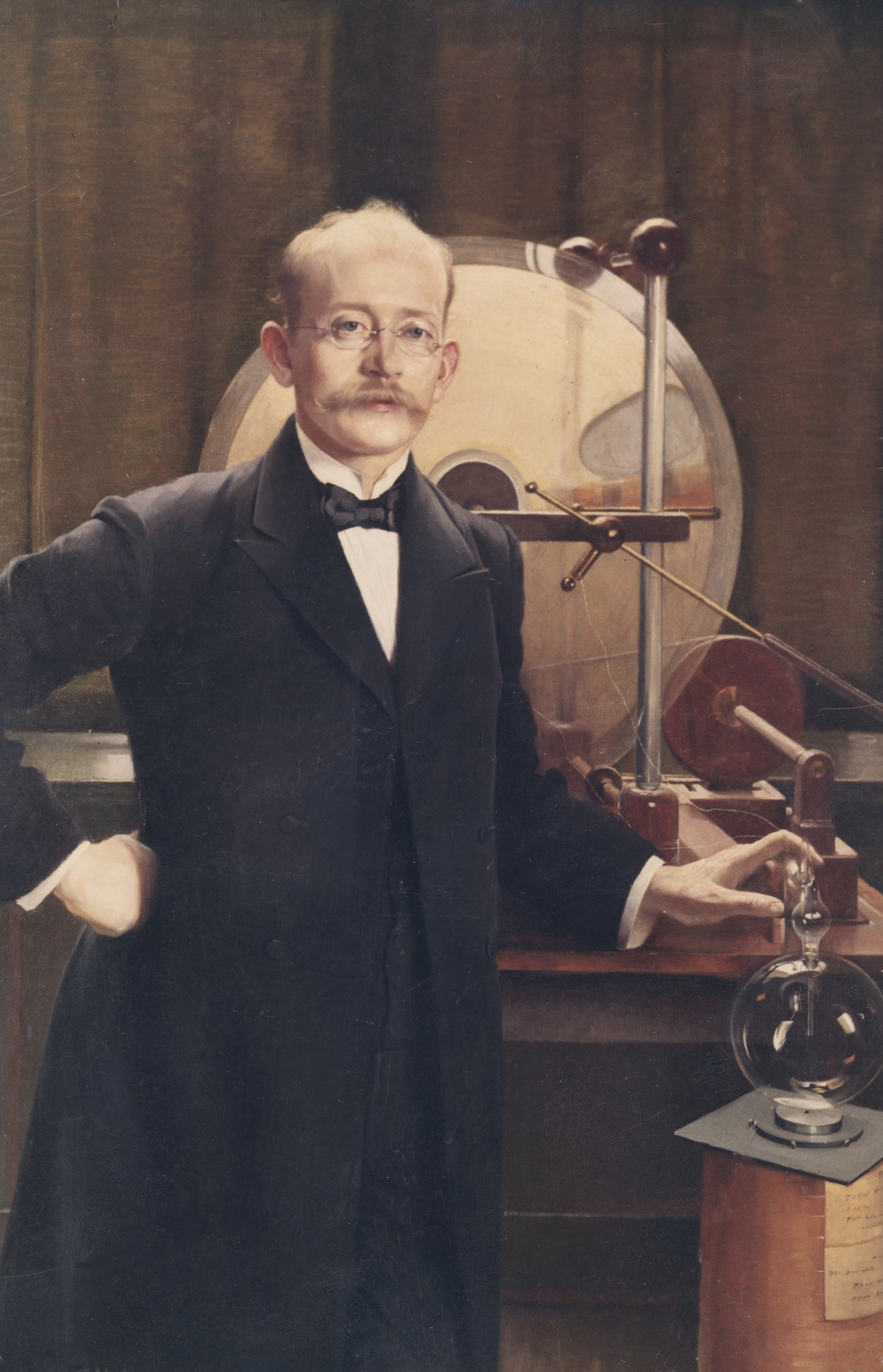
Birkeland

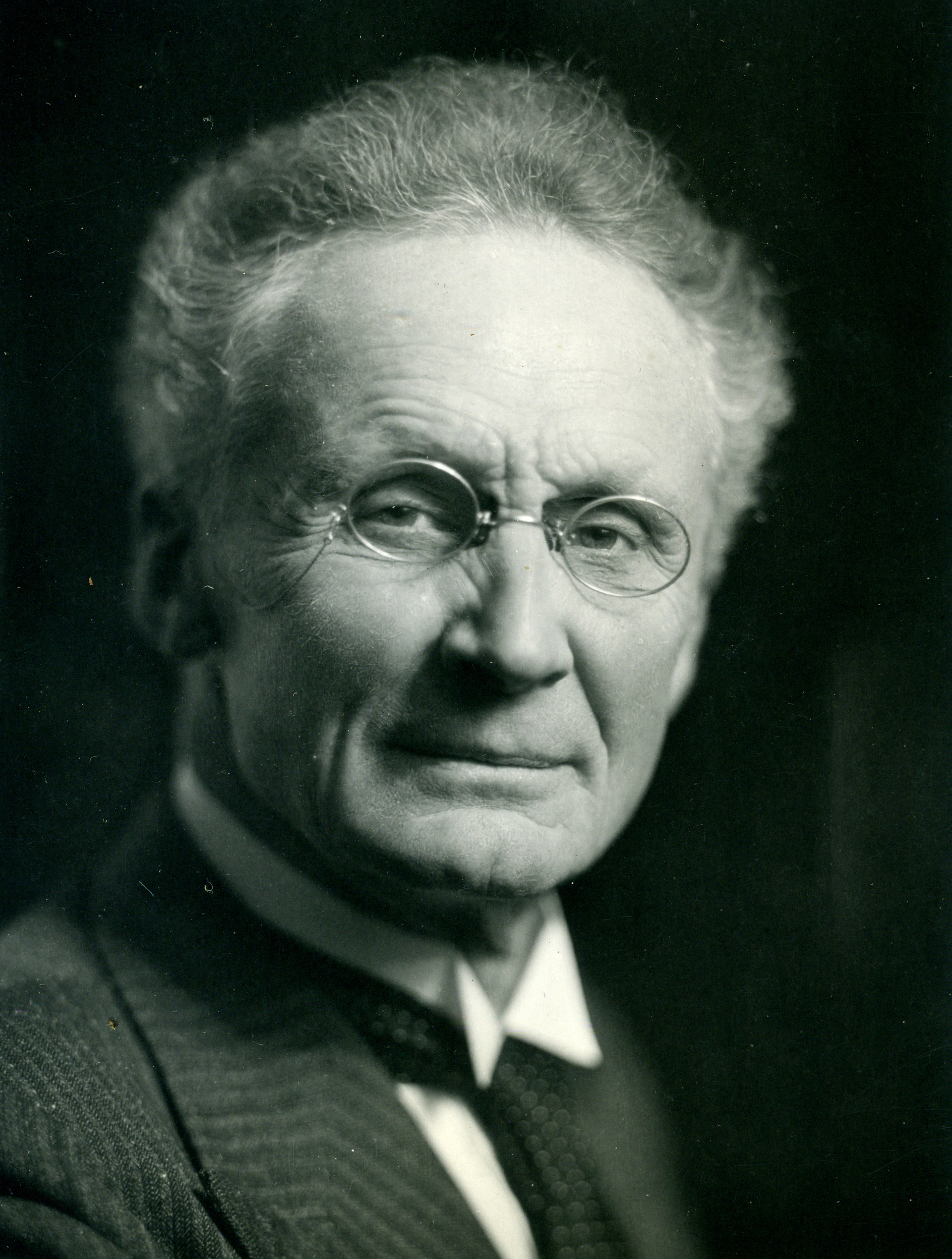
Bjerknes

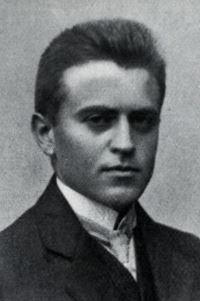
Brun

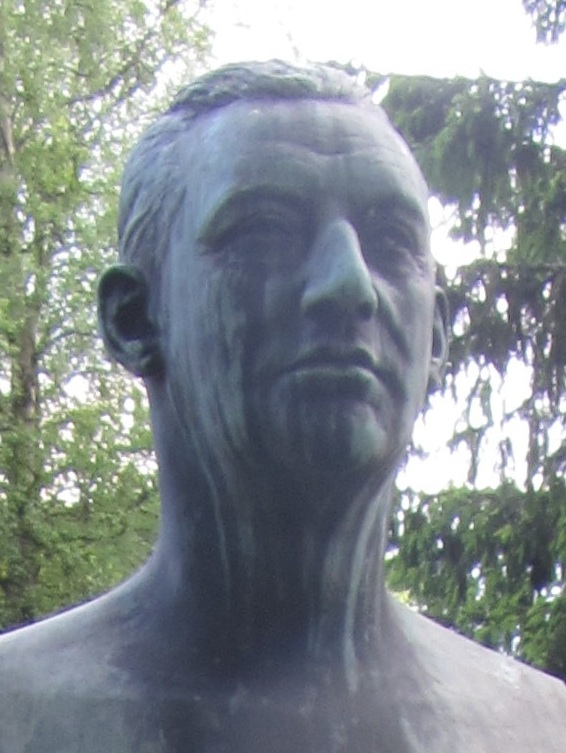
Frisch

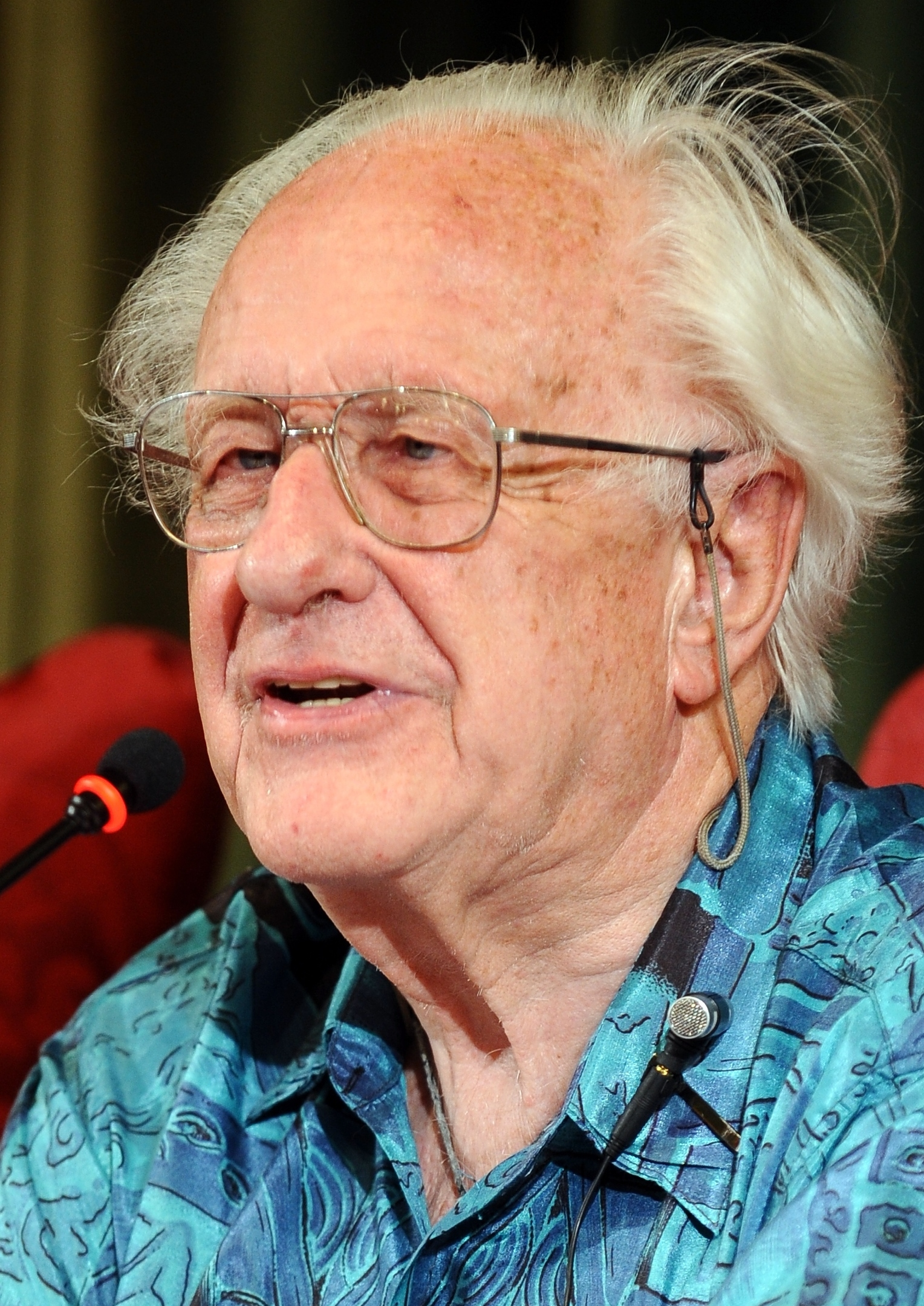
Galtung

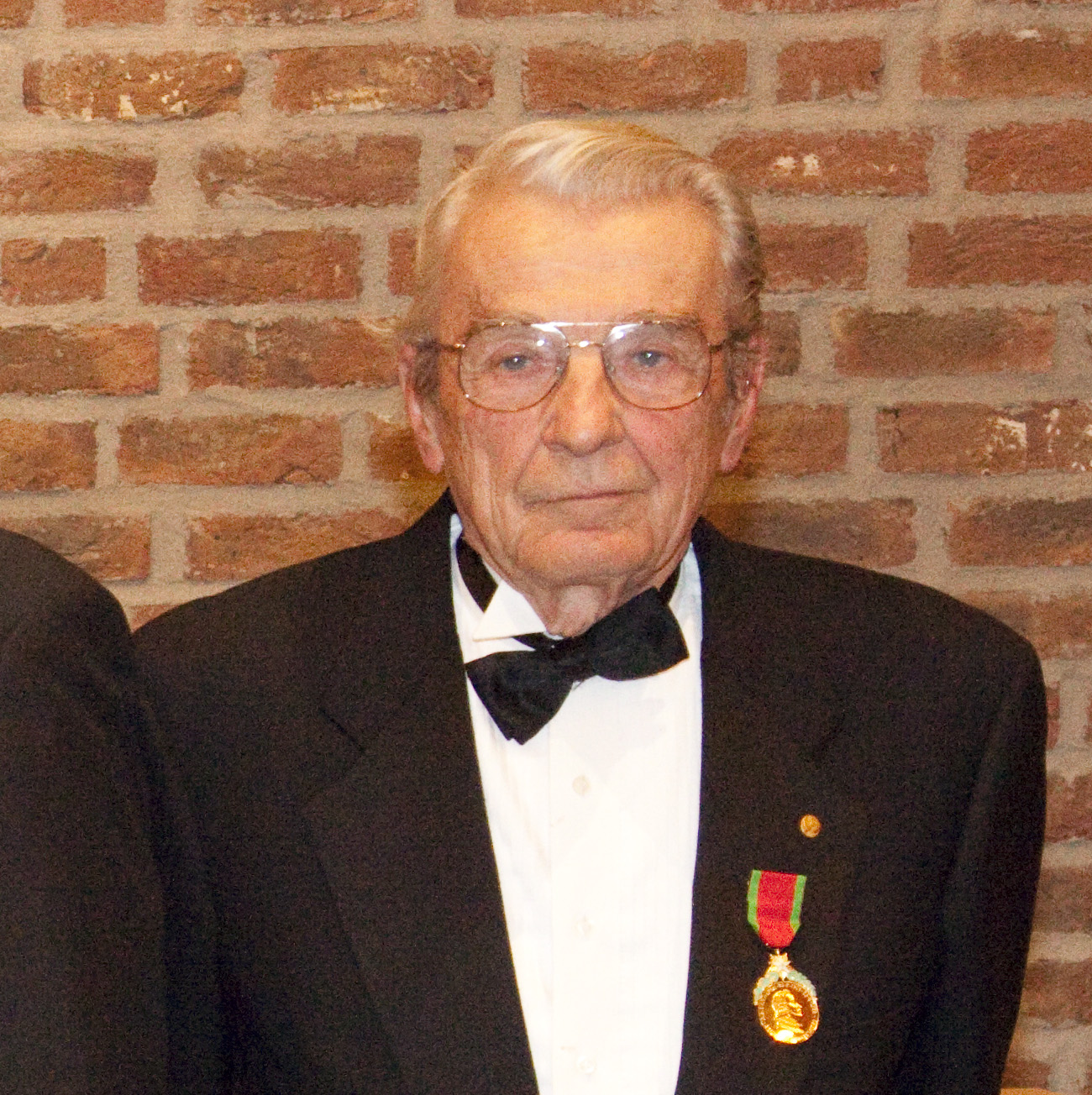
Giaever

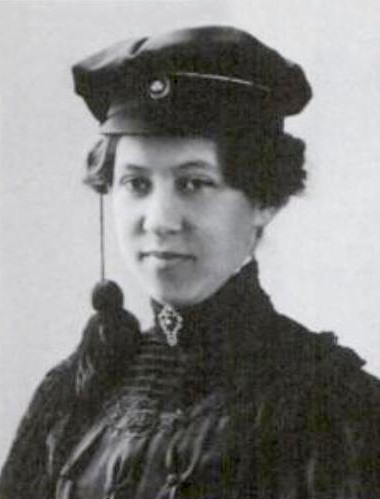
Gleditsch

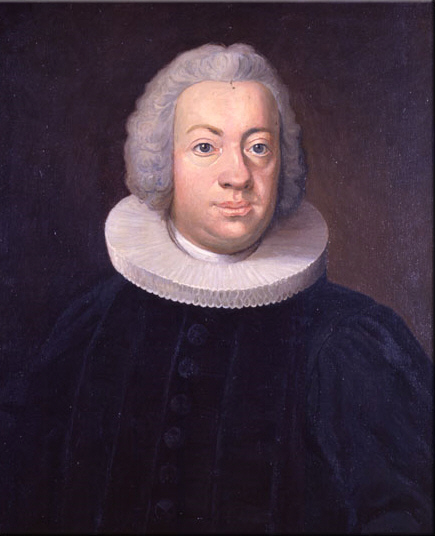
Gunnerus

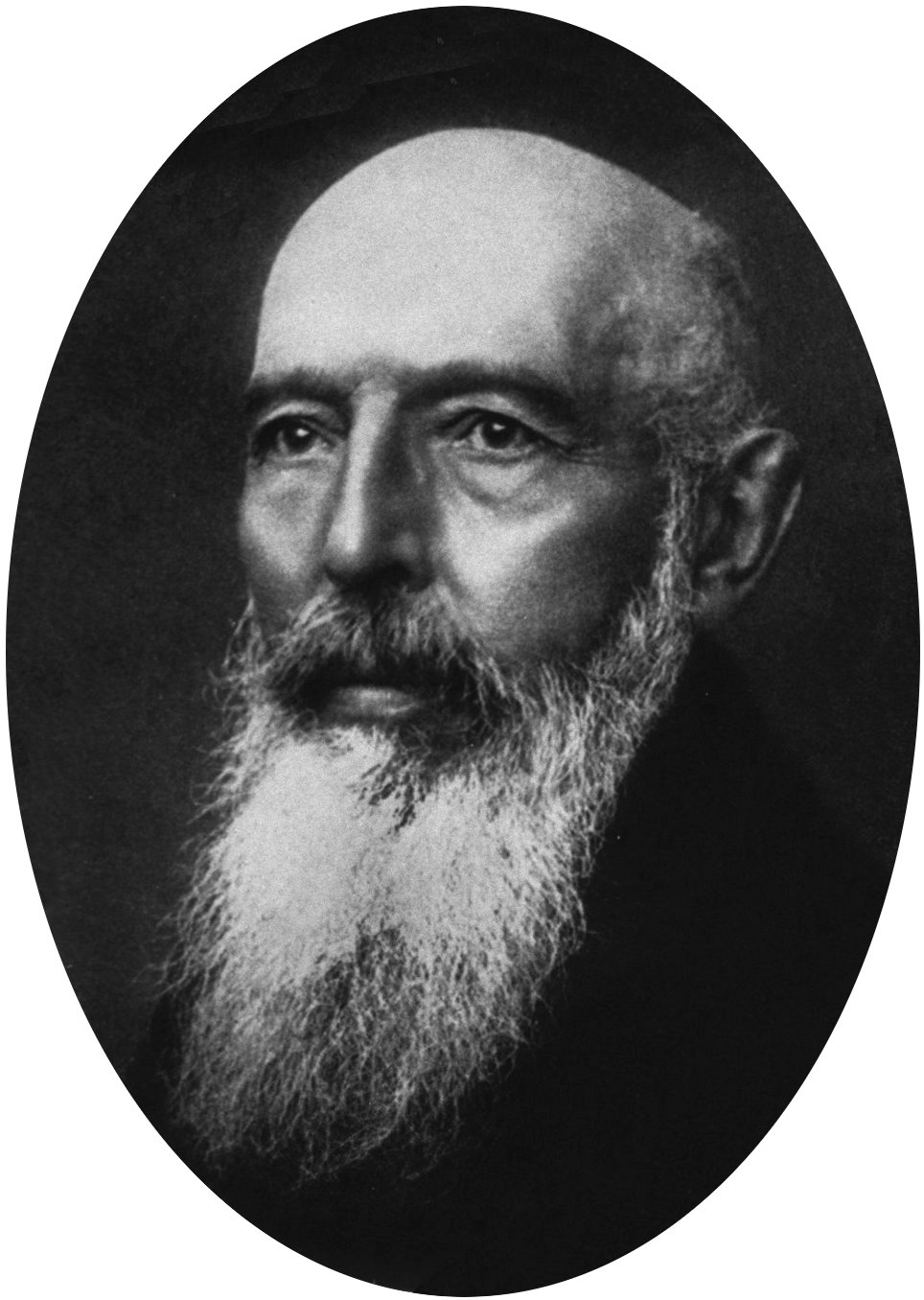
Hansen

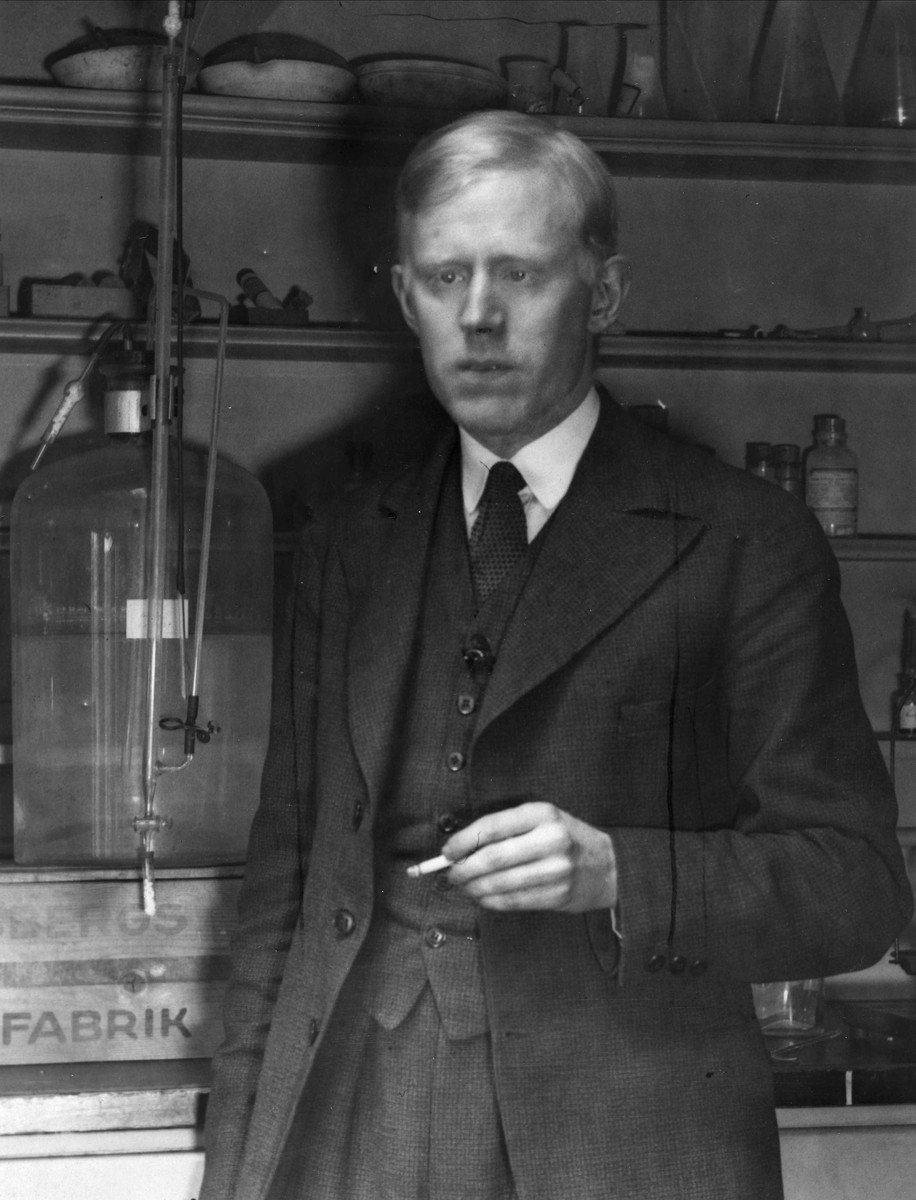
Hassel

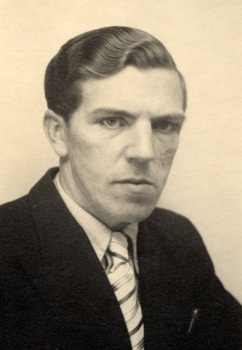
Haavelmo

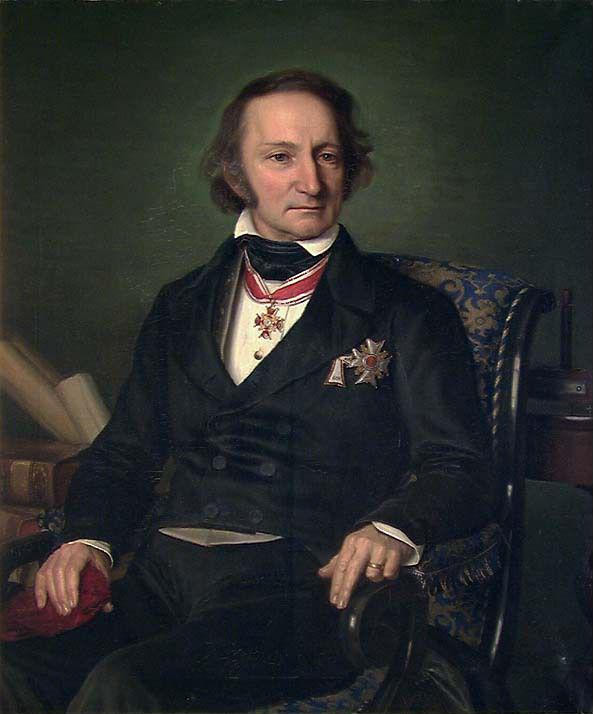
Hansteen

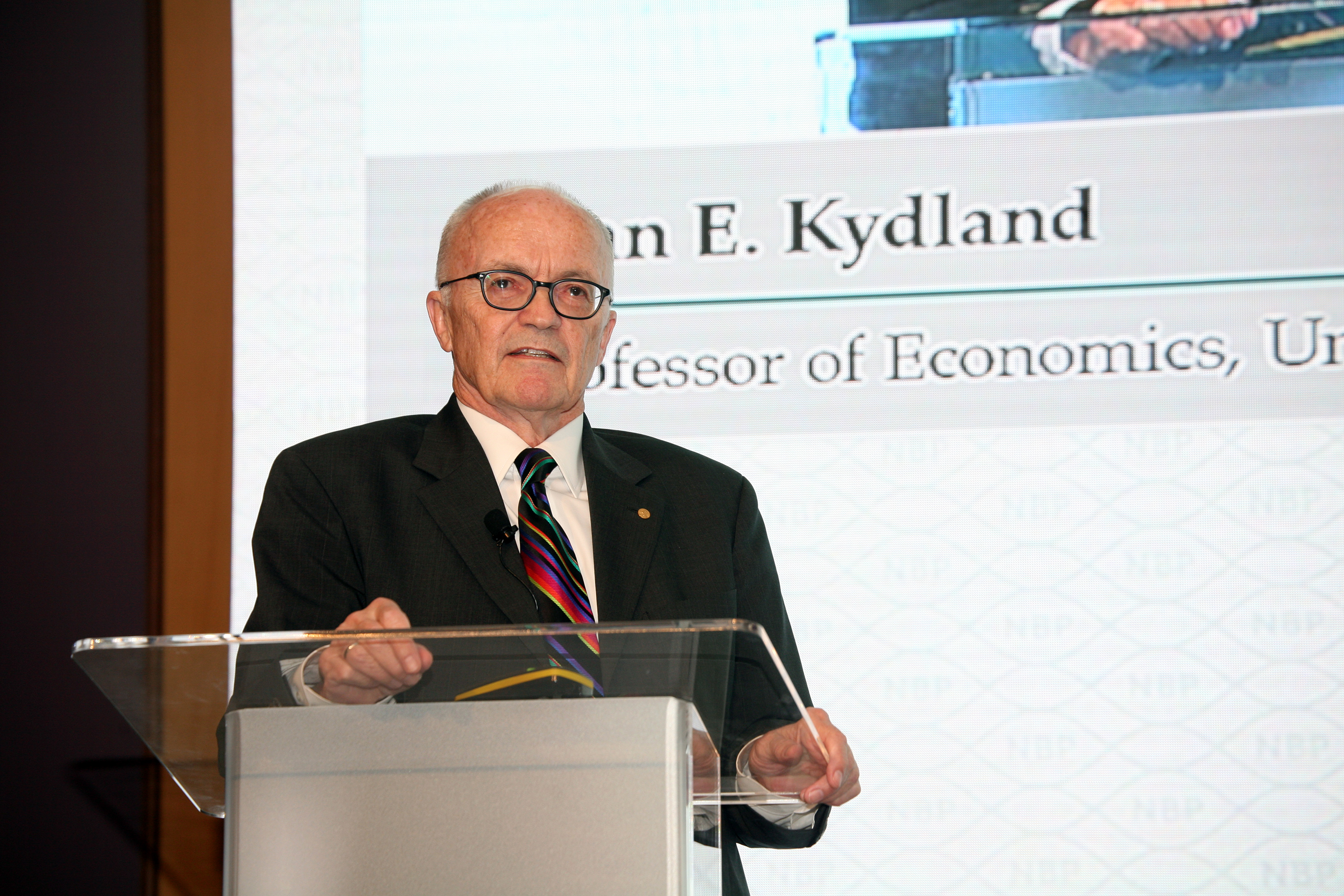
Kydland

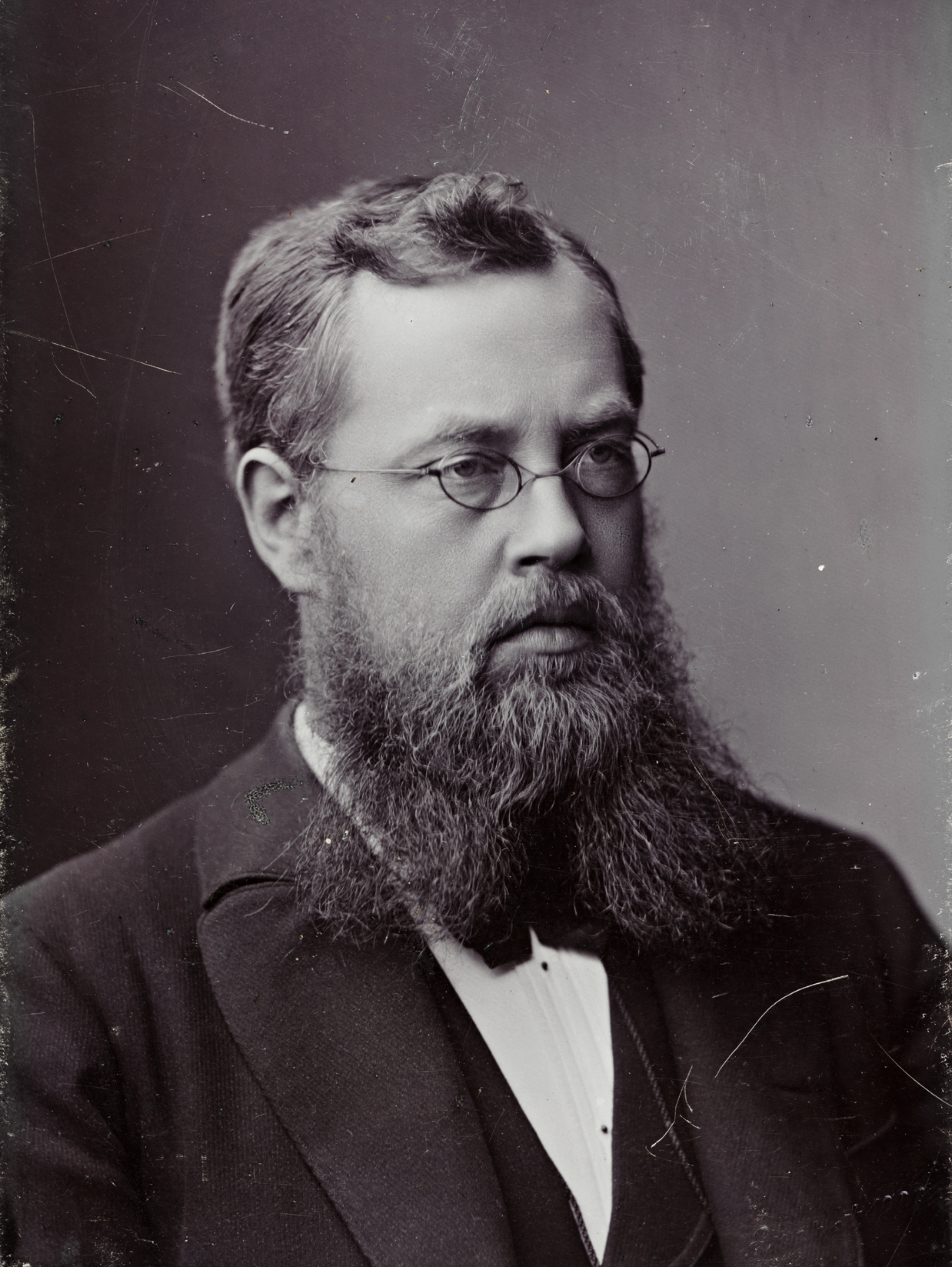
Lie

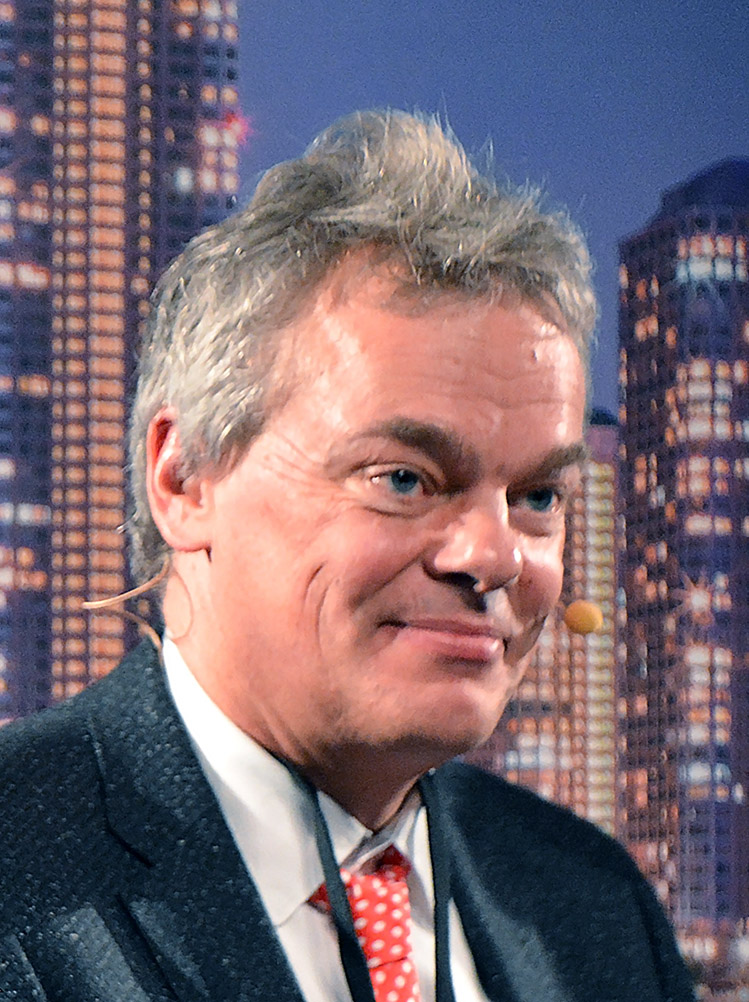
Moser

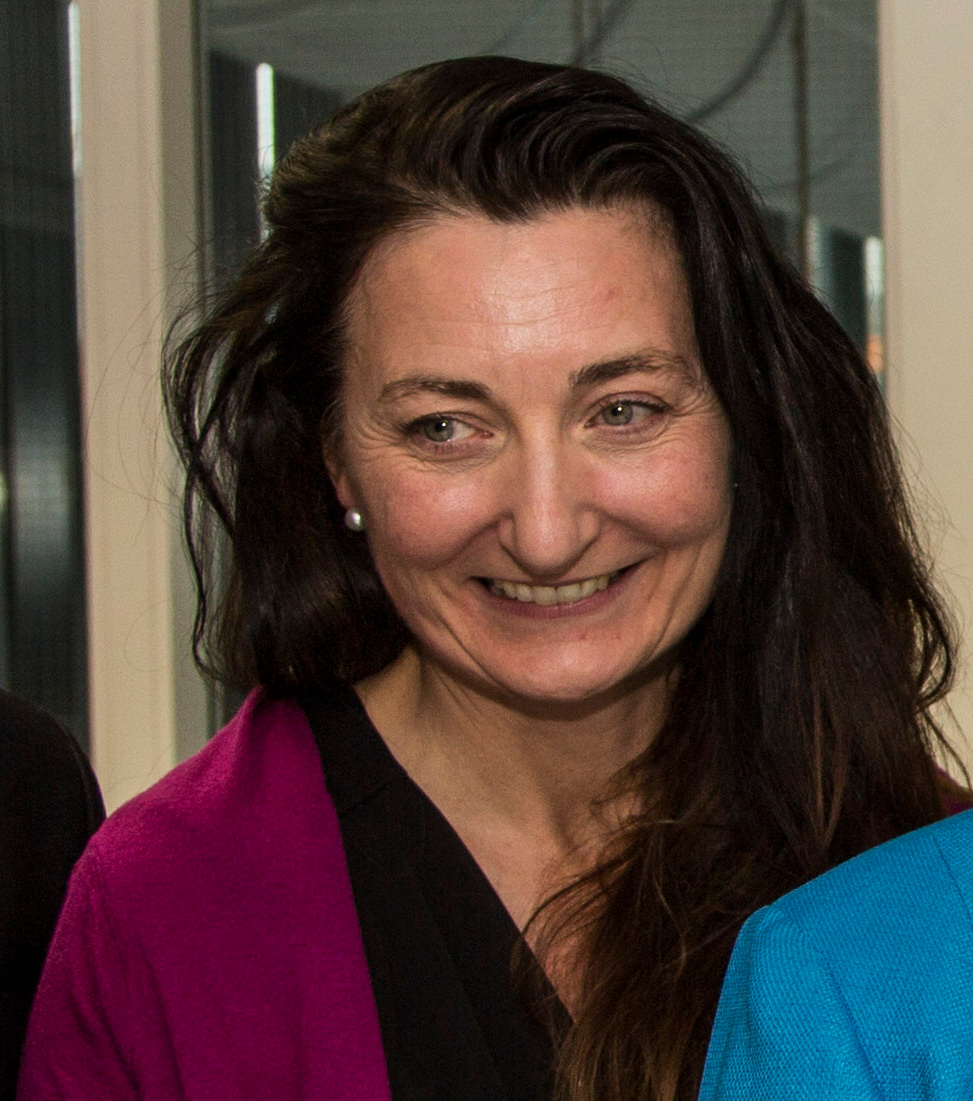
M. Moser

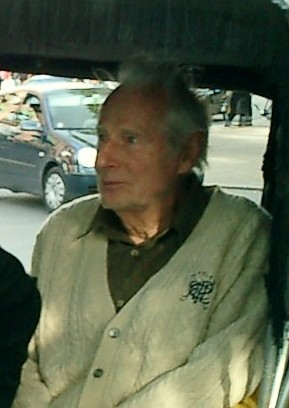
Næss

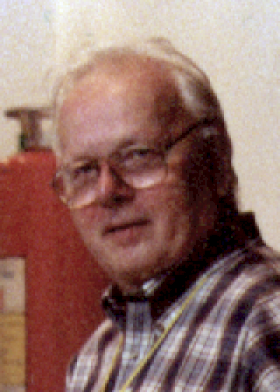
Nygaard

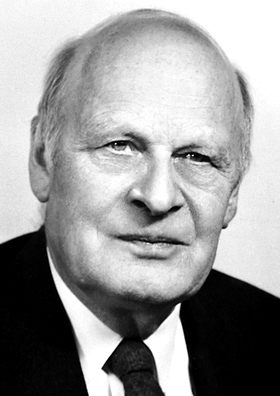
Onsager

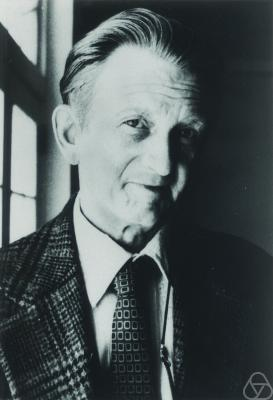
Selberg

== Sports ==
- Finn Aamodt, former head coach of the Norwegian alpine skiing team
- Kjetil André Aamodt, alpine ski racer
- Ragnhild Aamodt, handball player
- Th. Valentin Aass, sailor
- Roald Aas, speed skater
- Thomas Alsgaard, cross-country skier
- Alf Andersen, ski jumper
- Frode Andresen, biathlete and cross-country skier
- Hjalmar Andersen, speed skater
- Gunn Margit Andreassen, biathlete
- Johan Anker, sailor
- Berit Aunli, cross-country skier
- Eirik Bakke, footballer
- Ivar Ballangrud, speed skater
- Anders Bardal, ski jumper
- Henning Berg, footballer
- Lars Berger, biathlete
- André Bergdølmo, footballer
- Tora Berger, biathlete
- Hedda Berntsen, skier
- Stig Inge Bjørnebye, footballer
- Ole Einar Bjørndalen, biathlete and coach
- Kristian Bjørnsen, handball player
- Marit Bjørgen, cross-country skier
- Anette Bøe, cross-country skier
- Håvard Bøkko, speed skater
- Lars Bohinen, footballer
- Audun Boysen, middle distance runner
- Oddvar Brå, cross-country skier
- Rune Bratseth, footballer
- Espen Bredesen, ski jumper
- Hans Petter Buraas, alpine skier
- Tony Capaldi, footballer
- Magnus Carlsen, chess grandmaster
- Linda Cerup-Simonsen, sailor
- Egil Danielsen, javelin thrower
- Bjørn Dæhlie, cross-country skier
- Nils Arne Eggen, footballer and football coach
- Toralf Engan, ski jumper
- Stein Eriksen, alpine ski racer
- Frode Estil, cross-country skier
- Bernt Evensen, speed skater
- Johan Remen Evensen, ski jumper
- Maiken Caspersen Falla, cross-country skier
- Jan Åge Fjørtoft, footballer
- Tore André Flo, footballer
- Ivar Formo, cross-county skier
- Daniel Franck, snowboarder
- Stine Brun Kjeldaas, snowboarder
- Torbjørn Falkanger, ski jumper
- Sverre Farstad, speed skater
- Ann Kristin Flatland, biathlete
- Gunn-Rita Dahle Flesjå, mountain biker
- Ole Kristian Furuseth, alpine skier
- Frode Grodås, footballer and coach
- Harald Grønningen, cross-county skier
- Erling Haaland, footballer
- Gunnar Halle, footballer
- Gro Hammerseng-Edin, handball player
- Sverre Ingolf Haugli, speed skater
- Halvard Hanevold, biathlete
- Brede Hangeland, footballer
- Alf Hansen, rower
- Frank Hansen
- Åge Hareide, footballer and coach
- Ola Vigen Hattestad, cross-county skier
- Trine Hattestad, track and field athlete
- Jens Petter Hauge, footballer
- Nina Haver-Løseth, alpine ski racer
- Ada Hegerberg, footballer
- Vegard Heggem, footballer
- Tor Heiestad, shooter
- Albert Helgerud, shooter
- Finn Helgesen, speed skater
- Sonja Henie, figure skater
- Markus Henriksen, footballer
- Tor Arne Hetland, cross-country skier
- Tom Hilde, ski jumper
- Odd-Bjørn Hjelmeset, cross-country skier
- Tom Høgli, footballer
- Petter Hugsted, ski jumper
- Thor Hushovd, road bicycle racer
- Jakob Ingebrigtsen, middle-distance runner
- Odd Iversen, footballer
- Steffen Iversen, footballer
- Anders Jacobsen, ski jumper
- Astrid Uhrenholdt Jacobsen, cross-country skier
- Finn Christian Jagge, alpine skier
- Anne Jahren, cross-county skier
- Kjetil Jansrud, alpine ski racer
- Rune Jarstein, footballer
- Bjørg Eva Jensen, speed skater
- Leif Jenssen, weightlifter
- Knut Johannesen, speed skater
- Stefan Johansen, footballer
- Therese Johaug, cross-country skier
- Erland Johnsen, footballer
- Ronny Johnsen, footballer
- Martin Johnsrud Sundby, cross-country skier
- Jørgen Juve, footballer
- Geir Karlstad, speed skater
- Kristian Kjelling, handball player
- Lasse Kjus, alpine ski racer
- Knut Knudsen, cyclist
- Espen Knutsen, ice hockey player
- Erling Kongshaug, shooter
- Johann Olav Koss, speed skater
- Ingrid Kristiansen. athlete
- Alexander Kristoff, cyclist
- Eirik Kvalfoss, biathlete
- John Larsen, shooter
- Dag Otto Lauritzen, cyclist
- Øyvind Leonhardsen, footballer
- Ole Lilloe-Olsen, shooter
- Roar Ljøkelsøy, ski jumper
- Tom Lund, football coach and player
- Katrine Lunde Haraldsen, handball player
- Kristine Lunde-Borgersen, handball player
- Claus Lundekvam, footballer
- Fred Anton Maier, speed skater
- Andreas Martinsen, ice hockey player
- Oscar Mathisen, speed skater
- Marit Mikkelsplass, cross-country skier
- Magnus Moan, Nordic combined skier
- Per Ivar Moe, speed skater
- Thomas Myhre, footballer
- Erik Mykland, footballer
- Magne Myrmo, cross-county skier
- Torger Nergård, curler
- Leif Kristian Haugen, ski racer
- Roger Nilsen, footballer
- Sara Nordenstam, swimmer
- Håvard Nordtveit, footballer
- Sondre Norheim, skier, pioneer of modern skiing
- Petter Northug, cross-country skier
- Katja Nyberg, handball player
- Ørjan Nyland, footballer
- Martin Ødegaard, footballer
- Alexander Dale Oen, swimmer
- Stine Bredal Oftedal, handball player
- Otto Olsen, shooter
- Egil Østenstad, footballer
- Ole Østmo, shooter
- Axel Paulsen, figure skater
- Hilde Gjermundshaug Pedersen, cross-country skier
- Morten Gamst Pedersen, footballer
- Håvard Vad Petersson, curler
- Britt Pettersen, cross-country skier
- Øystein Pettersen, cross-country skier
- Bartosz Piasecki, fencer
- Kjetil Rekdal, footballer
- Linn-Kristin Riegelhuth Koren, handball player
- John Arne Riise, footballer
- Vebjørn Rodal, middle stance athlete
- Willy Røgeberg, shooter
- Bjørn Einar Romøren, ski jumper
- Jon Rønningen, wrestler
- Birger Ruud, ski jumper and alpine skier
- Casper Ruud, tennis
- Sigmund Ruud, ski jumper
- Sander Sagosen, handball player
- Ole Selnæs, footballer
- Bente Skari, cross-country skier
- Per Ciljan Skjelbred, footballer
- Liv Grete Skjelbreid, biathlete
- Kristen Skjeldal, cross-country skier
- Vibeke Skofterud, cross-country skier
- Ståle Solbakken, footballer and coach
- Petter Solberg, rally and rallycross driver
- Ole Gunnar Solskjær, footballer
- Ådne Søndrål, speed skater
- Sten Stensen, speed skater
- Ingvild Stensland, footballer
- Martin Stokken, cross-country skier
- Jan Egil Storholt, speed skater
- Kristin Størmer Steira, cross-country skier
- Sverre Strandli, hammer thrower
- Siren Sundby, sailor
- Christoffer Svae, curler
- Jens Arne Svartedal, cross-county skier
- Emil Hegle Svendsen, biathlete
- Jonas Svensson, footballer
- Aksel Lund Svindal, alpine ski racer
- Magne Thomassen, speed skater
- Patrick Thoresen, ice hockey player
- Andreas Thorkildsen, track and field athlete
- Erik Thorstvedt, footballer
- Ole-Kristian Tollefsen, ice hockey player
- Kari Traa, freestyle skier
- Pål Trulsen, curler
- Olaf Tufte, rower
- Håvard Tvedten, handball player
- Thomas Ulsrud, curler
- Vegard Ulvang, cross-country skier
- Grete Waitz, marathon runner
- Karsten Warholm, athlete
- Bjørn Wirkola, ski jumper
- Mats Zuccarello, ice hockey player
- Kristian Blummenfelt, triathlete
- Gustav Iden, triathlete
- Casper Stornes, triathlete

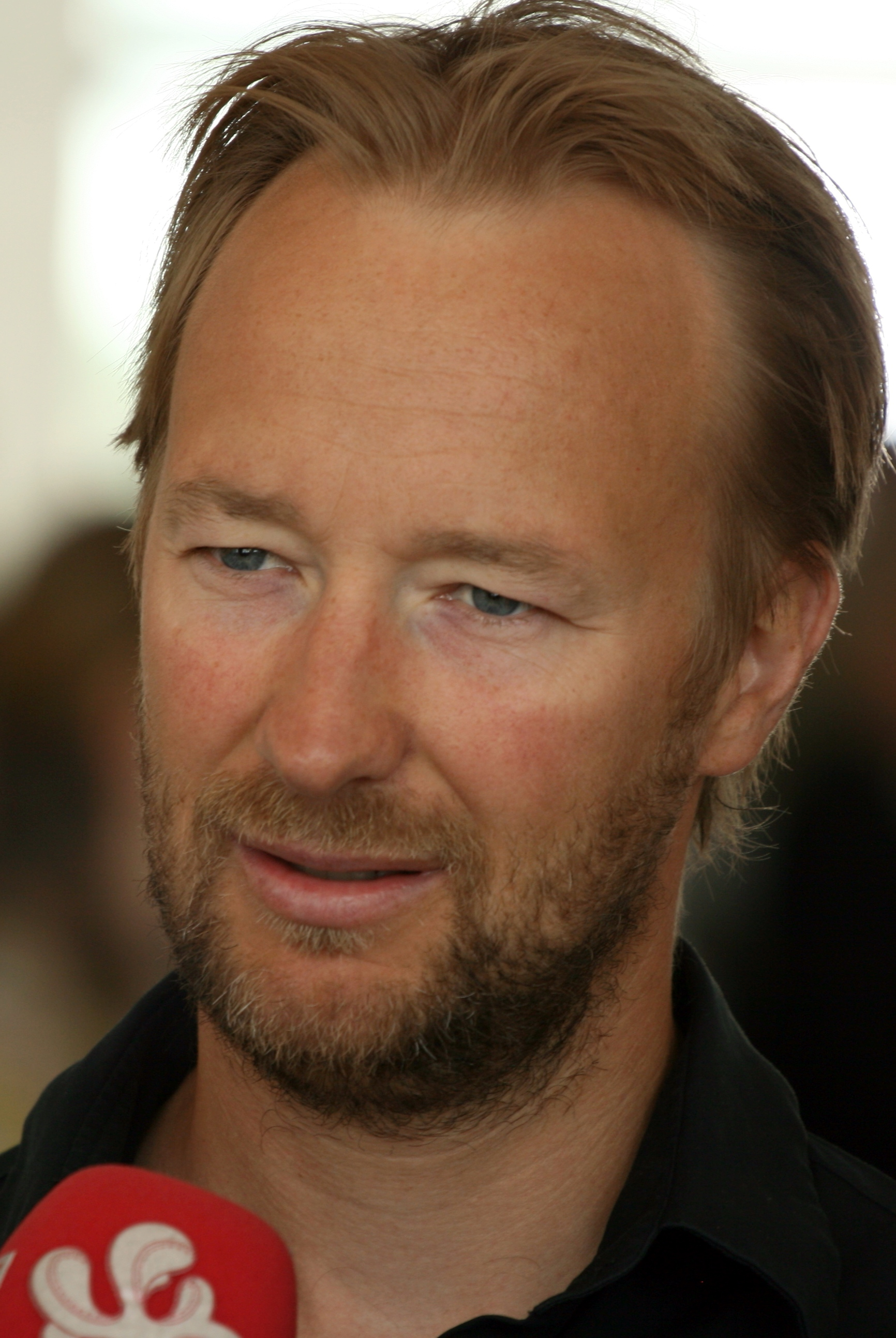
Aamodt

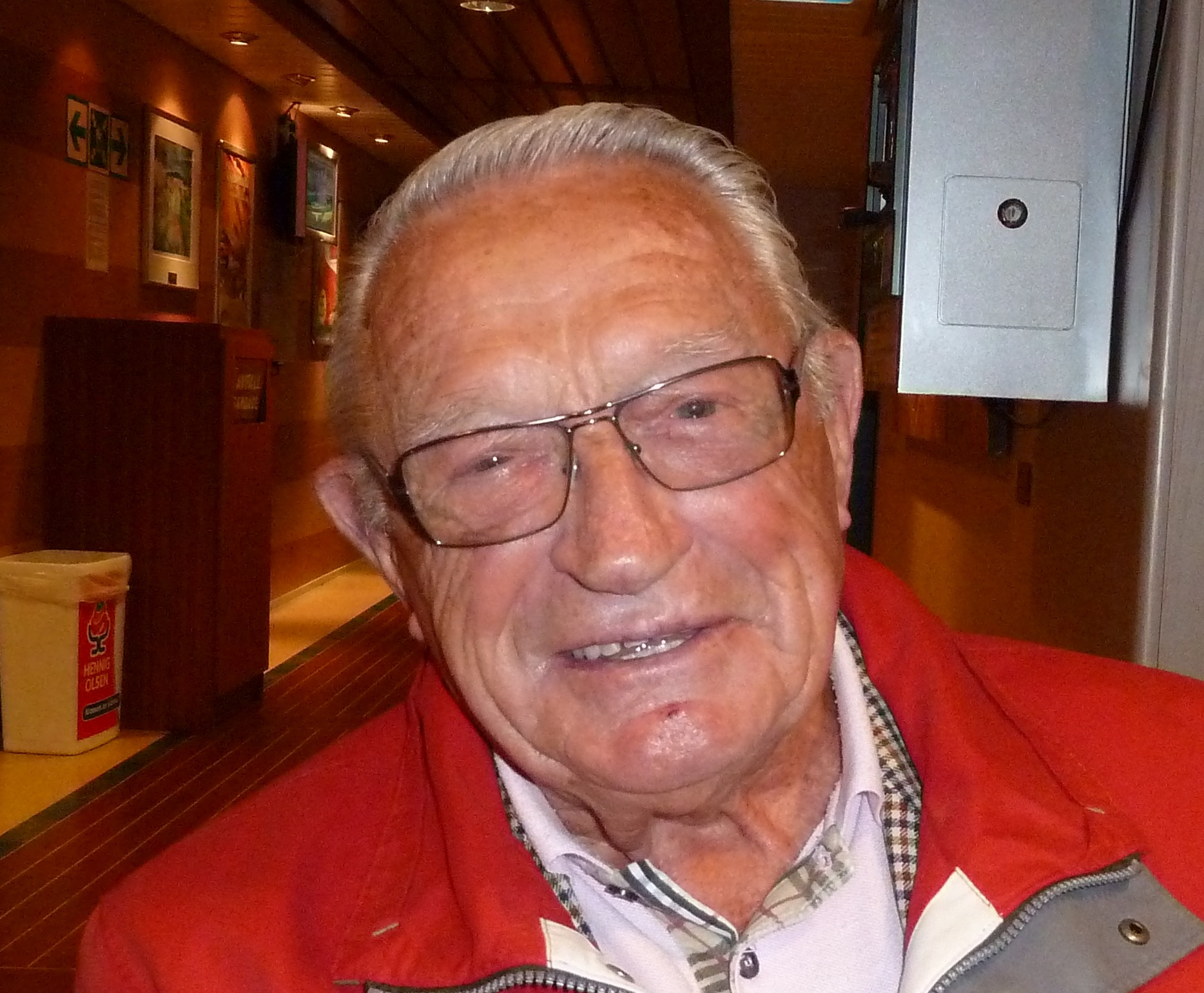
Andersen

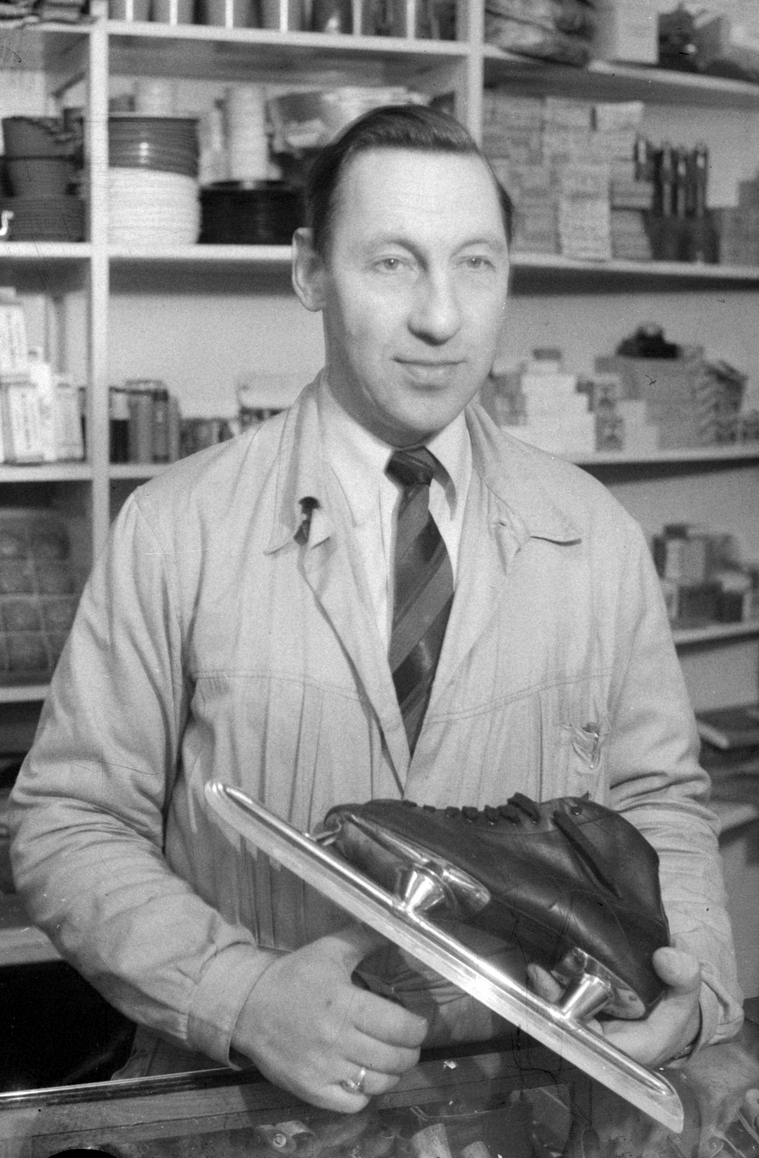
Ballangrud

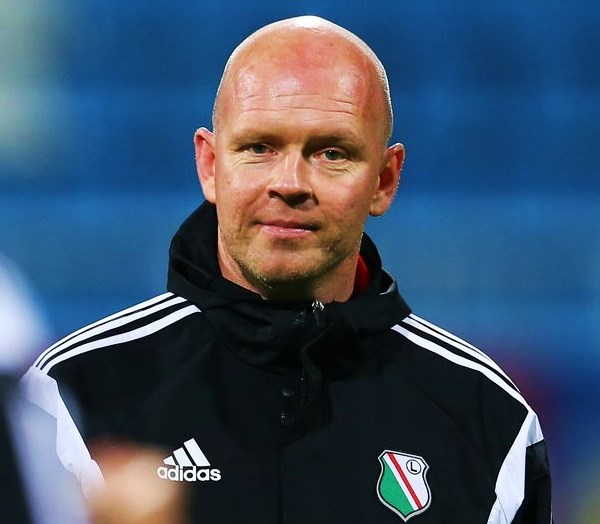
Berg

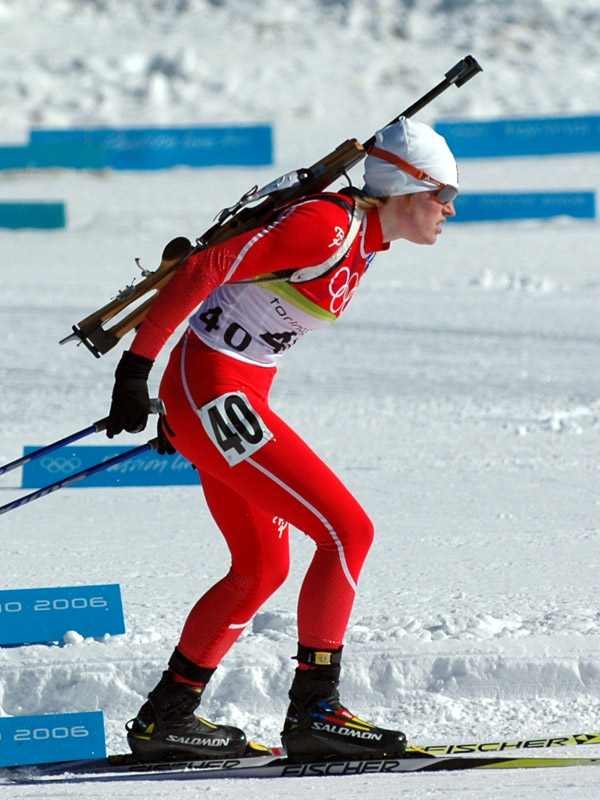
Berger

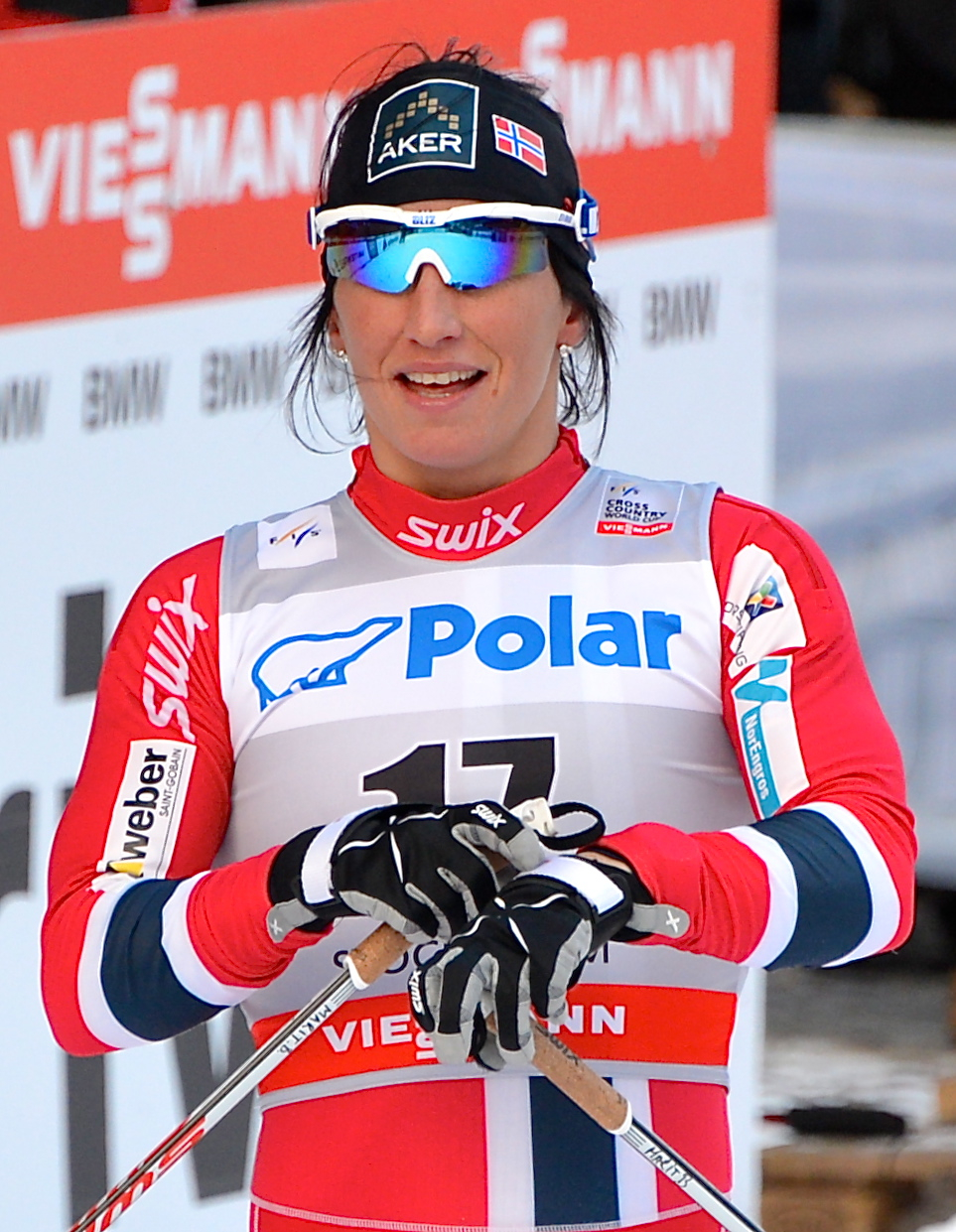
Bjørgen

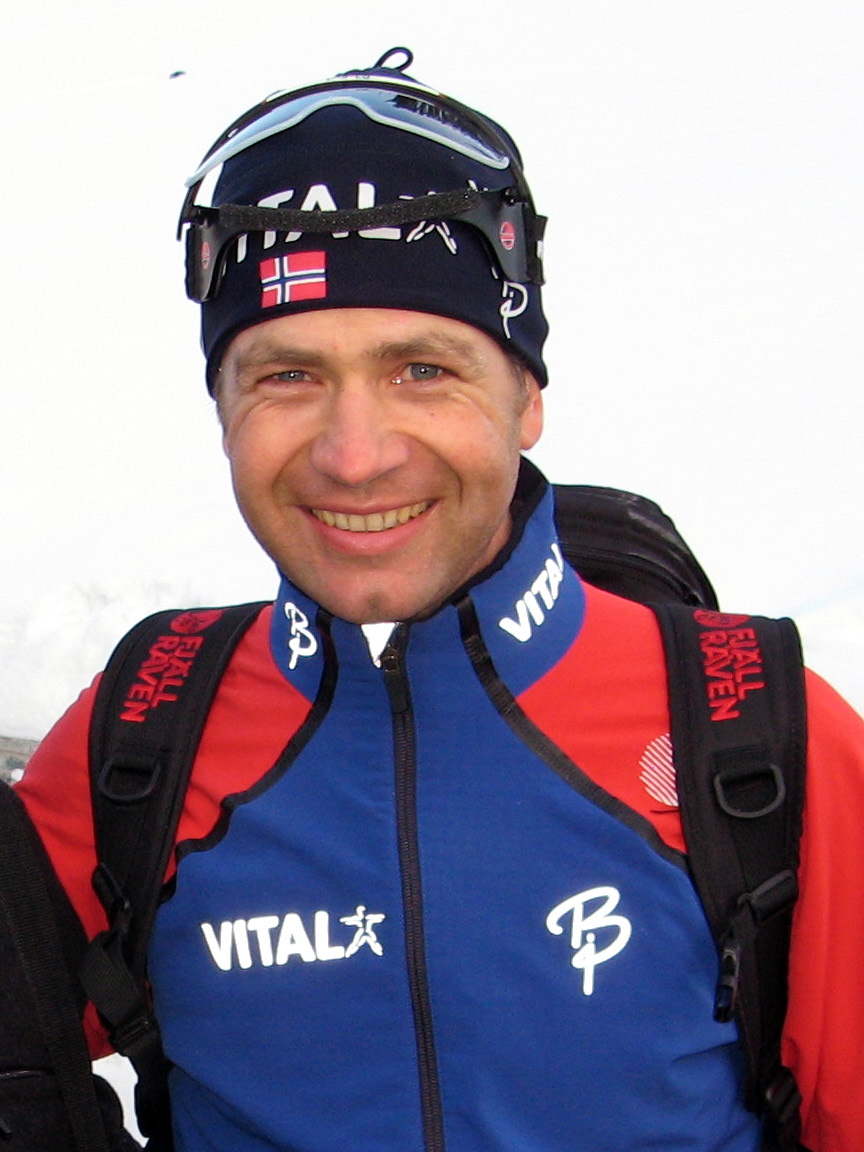
Bjørndalen

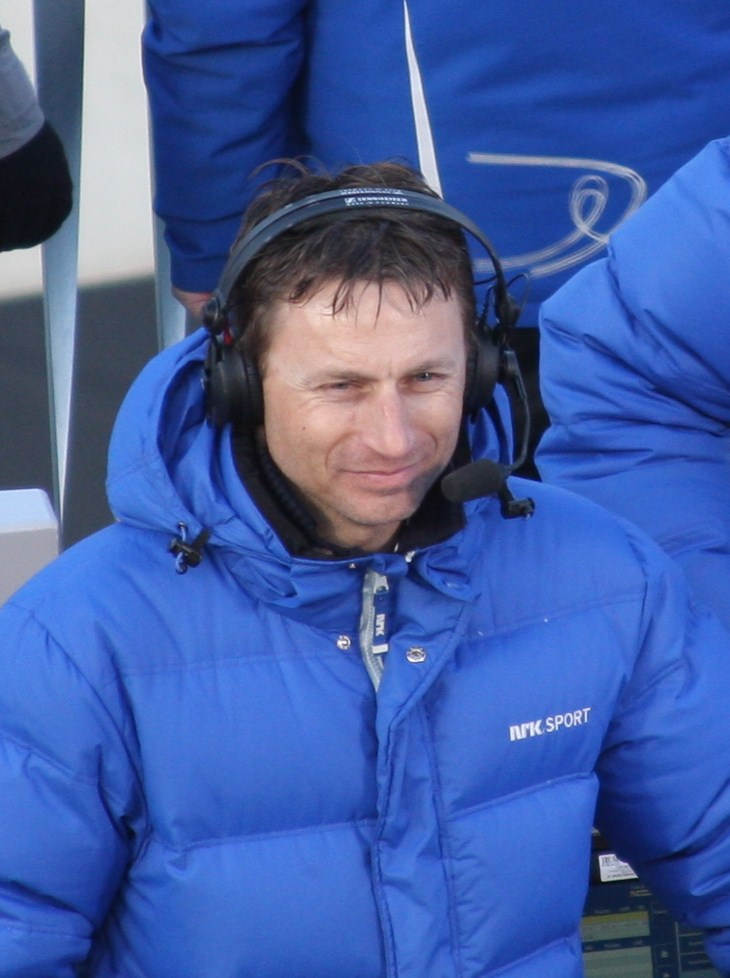
Bredesen

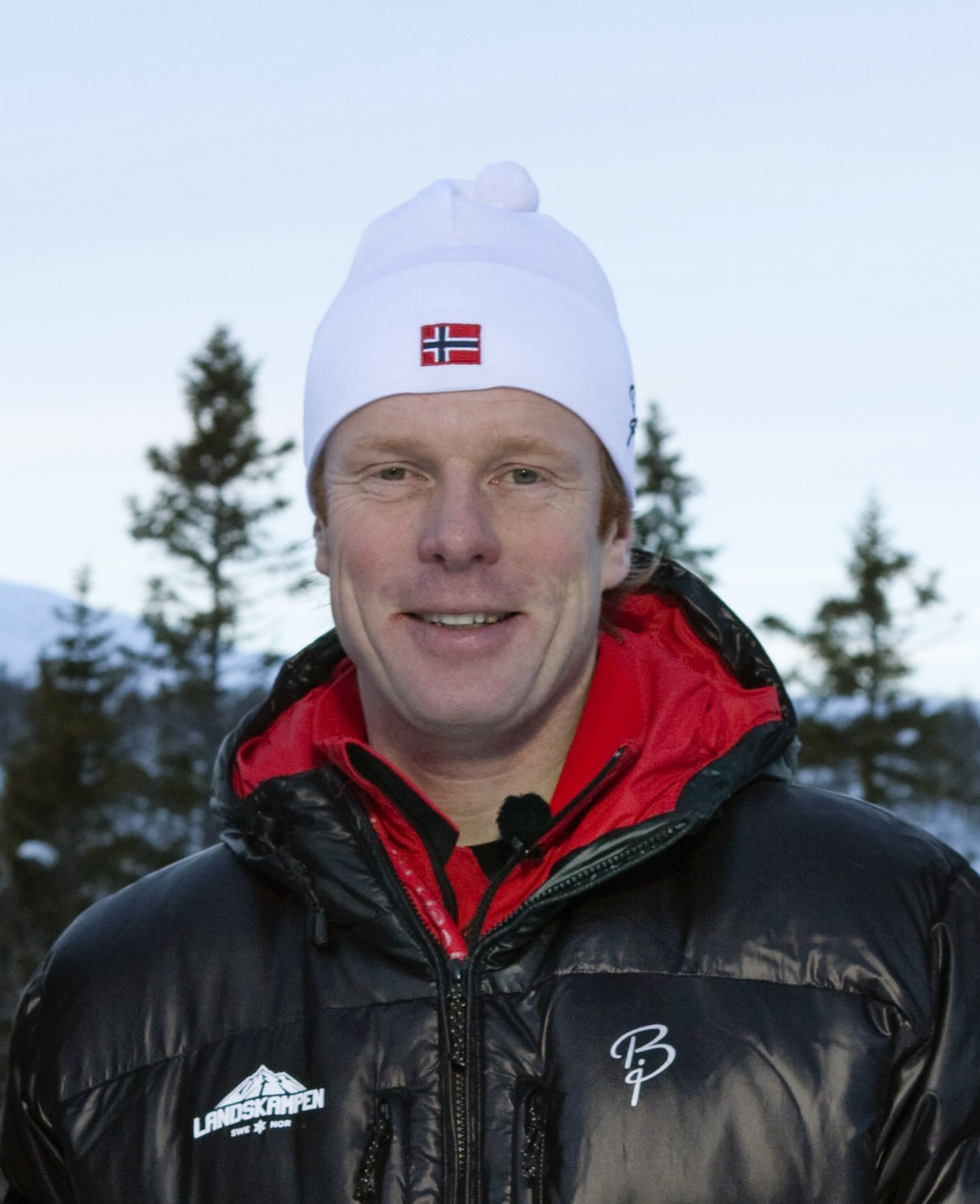
Dæhlie

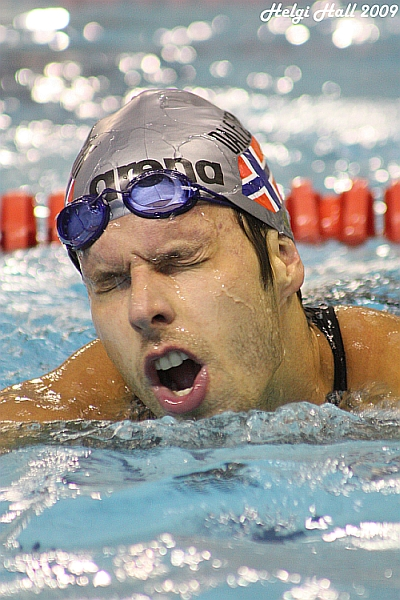
Dale Oen

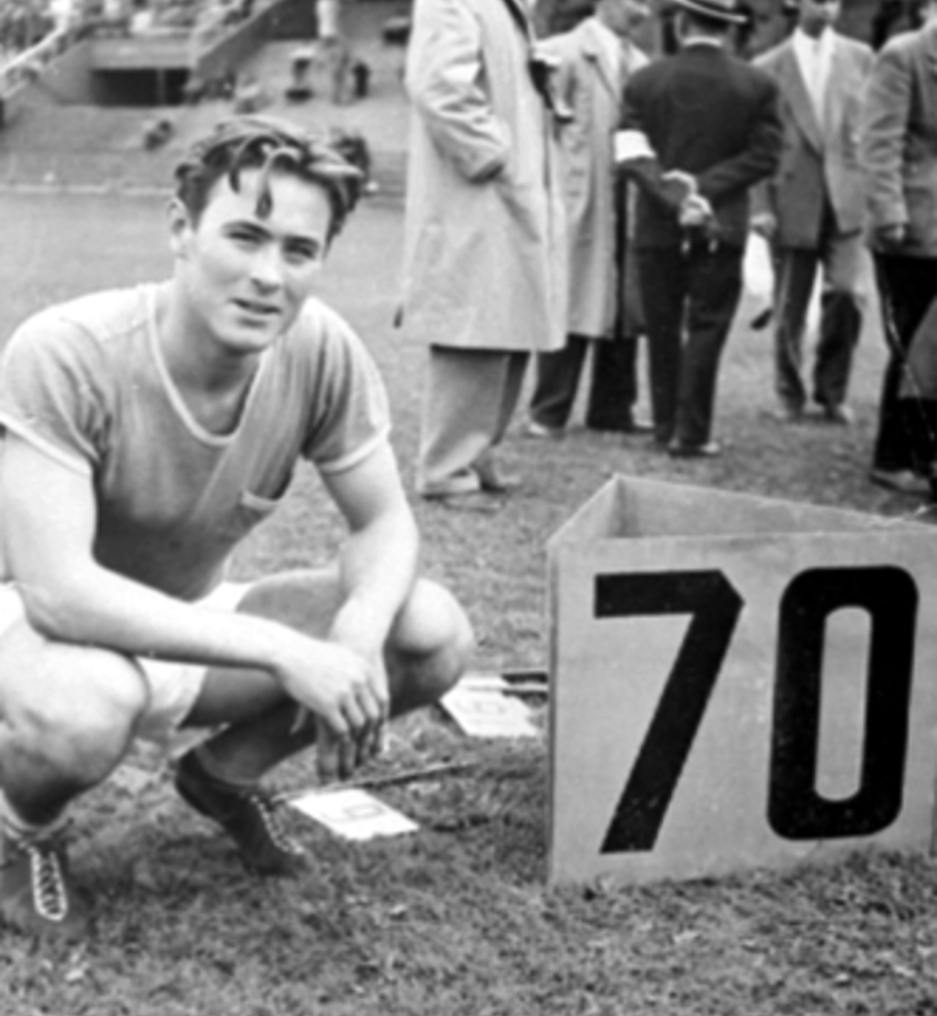
Danielsen

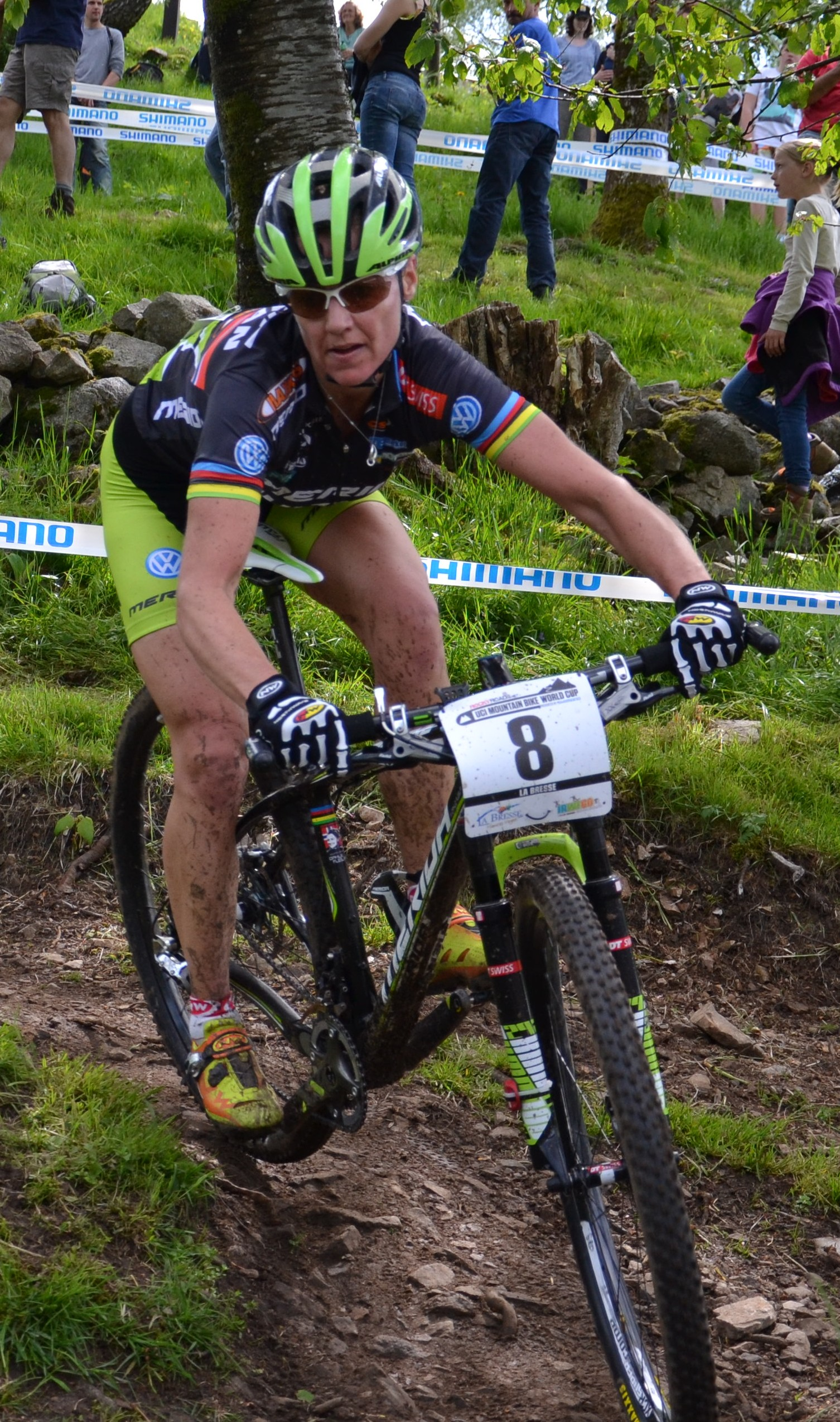
Flesjå

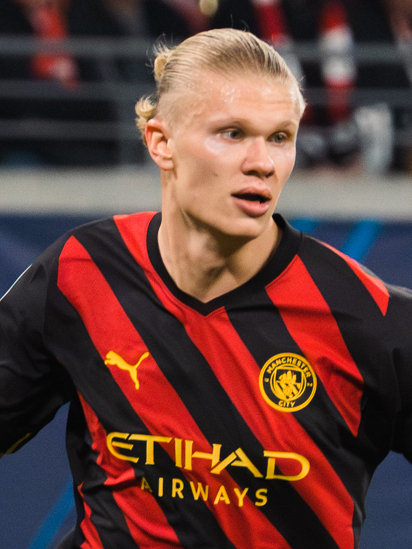
Haaland

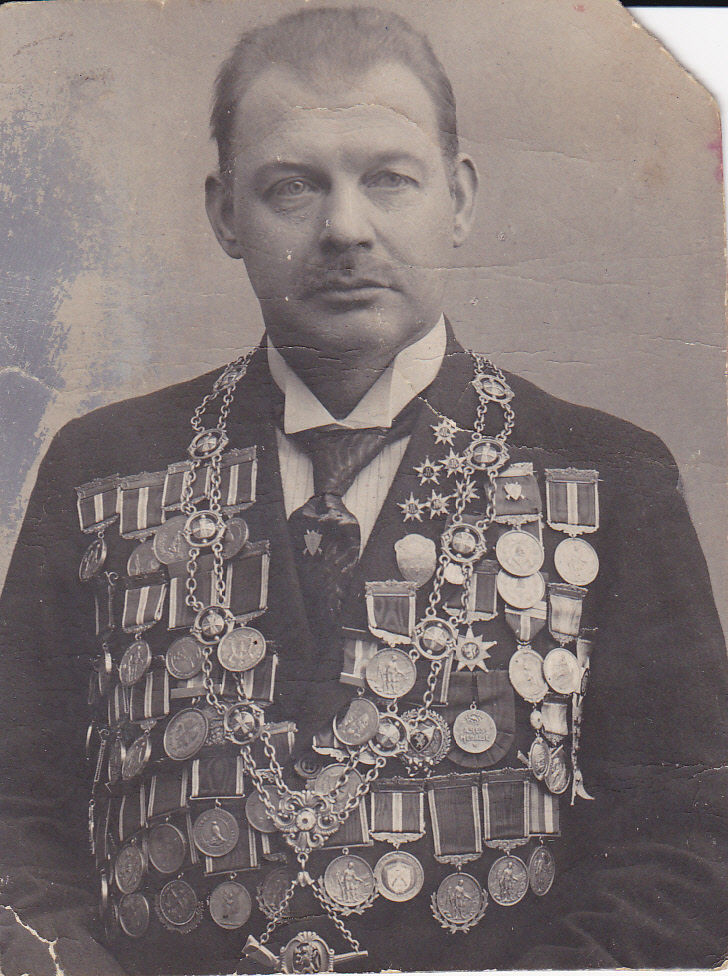
Helgerud

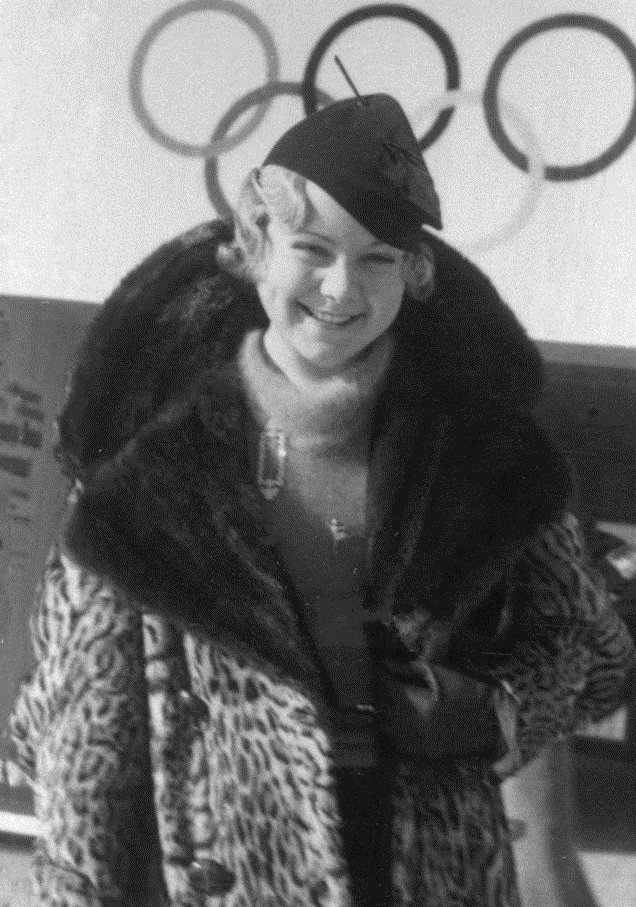
Henie

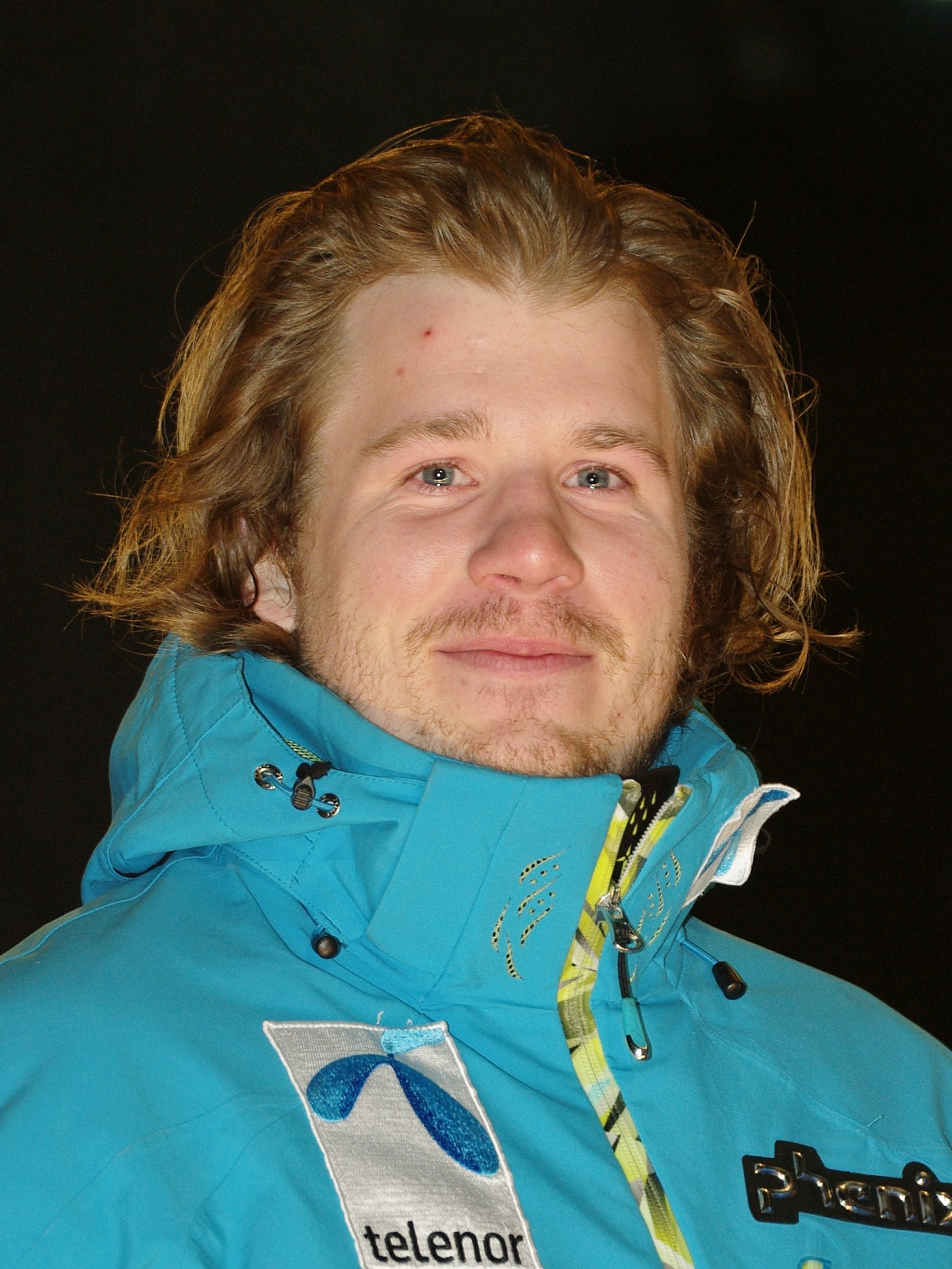
Jansrud

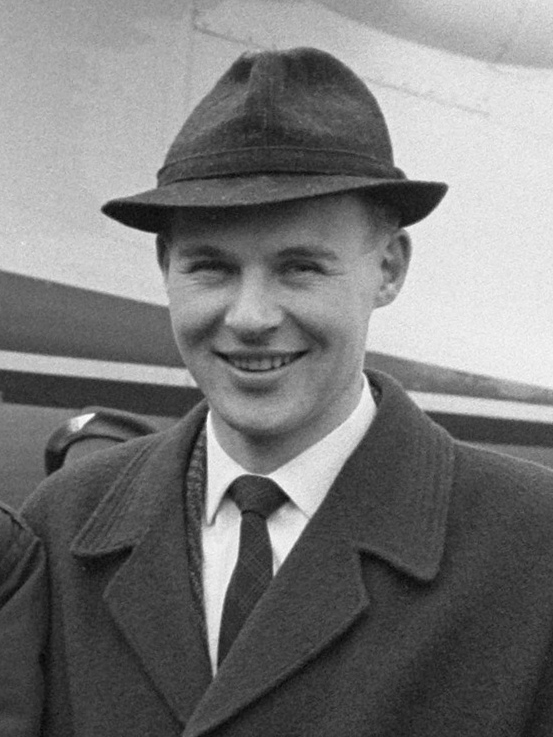
Johannesen

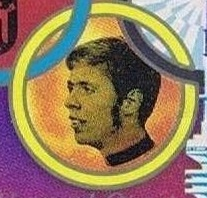
Knudsen

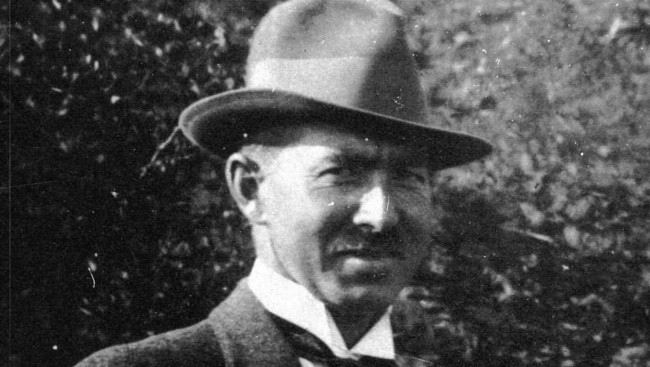
Lilloe-Olsen

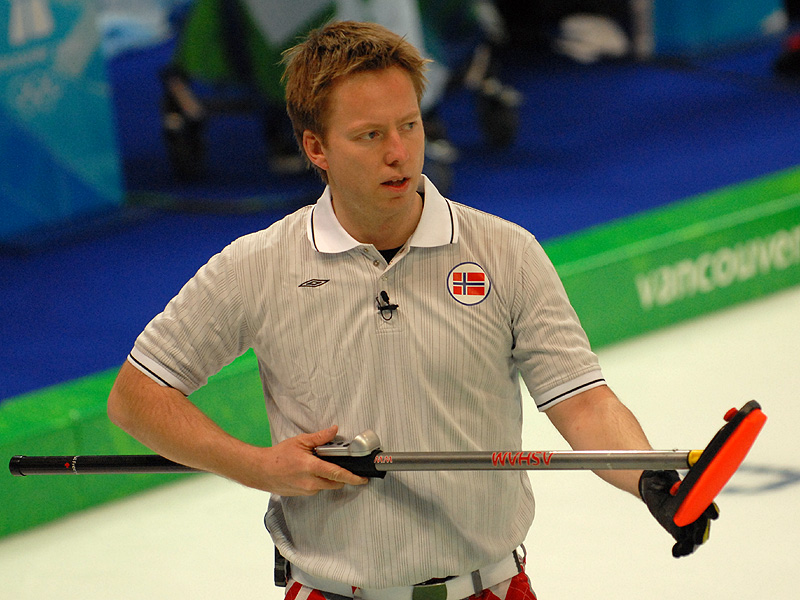
Nergård

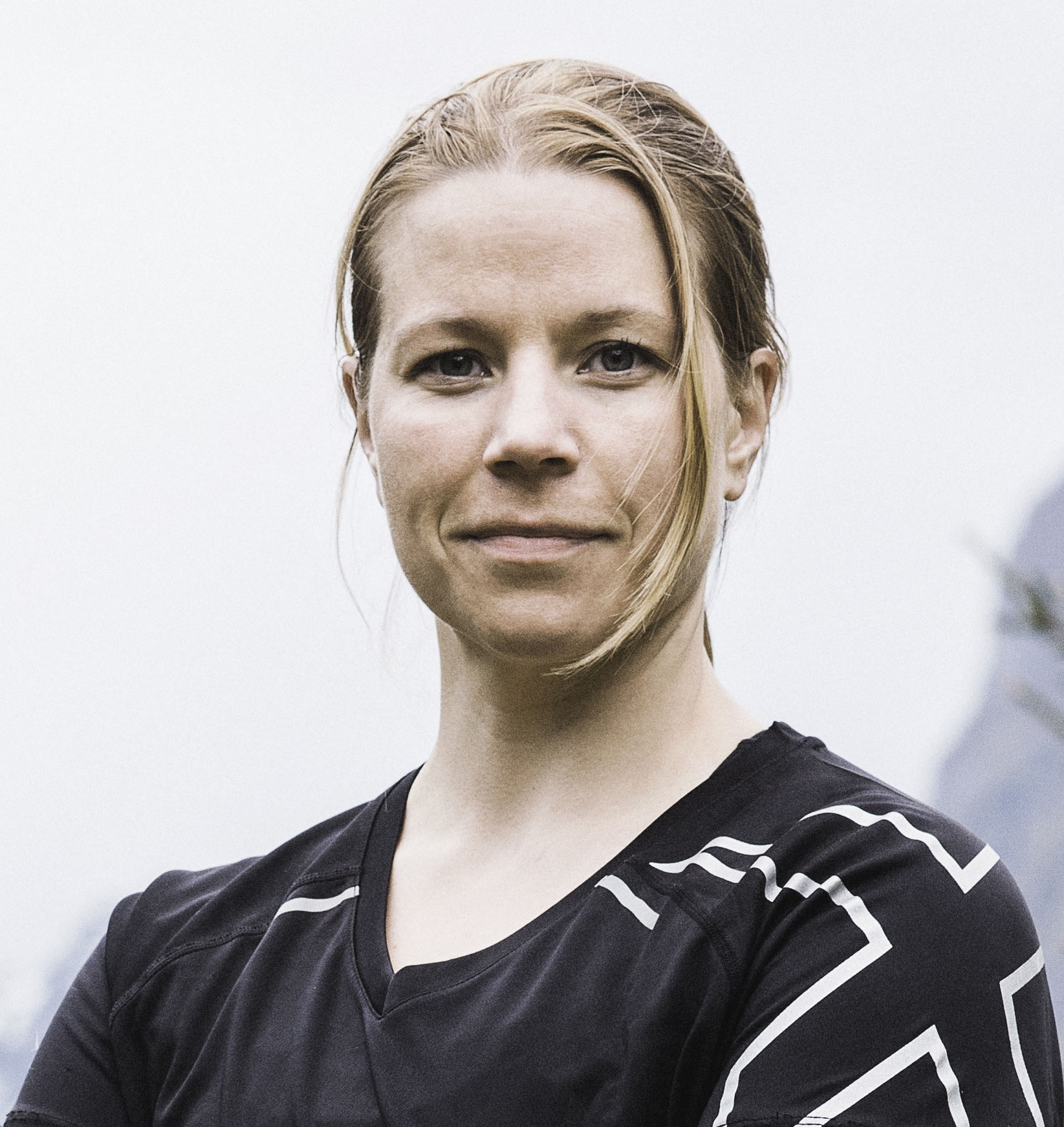
Nordenstam

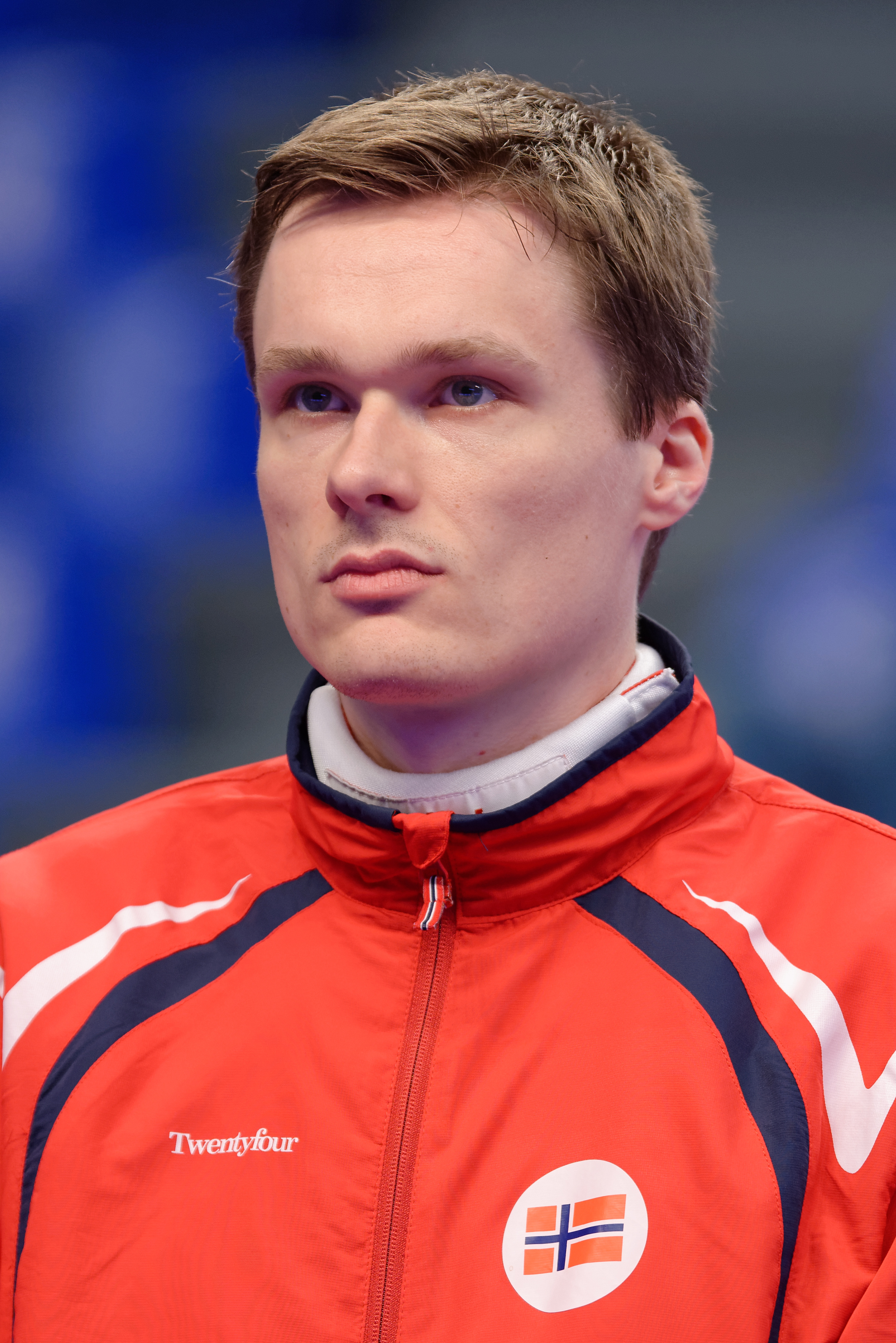
Piasecki

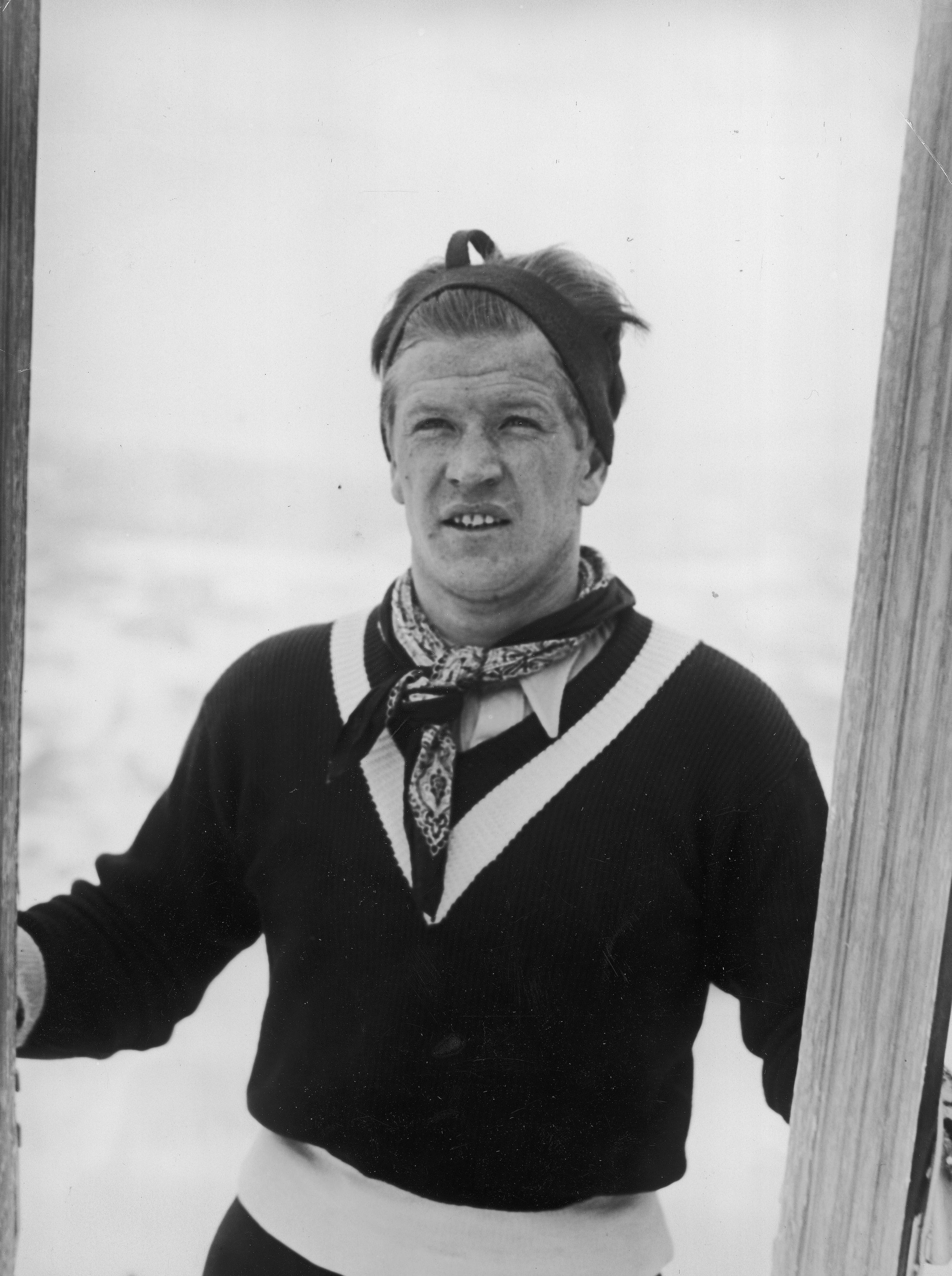
Ruud

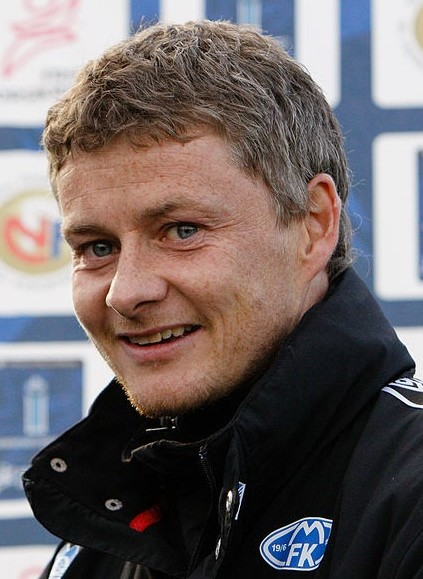
Solskjær

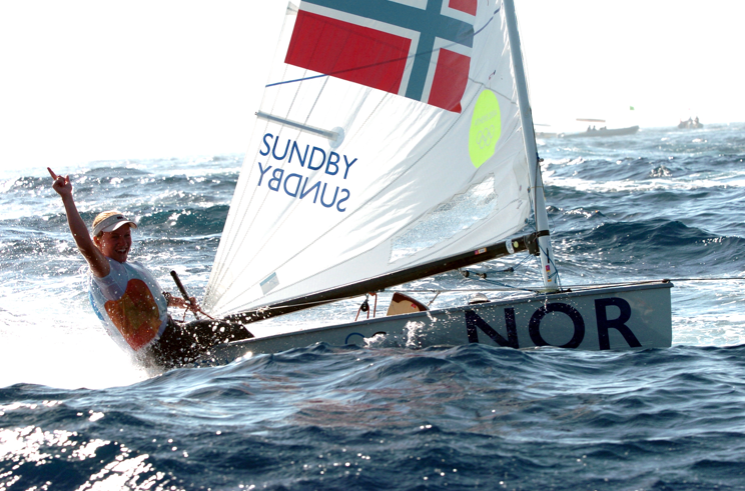
Sundby

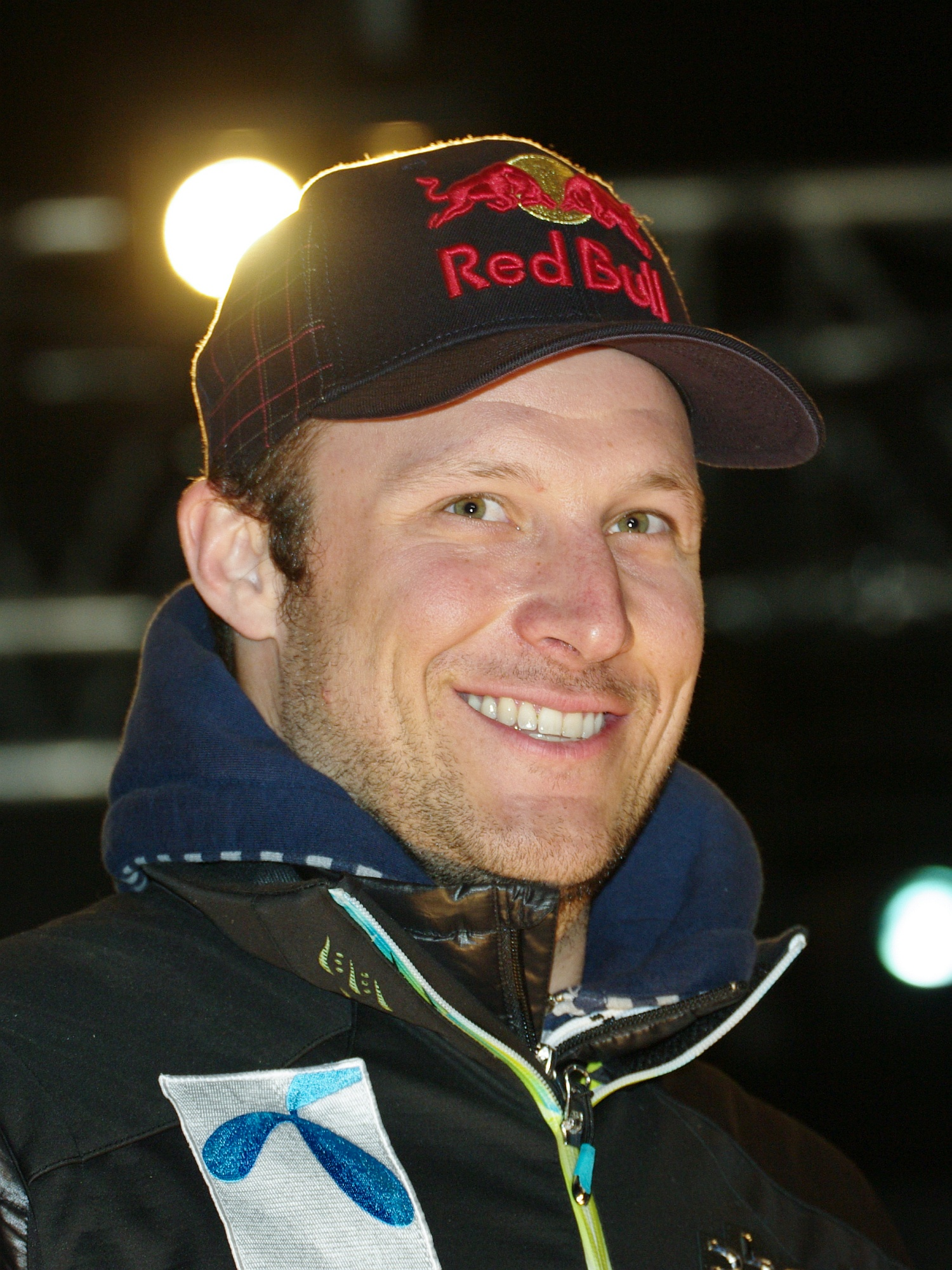
Svindal

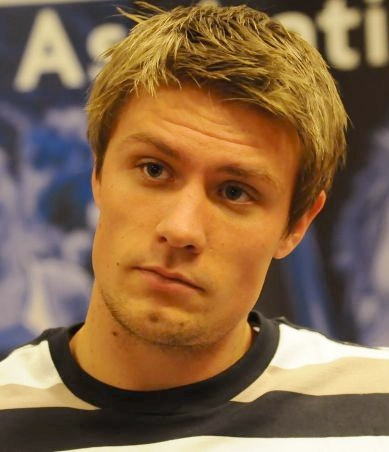
Thorkildsen

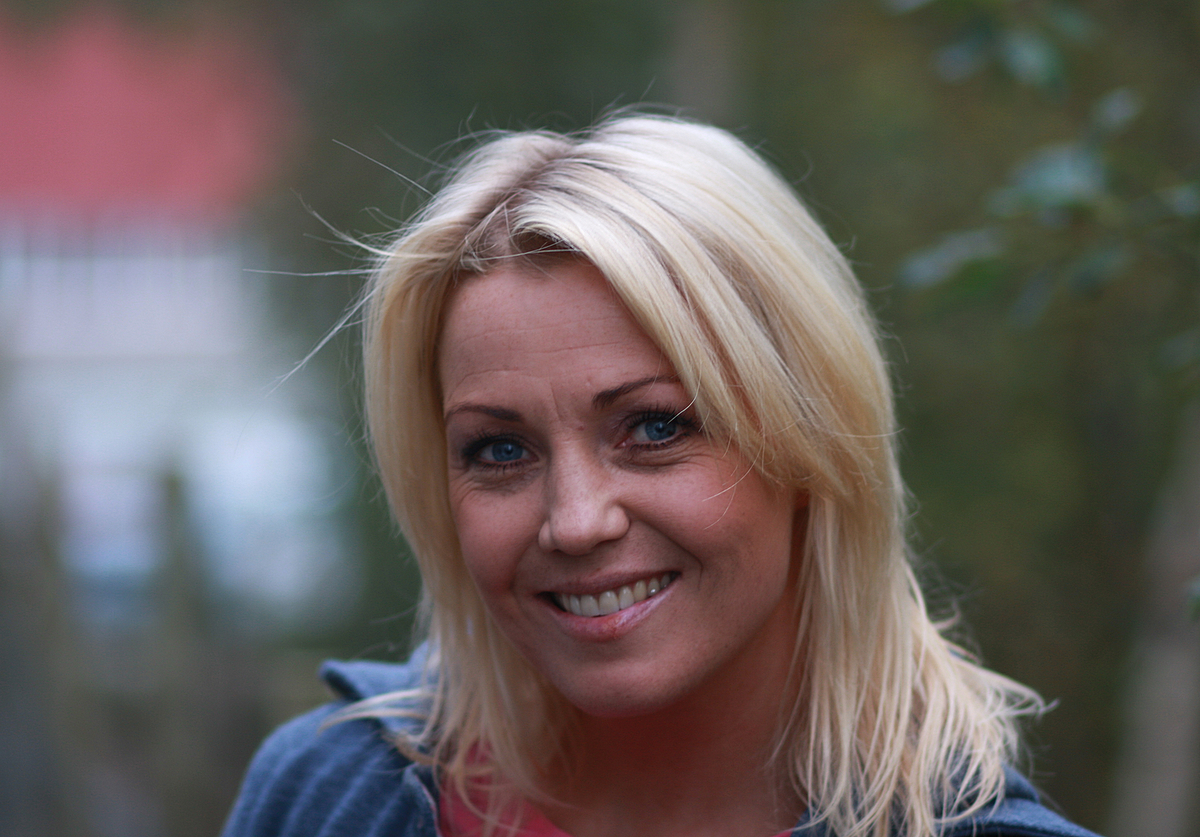
Traa

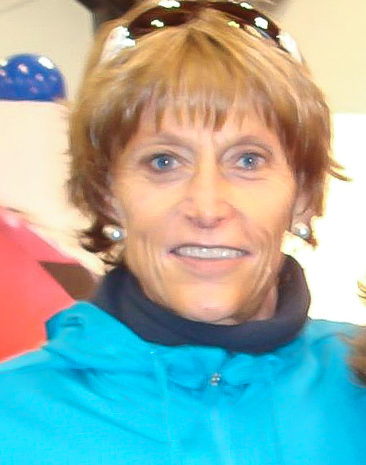
Waitz

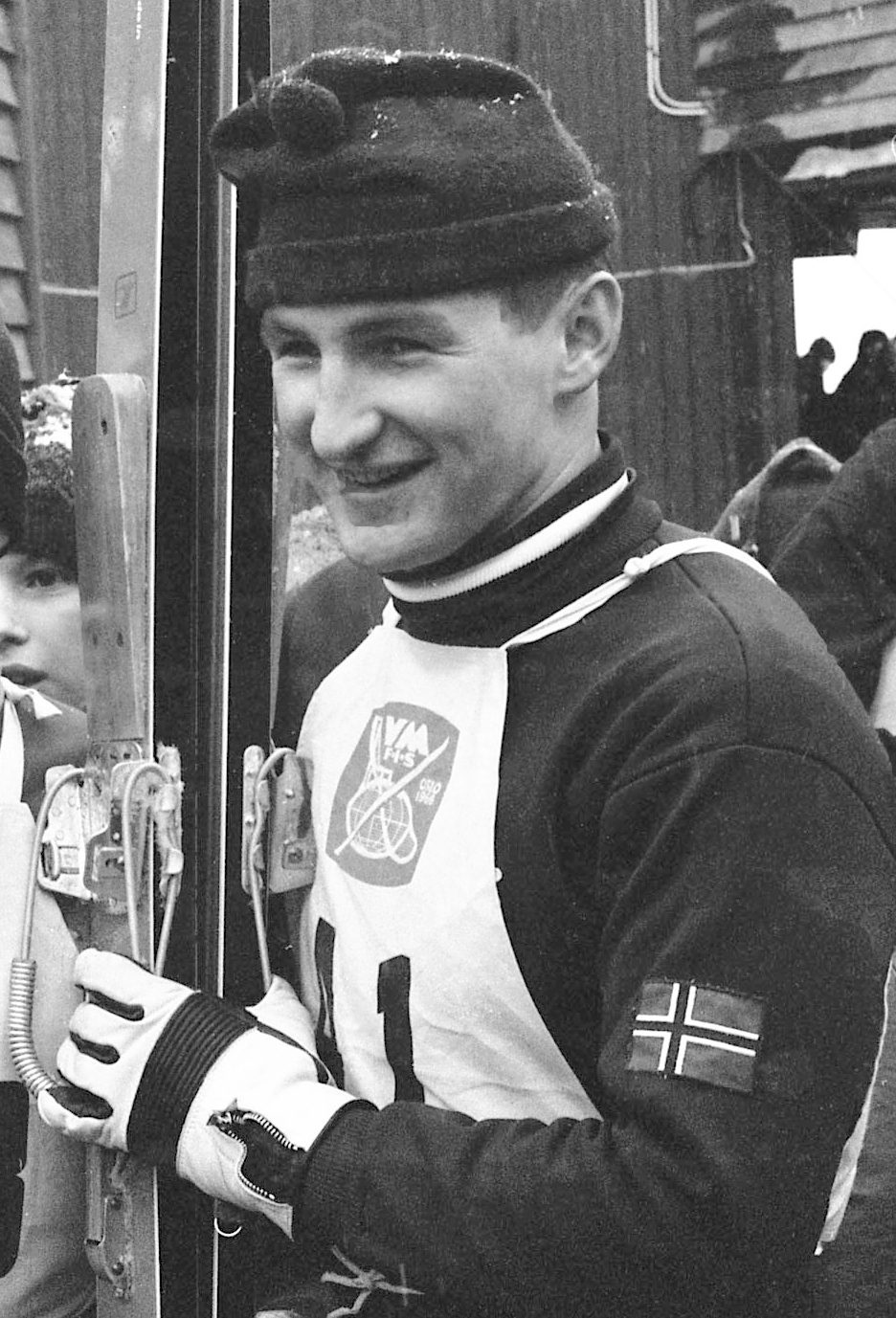
Wirkola

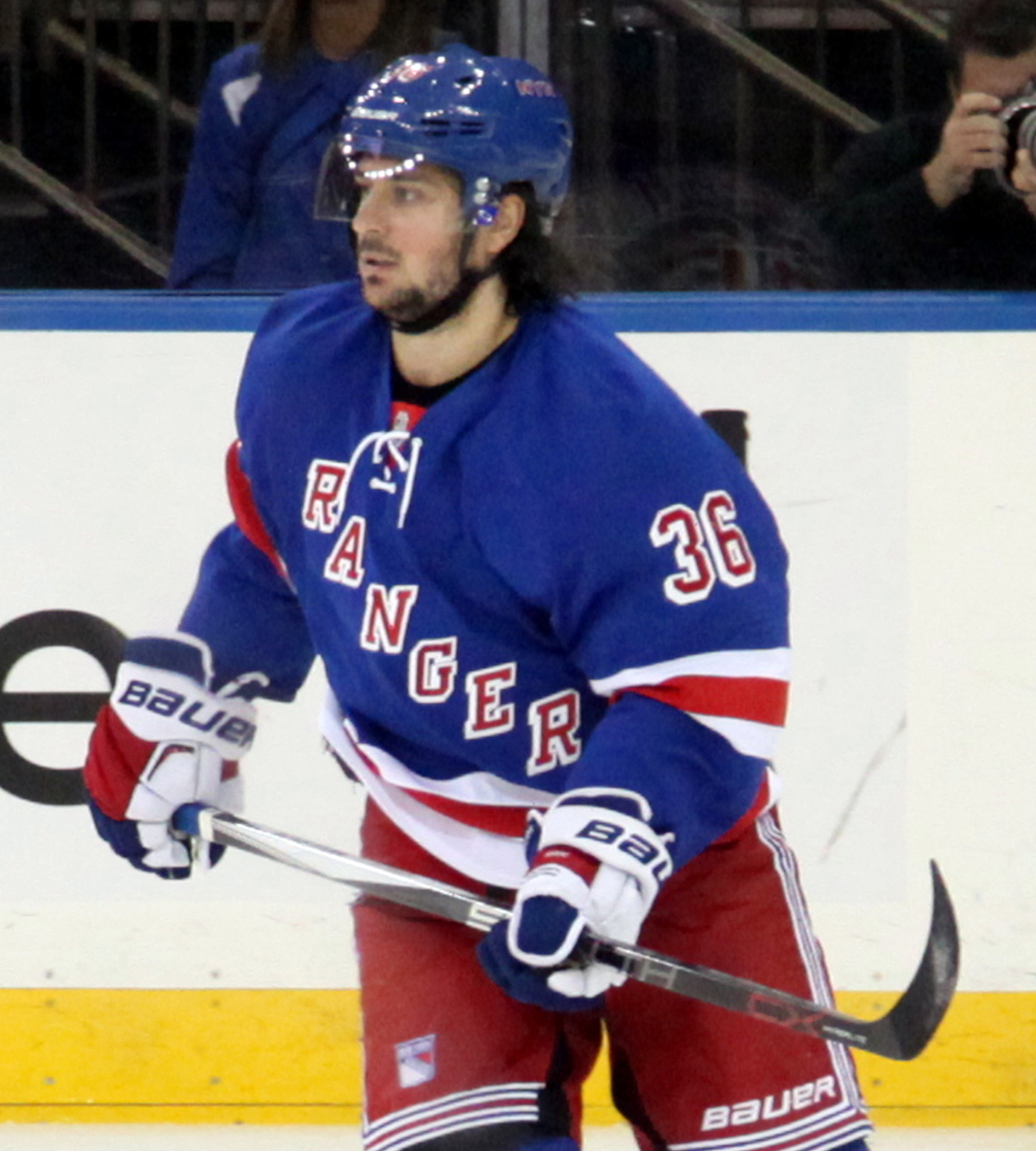
Zuccarello

== Entrepreneurs, inventors, business ==
- Sigval Bergesen d.y., shipping magnate
- Annika Biørnstad (born 1957), media executive
- Thor Bjørklund (1889–1975), inventor of the cheese slicer
- Marianne Heien Blystad (born 1958), lawyer and businesswoman
- Kjerstin Braathen (born 1970), banker, CEO of DNB
- Halfdan Gyth Dehli, businessman and aviator
- Sam Eyde, inventor and industrialist
- John Fredriksen, shipping magnate
- Stein Erik Hagen, businessman
- Siri Hatlen, businessperson
- Per Helmer, businessperson
- Alf Ihlen, industrialist
- Anders Jahre, shipping magnate
- Jørgen Jahre, shipowner
- Jannik Lindbæk, banker
- Tove Kvammen Midelfart (born 1951), lawyer and businesswoman
- Susanne Munch Thore (born 1960), lawyer and businesswoman
- Arne Næss Jr., businessman and mountaineer
- Fred Olsen, shipping magnate
- Margareth Øvrum (born 1958), civil engineer and business executive
- Heidi M. Petersen, businesswoman
- Hilmar Reksten, shipping magnate
- Kjell Inge Røkke, businessman and fisherman
- Peter Arne Ruzicka, businessman
- Julie Skarland (born 1960), fashion designer
- Carl Peter Stoltenberg, merchant and shipowner
- Petter Stordalen, businessman
- Berit Svendsen (born 1963), business executive and engineer
- Anne Carine Tanum (born 1954), business executive
- Olav Thon (1923–2024), real estate developer
- Johan Vaaler (1866–1910)
- Bror With (1900–1985), inventor

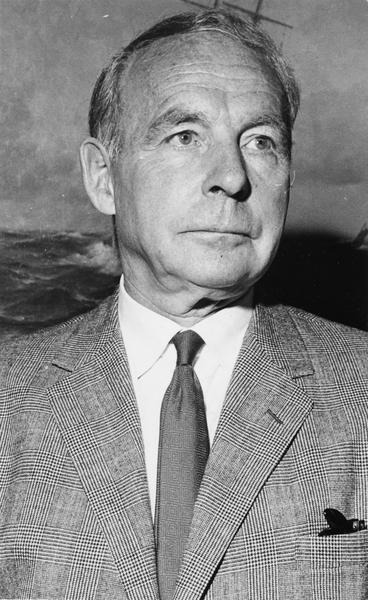
Bergesen

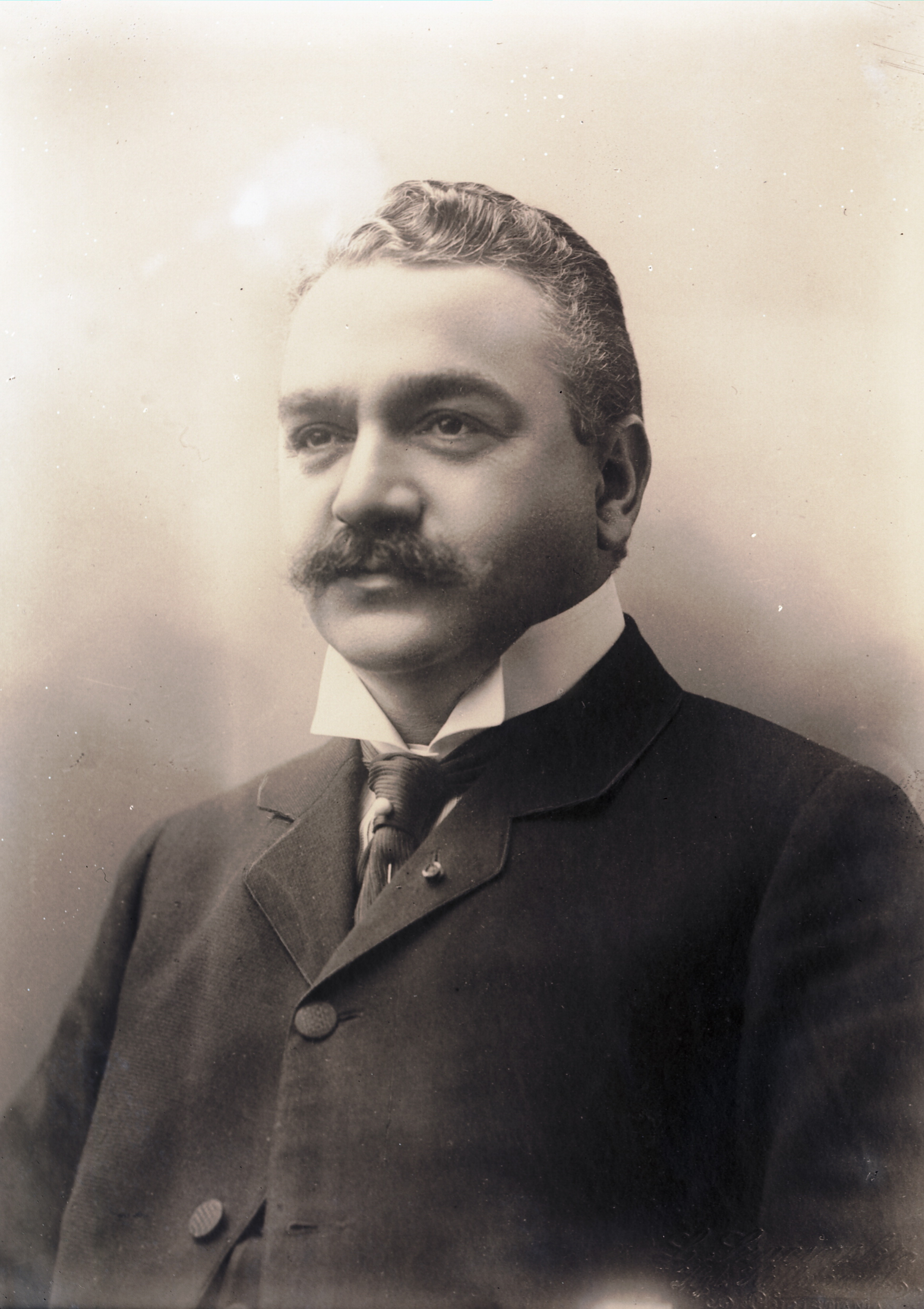
Eyde

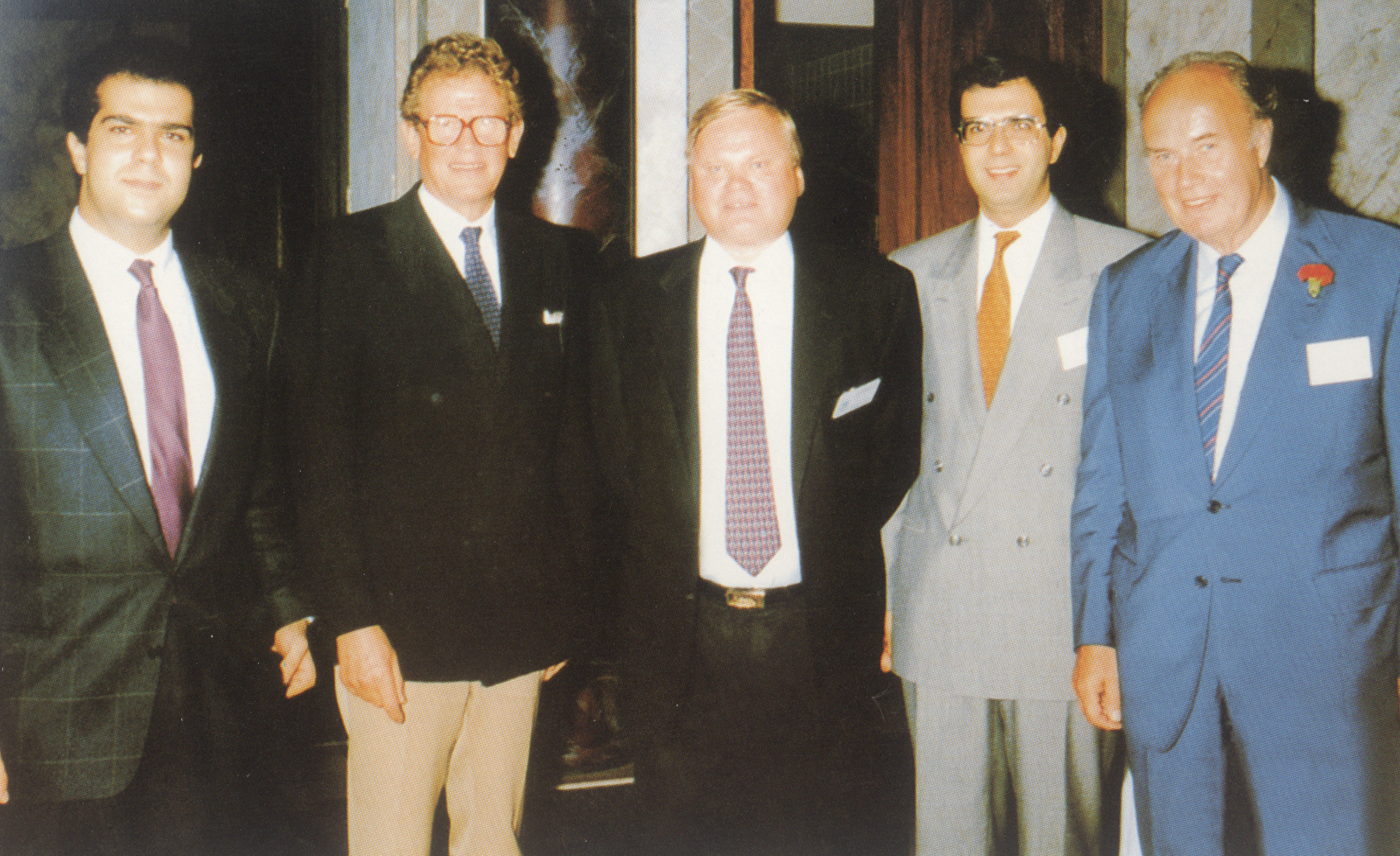
Fredriksen

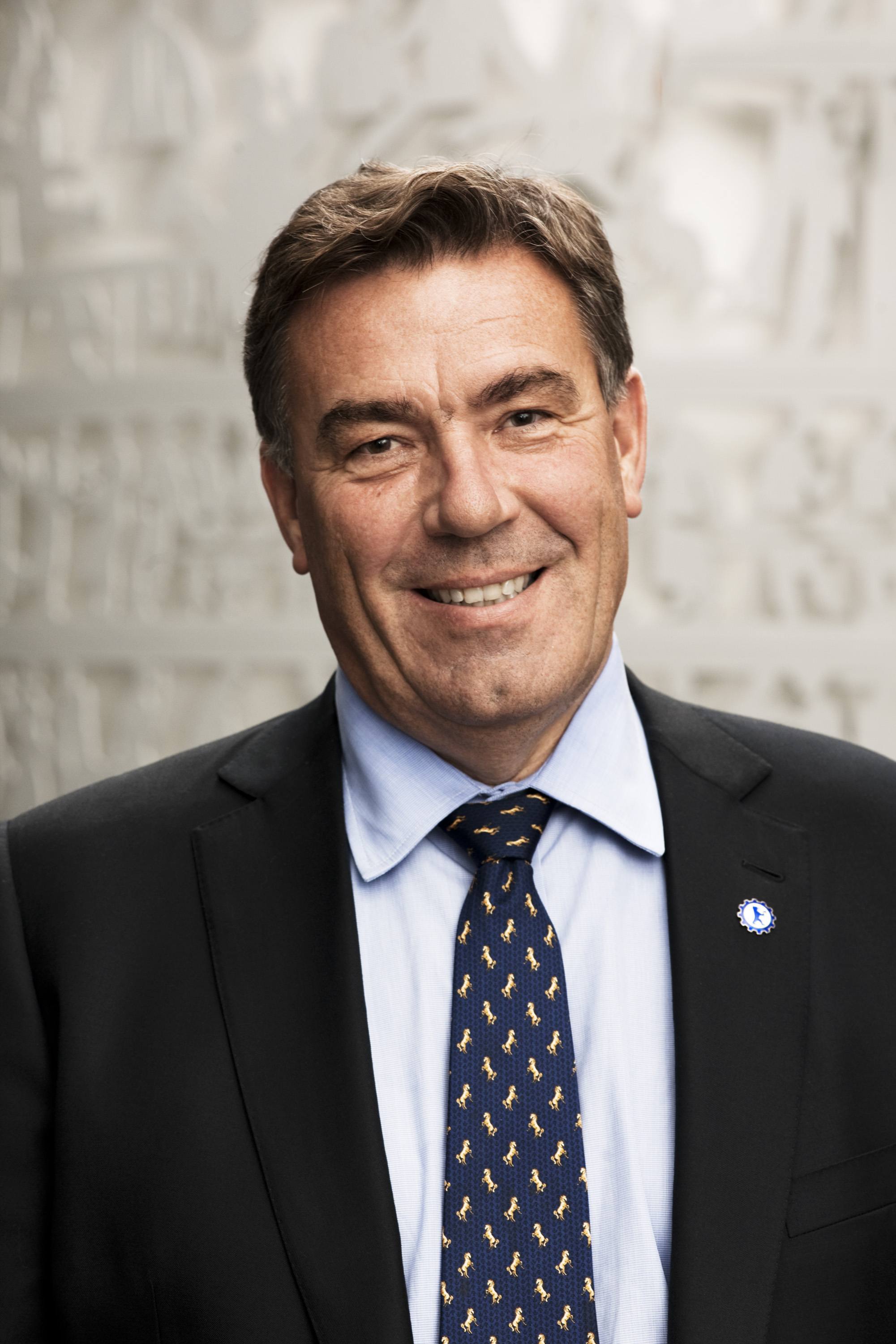
Hagen

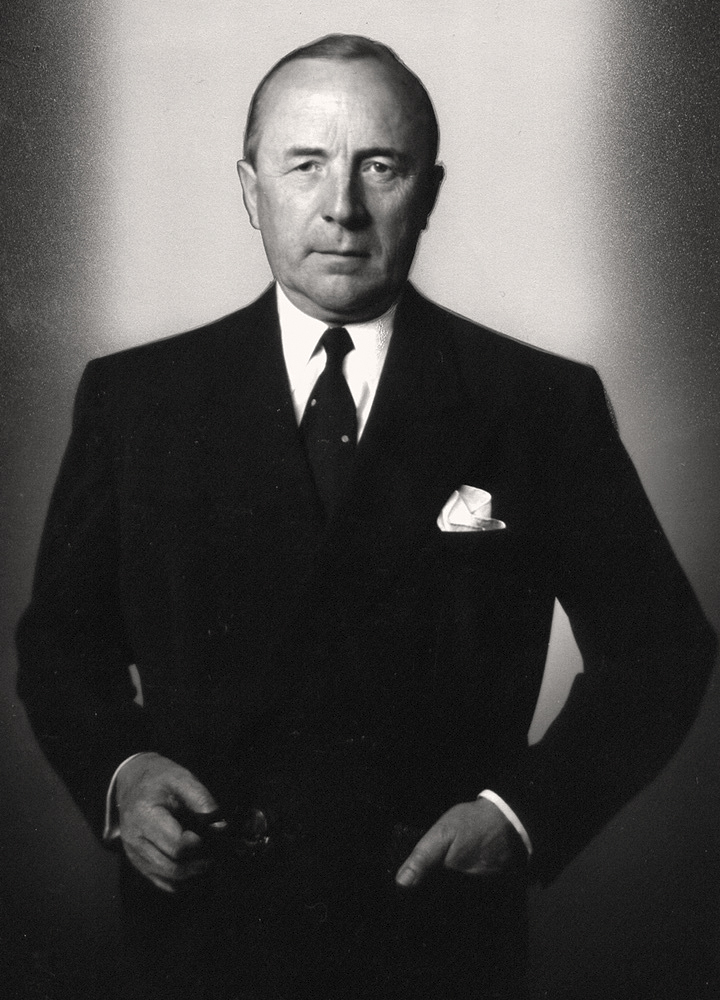
Jahre

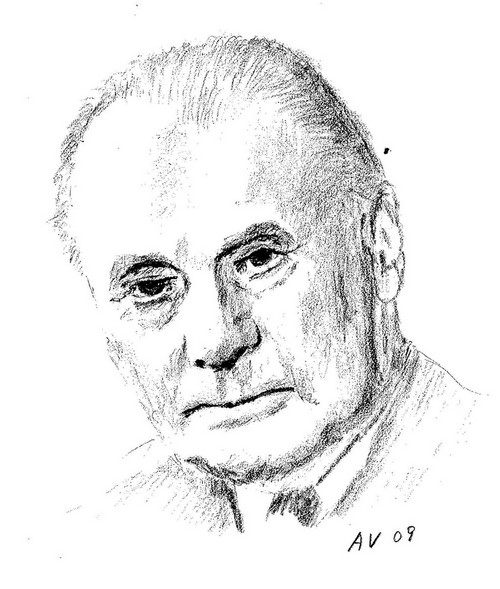
Reksten

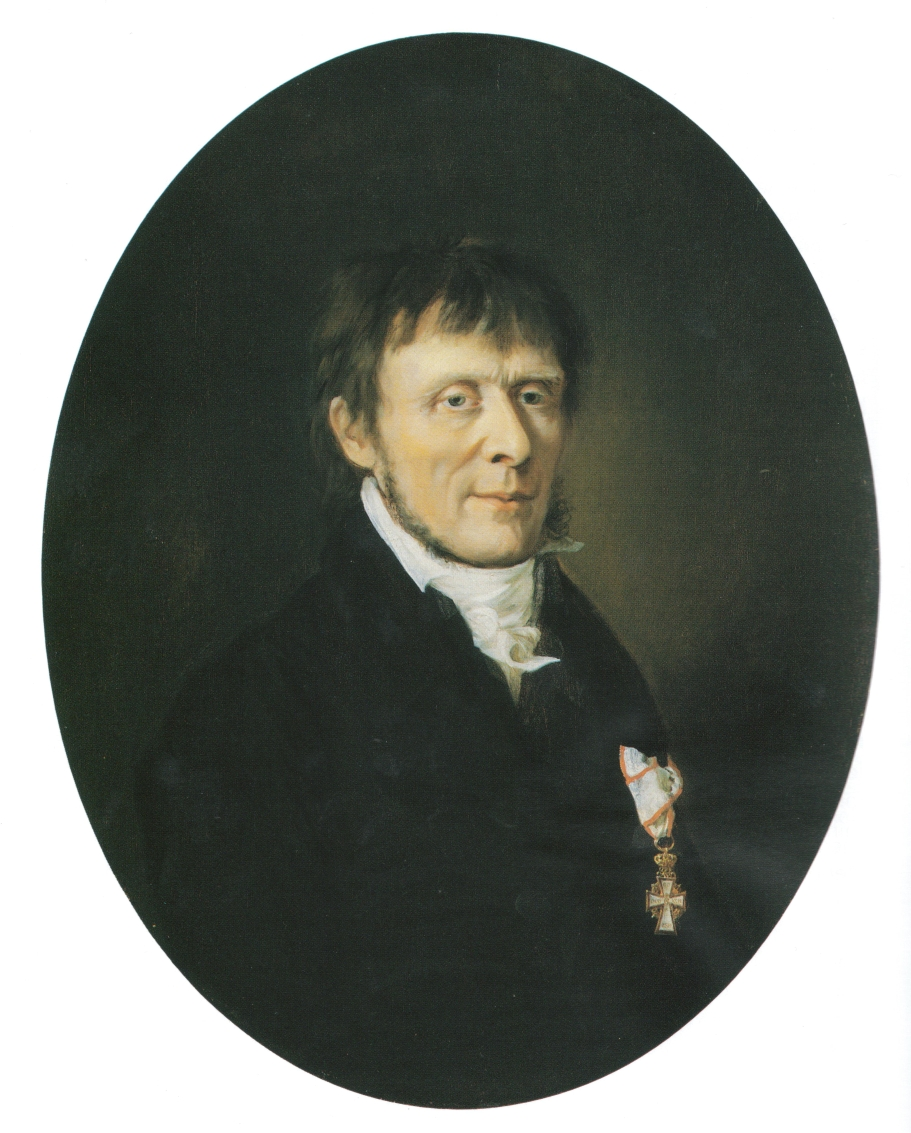
Stoltenberg

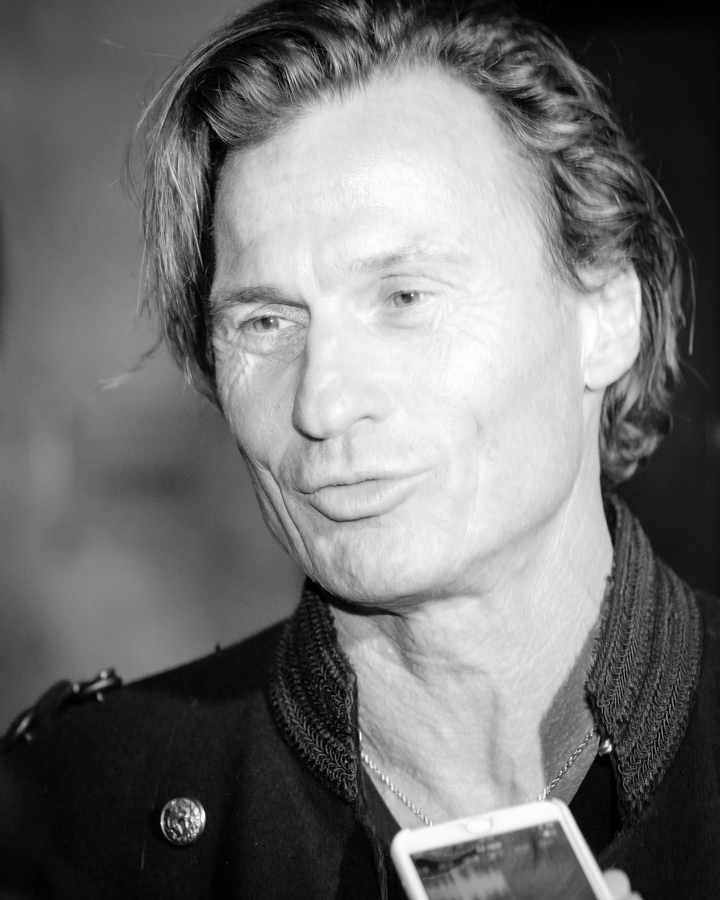
Stordalen

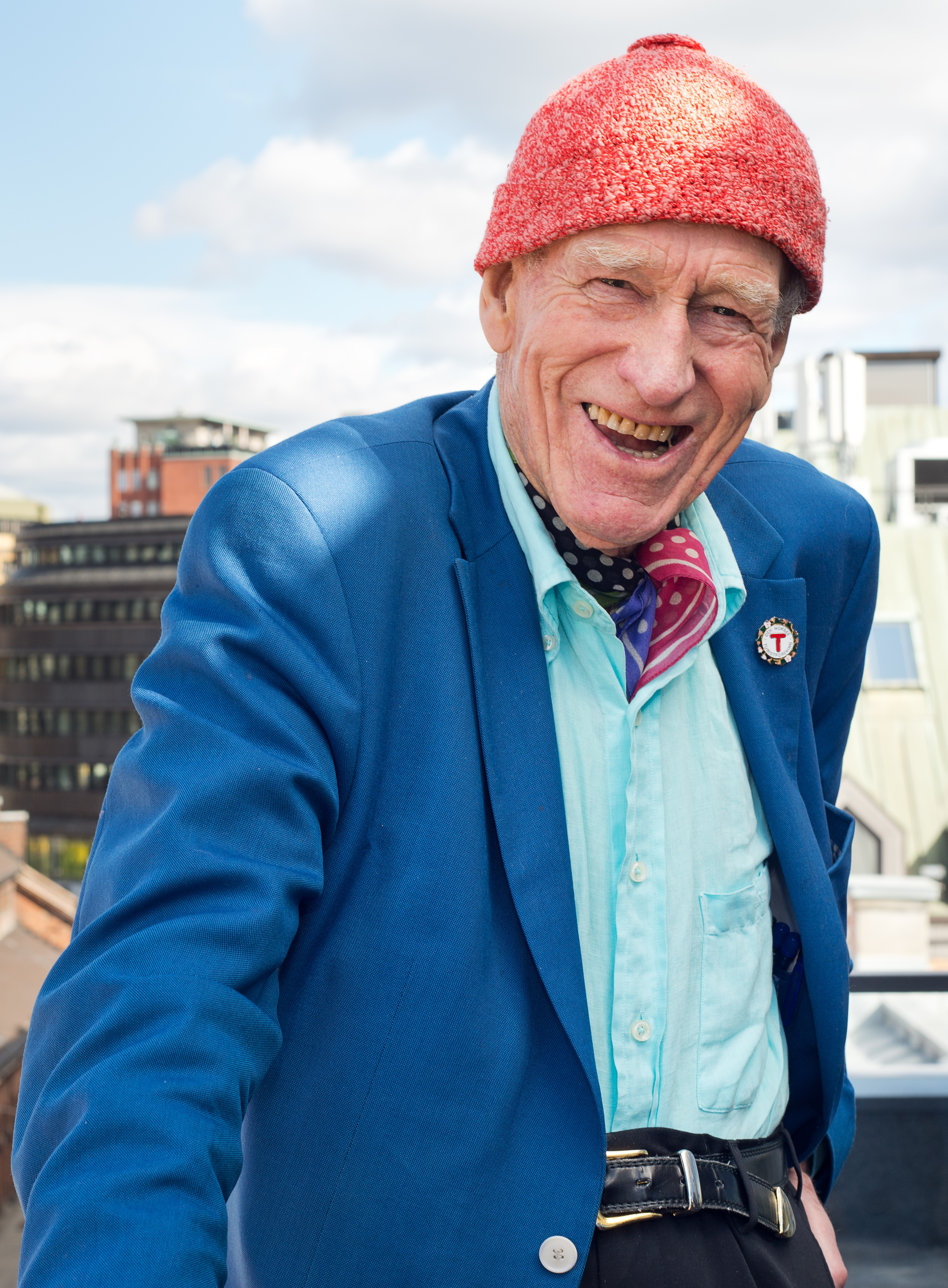
Thon

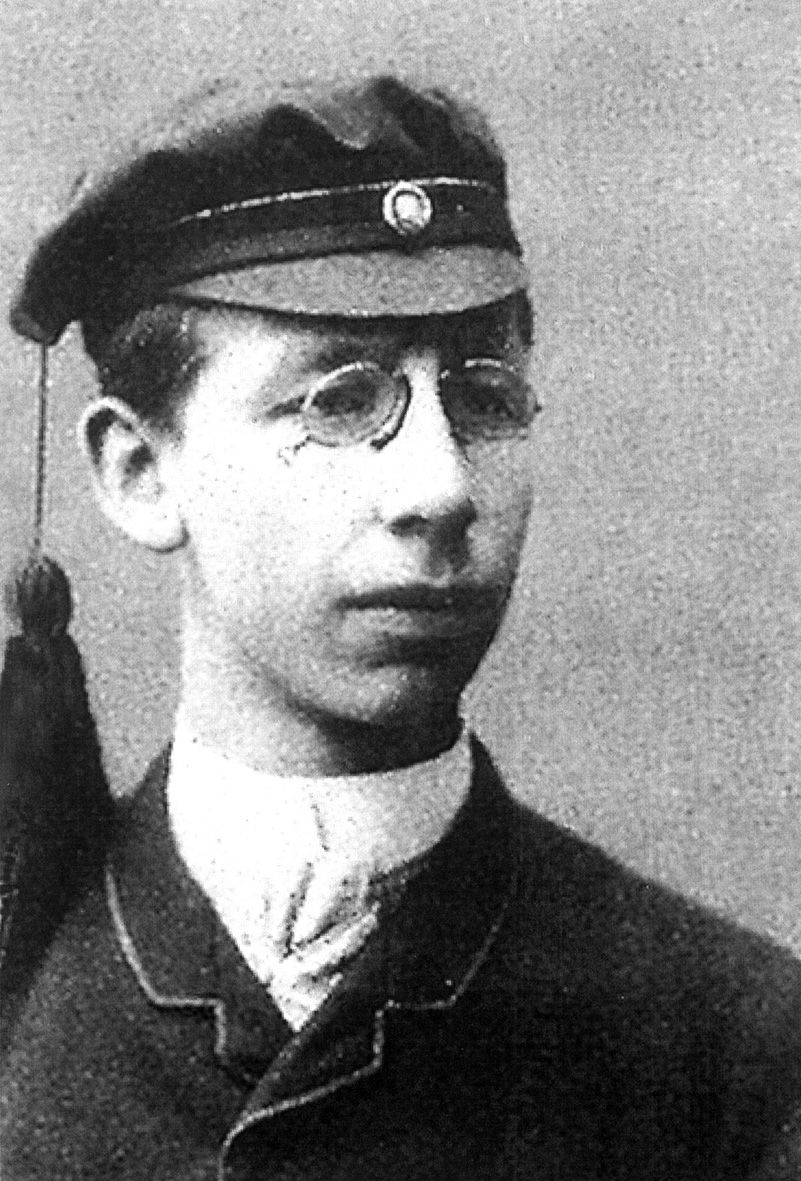
Vaaler

== World War II ==
- Carl Gustav Fleischer (1883–1942), first allied general to win a major victory against the Germans in World War II (Battle of Narvik).
- Gunvald Tomstad (1918–1970), resistance fighter/double agent (radio operator), who helped transmit axis ship movements to the allies and was partly responsible for helping discover and sink the Bismarck.
- Jens Christian Hauge, head of Milorg
- Johan Bernhard Hjort, Gross Kreutz group, White Buses operation
- Leif Larsen a.k.a. "Shetland's Larsen", WWII naval officer
- Arne Brun Lie, resistance
- Martin Linge, commander of SOE Norwegian Independent Company 1
- Max Manus, resistance fighter
- Sigurd Østrem, jurist and Nazi collaborator
- Vidkun Quisling, WWII 'prime minister' by coup d'état
- Ole Reistad, head of Little Norway
- Henry Rinnan, Gestapo agent, leader of Sonderabteilung Lola
- Otto Ruge, Commander-in-Chief
- Ludwig Schübeler, priest
- Arvid Storsveen, resistance, leader of XU
- Gunnar Sønsteby, resistance fighter

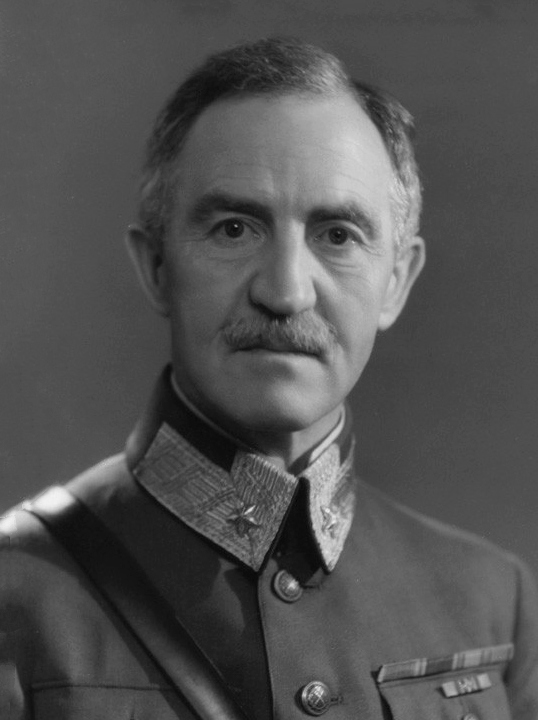
Fleischer

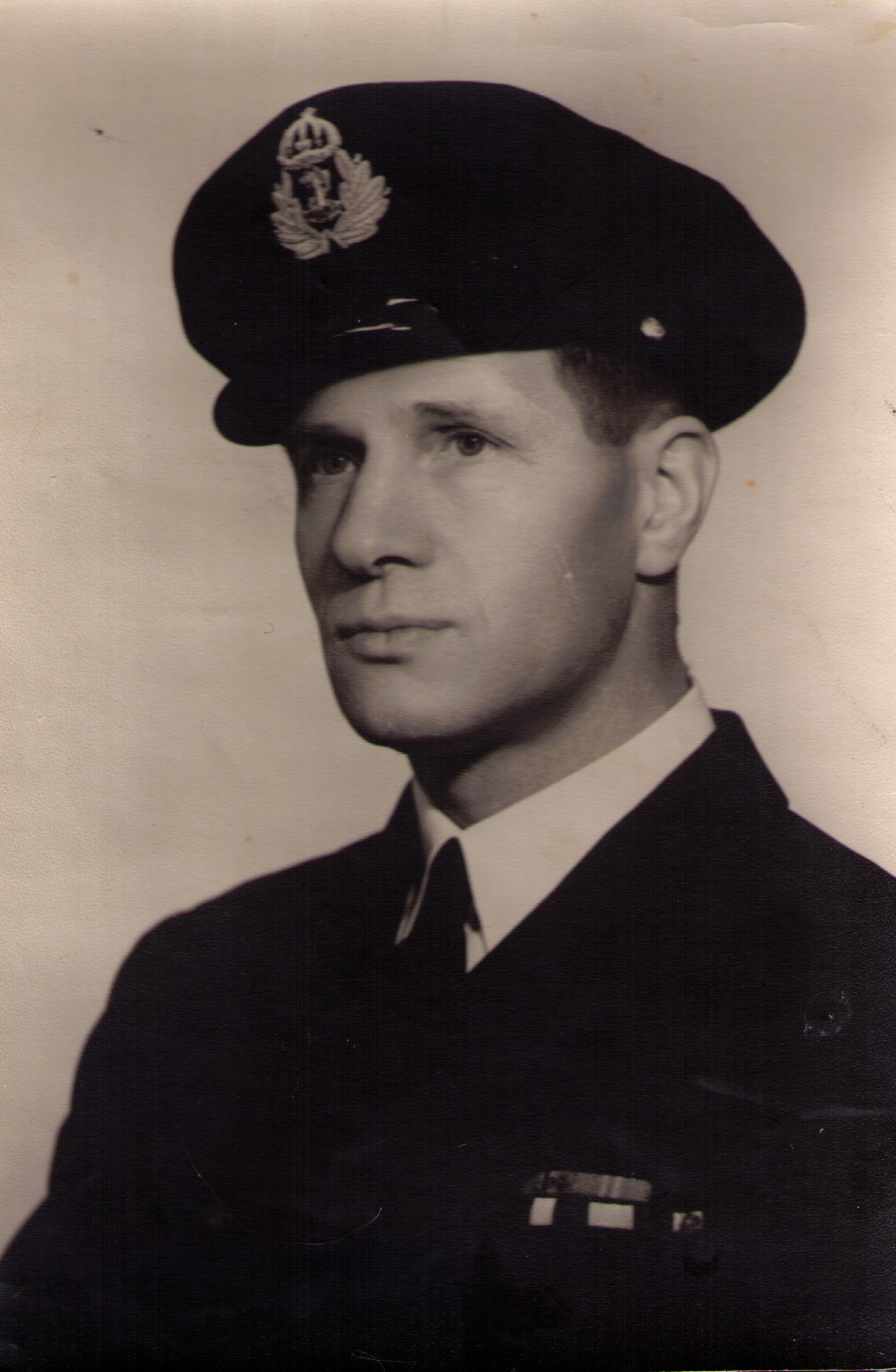
Larsen

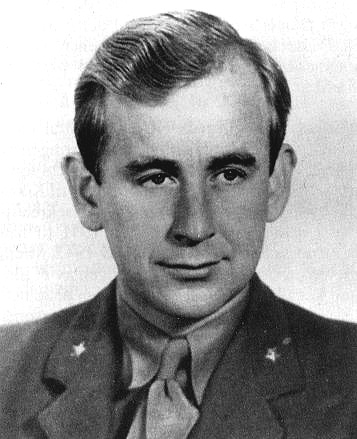
Manus

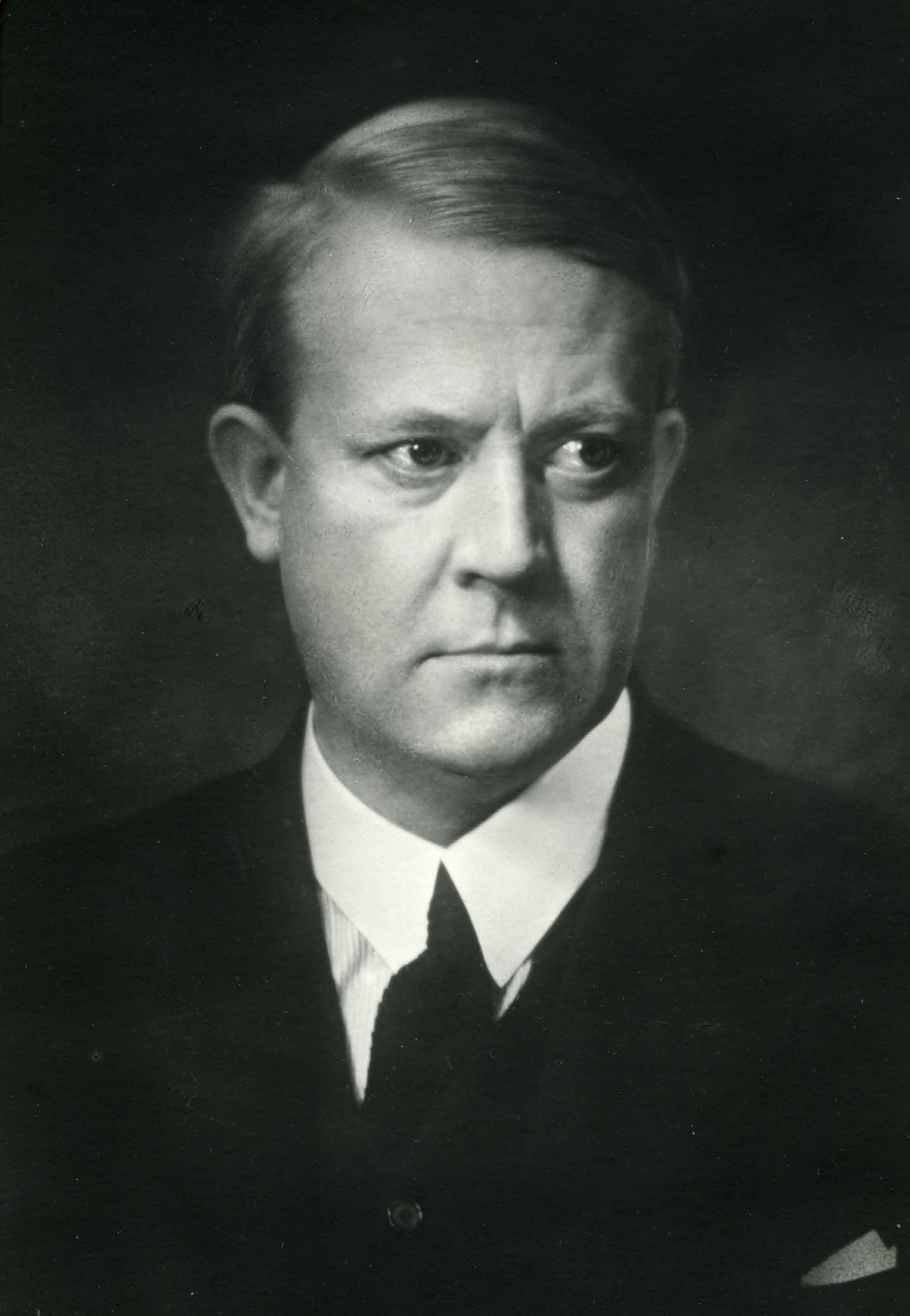
Quisling

== From other categories ==
- Arne Arnardo, circus performer and proprietor
- Johannes Berg, central fandom figure
- Astrid Bjellebø Bayegan (born 1943), Norway's first female prost or dean
- Cornelius Cruys, (1655–1727), first commander of the Russian Baltic Fleet
- Dagny Berger (1903–1950), Norway's first woman aviator
- Kristoffer Clausen, media personality
- Louise Kathrine Dedichen (born 1964), vice-admiral
- Astrid Eiriksdotter (b. 925), 10th-century Queen of Viken, Norway
- Andrew Furuseth, (1854–1938), merchant seaman and labour leader
- Lasse Gjertsen, animator and videographer
- Belle Gunness, serial killer
- Anders Behring Breivik, mass murderer
- Mona Grudt, Miss Universe 1990
- Anders Heger, publisher and writer
- Tharald Høyerup Blanc (1838–1921), theatre historian
- Eva Joly, judge
- Tomm Kristiansen, journalist and foreign news correspondent
- Knud Karl Krogh-Tonning (1842–1911), theologian
- Bjørge Lillelien, sports commentator
- Christian Lous Lange, internationalist, Nobel peace-prize laureate
- Erik Meyn (born 1955), television journalist
- Trude Mostue, TV-vet
- Eigil Nansen, humanist and architect
- Annette Obrestad, poker player
- Arne Rinnan, captain of MV Tampa
- Jacobine Rye (1851–1939), defense activist, educator of deaf children
- Åsne Seierstad, journalist
- Kjersti Løken Stavrum (born 1969), secretary general of the Norwegian Press Association
- Odd Arvid Strømstad (born 1952), television producer and director
- Peter Wessel Tordenskjold (1691–1720), naval hero of the Royal Dano-Norwegian Navy
- Arne Treholt, civil servant, alleged spy for the KGB, convicted of treason
- Unni Turrettini, author, lawyer, international speaker and human connection expert
- Linn Ullmann, journalist and author
- Vicky Vette, adult actress & most followed Norwegian on Twitter
- Herman Fredrik Zeiner-Gundersen, Chief of Defence of Norway and Chairman of the NATO Military Committee

== See also ==
- List of people by nationality
- List of Norwegian Americans
