= Calbe (Saale) Stadt station =

Railway station in Germany

Calbe (Saale) Stadt

General information
- Location: Salzer Straße; 39240 Calbe (Saale); Saxony-Anhalt; Germany
- Coordinates: 51.9138°N 11.7762°E
- Owner: DB Netz
- Operator: DB Station&Service
- Lines: Bernburg–Calbe (Saale) Ost railway (KBS 340)
- Platforms: 1 side platform
- Tracks: 1
- Train operators: Abellio Rail Mitteldeutschland

Other information
- Station code: 8234
- DS100 code: LCBS
- IBNR: 8011323
- Category: 7
- Fare zone: marego: 615
- Website: www.bahnhof.de

History
- Opened: 23 December 2014; 11 years ago

Services
| Preceding station | Abellio Rail Mitteldeutschland | Following station |
|---|---|---|
| Calbe (Saale) Ost towards Magdeburg Hbf | RB 47 | Calbe (Saale) West towards Halle (Saale) Hbf |
Location
- Location within Saxony-Anhalt

Calbe (Saale) Stadt station is a railway station in the northern part of the municipality of Calbe (Saale), located in the Salzlandkreis district in Saxony-Anhalt, Germany.
