= Kammler =

Kammler is a German surname. Notable people with the surname include:

- Ademar Kammler (born 1970), Brazilian racewalker
- Hans Kammler (1901–1945), German SS officer
- Steffen Kammler (born 1965), Norwegian conductor

== See also ==
- Kamler, a surname
