= Carl Høgset =

Norwegian conductor (1941–2021)

Carl Halvor Høgset (3 November 1941 – 2 June 2021) was a Norwegian lecturer, musician and choral conductor.

Høgset held degrees in language and musicology from the University of Oslo, 1974, as well as voice and choral conducting from the Norwegian Academy of Music, 1976. He was a student of the composer Knut Nystedt.

In 1971, Høgset founded the chamber choir Grex Vocalis. In 2012 he was appointed, for the second time, conductor of the Norwegian Student Choral Society (first time 1982–1985). He previously conducted the Norwegian Youth Choir (1987–2003).

Høgset was also a singer, with a career stretching back to his youth, when he was a member of Sølvguttene. Høgset in later years released a number of solo recordings of pieces by Henry Purcell, Georg Friedrich Händel, Edvard Grieg and Arne Nordheim.

As a lecturer, Høgset taught both in state schools and the Norwegian Academy of Music and ran courses and seminars for choir singers both in Norway and internationally.

In 2007, King Harold V awarded Høgset "Knight 1st Class", Royal Norwegian Order of Saint Olav, for his contribution to Norwegian music.

Høgset was an honorary member of the Norwegian Choir Conductor Society (Fonoko), as well as the Norwegian Student Choral Society. He was also one of two honorary members of "The Norwegian Choir Society"; the second being Norunn Illevold Giske.
