= Calbe (Saale) West station =

Railway station in Calbe, Germany

Calbe (Saale) West
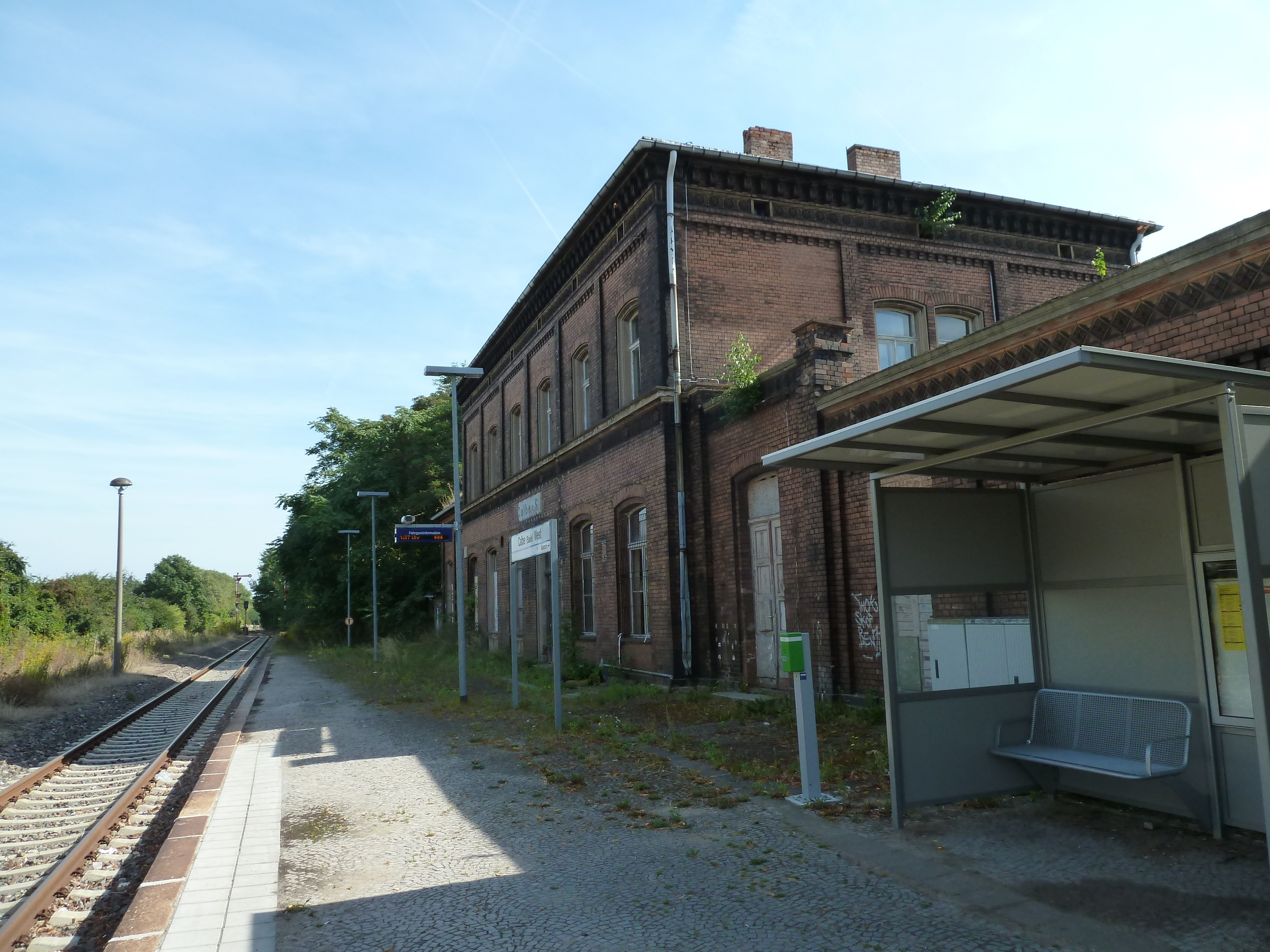
- 2012

General information
- Location: Bahnhofstraße; 39240 Calbe (Saale); Saxony-Anhalt; Germany
- Coordinates: 51.9051°N 11.7581°E
- Owner: DB Netz
- Operator: DB Station&Service
- Lines: Bernburg–Calbe (Saale) Ost railway (KBS 340)
- Platforms: 1 side platform
- Tracks: 1
- Train operators: Abellio Rail Mitteldeutschland

Other information
- Station code: 1021
- DS100 code: LCBW
- IBNR: 8010071
- Category: 7
- Fare zone: marego: 615
- Website: www.bahnhof.de

History
- Opened: 1879; 147 years ago

Services
Preceding station	Abellio Rail Mitteldeutschland	Following station
Calbe (Saale) Stadt towards Magdeburg Hbf	RB 47	Nienburg (Saale) towards Halle (Saale) Hbf
Location
- Location within Saxony-Anhalt

Calbe (Saale) West station is a railway station in the western part of the municipality of Calbe (Saale), located in the Salzlandkreis district in Saxony-Anhalt, Germany.
