= Calbe (Saale) Ost station =

Railway station in Calbe, Germany

Calbe (Saale) Ost
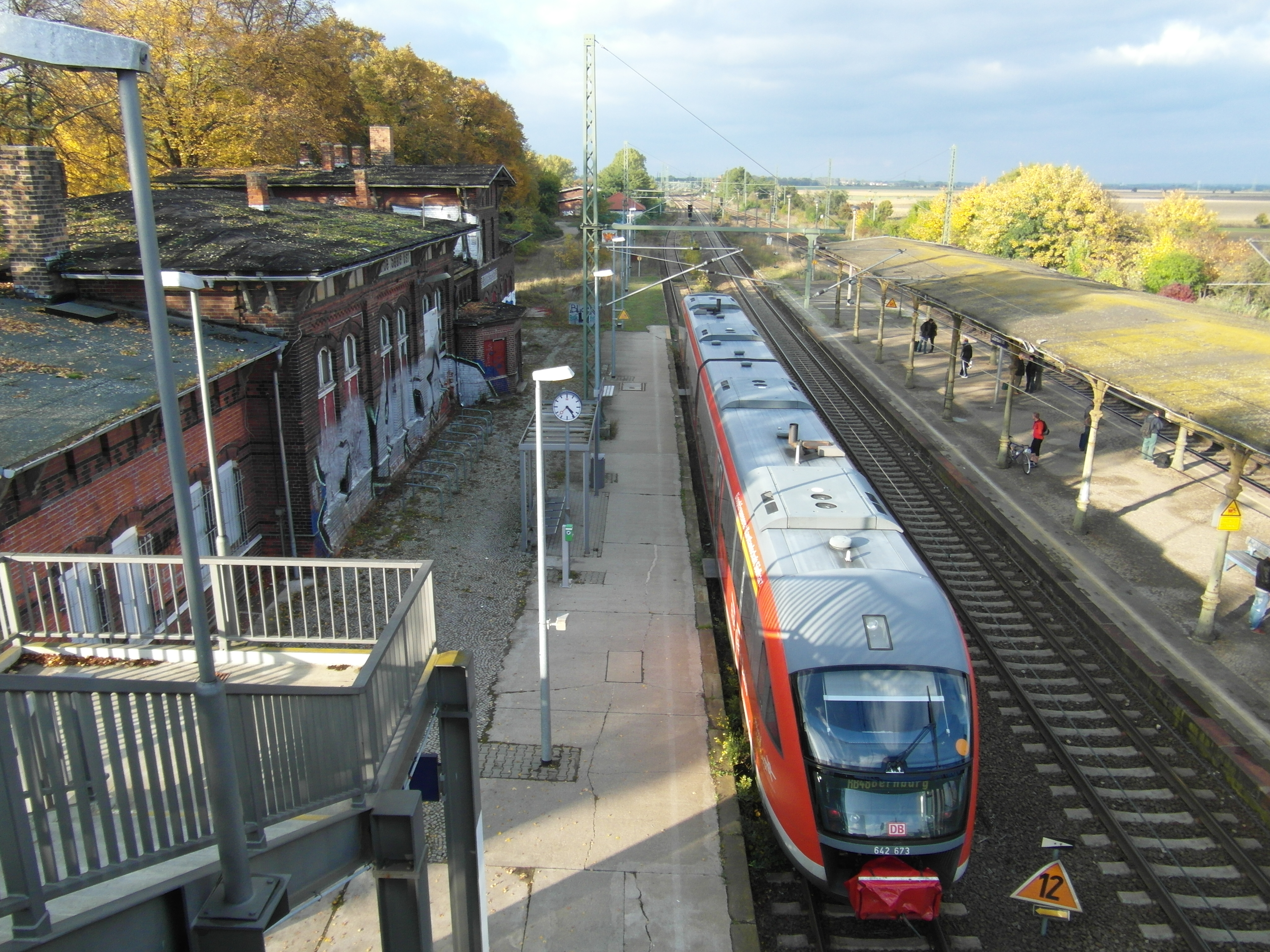
- 2013

General information
- Location: Grizehner Straße; 39240 Calbe (Saale); Saxony-Anhalt, Germany
- Coordinates: 51.9205°N 11.8103°E
- Owner: Deutsche Bahn
- Operator: DB Netz; DB Station&Service
- Lines: Magdeburg–Leipzig (KBS 340); Bernburg–Calbe (Salle) Ost (KBS 340)
- Platforms: 1 island platform 1 side platform
- Tracks: 4
- Train operators: Abellio Rail Mitteldeutschland; DB Regio Südost

Other information
- Station code: 1020
- DS100 code: LCBO
- IBNR: 8010070
- Category: 5
- Fare zone: marego: 615
- Website: www.bahnhof.de

History
- Opened: 9 September 1839; 186 years ago

Services
Preceding station	Abellio Rail Mitteldeutschland	Following station
Schönebeck (Elbe) towards Magdeburg Hbf	RB 47	Reverses direction
Calbe (Saale) Stadt towards Halle (Saale) Hbf	RB 47	Reverses direction
Location

Calbe (Saale) Ost station is a railway station in the eastern part of the municipality of Calbe (Saale), located in the Salzlandkreis district in Saxony-Anhalt, Germany.
