= Bernburg-Strenzfeld station =

Railway station in Germany

Bernburg-Strenzfeld
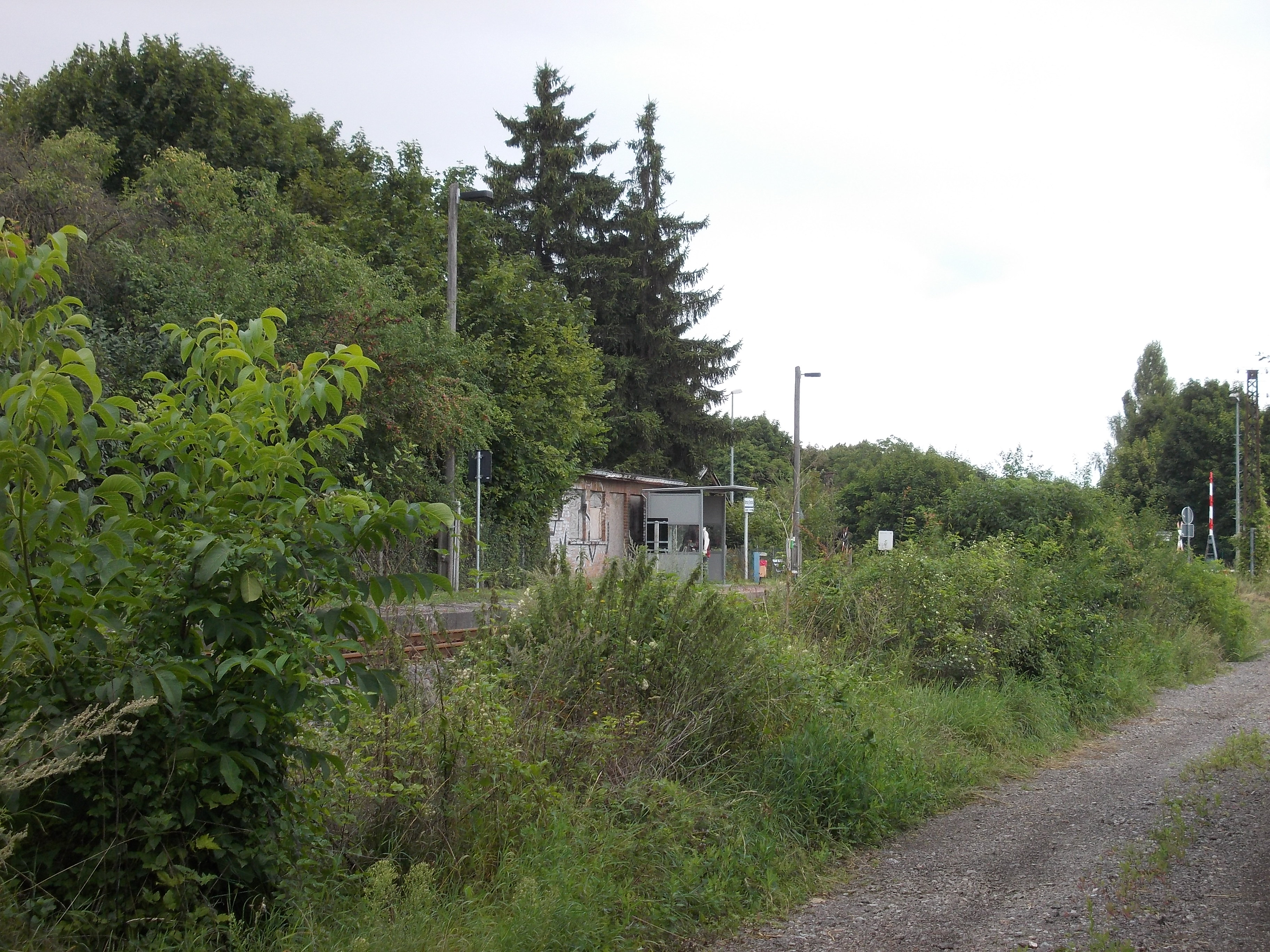
- 2013

General information
- Location: Magdeburger Chaussee; 06406 Bernburg; Saxony-Anhalt; Germany
- Coordinates: 51.8198°N 11.7175°E
- Owner: DB Netz
- Operator: DB Station&Service
- Lines: Bernburg–Calbe (Saale) Ost railway (KBS 340)
- Platforms: 1 side platform
- Tracks: 1
- Train operators: Abellio Rail Mitteldeutschland

Other information
- Station code: 575
- DS100 code: LBGS
- IBNR: 8011169
- Category: 6
- Fare zone: marego: 650
- Website: www.bahnhof.de

Services
Preceding station	Abellio Rail Mitteldeutschland	Following station
Nienburg (Saale) towards Magdeburg Hbf	RB 47	Bernburg-Waldau towards Halle (Saale) Hbf
Location
- Location within Saxony-Anhalt

Bernburg-Strenzfeld station is a railway station in the Strenzfeld district in the municipality of Bernburg, located in the Salzlandkreis district in Saxony-Anhalt, Germany.
