= Grex Vocalis =

Grex Vocalis (The Singing Band) is a Norwegian chamber choir, formed in 1971 by Carl Høgset. The repertoire spans from the renaissance to music by contemporary composers. The choir has been awarded the Norwegian Spellemannprisen prize (the Norwegian equivalent to a Grammy Award) for three of its thirteen albums (in 1977, 1983, and 2006) and has won first prizes in national and international contests (Arezzo, Gorizia, Tolosa and the International Chamber Choir Competition Marktoberdorf). In 1999 Grex Vocalis was awarded Il Gran Premio Città di Arezzo as the overall best choir in that year's contest. Grex Vocalis is primarily an a cappella choir, comprising ca. 35 singers, but performs on occasion also with soloists and orchestras. They have toured extensively in Europe, and also given a series of concerts in Japan and Cuba.

== History ==
Over the years Grex Vocalis has commissioned and premiered works by several Norwegian composers, including Knut Nystedt, Trond Kverno and Arne Nordheim. In 1994 the choir took part in the stage production of Arne Nordheim's monumental Draumkvedet, which with the Norwegian Broadcasting Radio Orchestra and soloists was performed 40 times. They have also performed important baroque works like Monteverdi's Vespers of 1610, Handel's Messiah, Bach's Christmas Oratorio, Rameau's In convertendo and Quam dilecta, Charpentier's Te Deum, Lully's Te Deum, Delalande's Te Deum, etc., with orchestras and soloists. Collaboration projects with Oslo Cathedral Choir and the Oslo Philharmonic Orchestra have led to performances of larger works like Brahms's Requiem, Penderecki's St. Luke Passion and Verdi's Quattro Pezzi Sacri.

The first Norwegian recording of Handel's Messiah was released in 1997 with Grex Vocalis and Oslo Baroque Orchestra. The choir's latest CDs, including "Magnum Mysterium" with Christmas music from several eras, "Crux" with Norwegian music from the 20th century, and "Liberté" with works by Francis Poulenc, have been particularly highly praised in the media, both at home and abroad.

Grex Vocalis is frequently heard on Norwegian radio and has also appeared in various television programmes. In the acclaimed Gymnaslærer Pedersens beretning om den store politiske vekkelse som har hjemsøkt vårt land 2006 film based on Dag Solstad's acclaimed Gymnaslærer Pedersens beretning om den store politiske vekkelse som har hjemsøkt vårt land 1982 novel, songs from the acclaimed Frihetens faner på ny CD were used.

The conductor Carl Høgset held degrees in languages and musicology from the University of Oslo as well as in voice and choral conducting from the Norwegian State Academy of Music. In 1977 he made his debut as a countertenor in a solo recital in Oslo. His solo-CD recording with songs by Purcell, Handel, Grieg and Nordheim was released in 1995. He was a member of the vocal quartet Quattro Stagioni. In December 2007 he was awarded the Ridder av 1. klasse av Den Kongelige St. Olavs Orden for his wide-ranging contributions for Norwegian choral music, in Norway as well as internationally.

== Discography ==
- Martin Romberg: Witch Mass - Lawo Music (LWM009) with Grex Vocalis, Det Norske Jentekor and Kammerkoret NOVA, 2015
- Edvard Grieg CHORAL MUSIC (2L45, 2007)
- Arne Nordheim: Draumkvedet (double-CD, Simax Classics, 2006)
- Magnum Mysterium (2L26, 2004)
- Francis Poulenc: Liberté (Simax Classics, 2000)
- CRUX (Edvard Grieg, Knut Nystedt, Arne Nordheim, Trond Kverno (QCD, 2000)
- Händel: Messias (double-CD, QCD, 1997)
- Terje Rypdal: "Ineo for Choir and Chamber Orchestra" on Undisonus (ECM, 1990)
- Norske stemninger (Norwegian moods) (Polygram, 2000)
- Frihetens faner på ny (Banners of Freedom) (Kirkelig Kulturverksted, 1988)
- Arne Nordheim: Aurora, Tres Lamentationes, Klokkesong (Aurora AR, 1986)
- Sigvald Tveit/Eyvind Skeie: Visst skal våren komme (Kirkelig Kulturverksted, 1984)
- Renessanse for kor (Kirkelig Kulturverksted, 1983)
- Contemporary Music from Norway (Phillips, 1980)
- Norwegian Folksongs & European Madrigals (Arne Bendiksen, 1977)

== Prizes and awards ==
- Winner of international choir competition organised by NRK, 1975
- Winner of international chamber choir competition in Arezzo, 1977
- Spellemannprisen in the category classical and contemporary music for Norwegian Folksongs & European Madrigals, 1977
- Winner of international chamber choir competition in Gorizia, 1982
- Spellemannprisen in the category classical and contemporary music klassen for Renessanse for kor, 1983
- Winner of international chamber choir competition in Tolosa, 1992
- Winner of international chamber choir competition in Marktoberdorf, 1993
- Winner of Il Gran Premio Cittá di Arezzo (the best choir, across categories) at the international choir competition in Arezzo, 1999
- Spellemannprisen in the category classical and contemporary music for Arne Nordheim: Draumkvedet (jointly with the Orchestra of the Norwegian Radio Broadcasting Corporation), 2006
