= Norwegian Student Choral Society =

Norwegian male choir founded in 1845

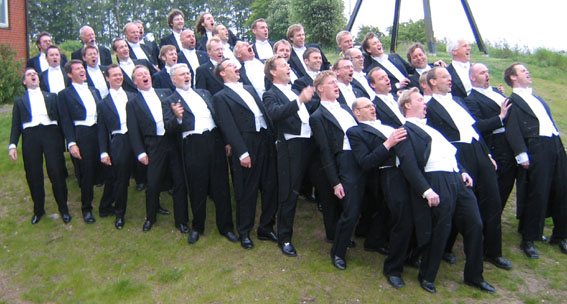
The choir in 2004.

The Norwegian Student Choral Society (Norwegian: Den norske Studentersangforening) is a Norwegian male voice choir, founded in 1845 by Johan Diederich Behrens. It is the second oldest choir in Norway and the official choir of the University of Oslo.

Premiering a number of well known pieces, including Norway's national anthem "Ja, vi elsker dette landet", the choir is most commonly known for their yearly outdoor concert at University Square on 17 May, the Norwegian Constitution Day. The concert is broadcast live on NRK Radio.

The choirs' first official performance was at Henrik Wergeland's funeral.

Commonly referred to as "DnS" by members and friends, the choir holds regular concerts, both independently and in collaboration with other artists, choirs and orchestras.

== Present day choir ==
As of 2016, the choir has around 60 active singers, who are conducted by Marit Tøndel Bodsberg.

It consists of the so-called "Main Choir", containing the most active members, and a number of older members, with their own conductor, who go by the name "DnS Pluss".

DnS have competed in a number of international competitions. In the World Choir Games of 2006, in Xiamen, China, it won first place in the male voice choir category and third place in sacred choral music

== Conductors ==
- Halfdan Kjerulf (1815 – 1868) 1845 – 1849
- Johan Diederich Behrens (1820 – 1890) 1849 – 1888
- Olaus Andreas Grøndahl (1847 – 1923) 1888 – 1912
- Ansgar Guldberg (1868 – 1924) 1912 – 1916
- Per Winge (1858 – 1935) 1916 – 1919
- Emil Nielsen (1877 – 1942) 1919 – 1929
- Sigurd Torkildsen (1897 – 1990) 1929 – 1961
- Sverre Bruland (1923) 1961 – 1973
- Torstein Grythe (1918 – 2009) 1973 – 1976
- Øyvind Otterstad (1944 – 1986) 1976 – 1980
- Sverre Bruland (1923) 1980 – 1982
- Carl Høgset (1941) 1982 – 1985
- Trond Dahlen (1955) 1986 – 1991
- Tone Bianca Dahl (1960) 1991 – 2003
- Thomas Caplin (1960) 2003-2008
- Ketil J.B. Belsaas (1969) 2007-2008
- Steffen Kammler (1965) 2009 – 2011
- Carl Høgset (1941) 2012 – 2015
- Marit Tøndel Bodsberg (1981) 2016 –

== Excerpts from DnS' history ==
=== Johan Diederich Behrens ===
Founder of The Norwegian Student Choral Society was Johan Diederich Behrens; and the "Johan Behrens Quartet", a male voice ensemble founded in 1843, formed the core of the first choir. The initial reason for the formation of the choir was a wish, in the summer of 1845, to participate at the Nordic student meeting in Lund and Copenhagen. The students contacted Behrens a short time before their departure to Copenhagen. Behrens, at first, declined to assist in the formation of choir due to the limited amount of time they had left to rehearse. He was eventually persuaded and accepted on the condition that he had the final word on which songs were rehearsed well enough for performance. On July 10, 1845, the society's laws were signed. However, Behrens, wanting to focus on his studies, did not wish to continue as conductor; and passed on the job to Halfdan Kjerulf.

=== Chronology ===
1845 "Studentertog" to Copenhagen results in formation of DnS. The society is founded on 10 July 1845. (21 November is later officiated as jubilee day)

1849 "Aftenunderholdning" in Christiania Theater. "Brudefærden i Hardanger" performed for the first time. Johan D. Behrens takes over from Halfdan Kjerulf as conductor

1861 Oslo University 50th anniversary. Cantata by Welhaven/Arnold.

1863 Fifth public song festival in Bergen. Celebration of student unions 50th birthday.

1865 DnS' 20th jubilee. Bjørnson, Welhaven, Vinje, Ole Bull and Halfdan Kjerulf amongst the guests. Bjørnson holds keynote speech. "Studenter-sangforeningens Vise" by Bjørnson and "Fjellguten i songarlaget av studentar i Christiania" by Vinje composed for the event.

1868 Spring concert: "Aftenrøster" by Johan Svendsen performed for the first time. Halfdan Kjerulf laid to rest.

1869 Nordic student meeting in Christiania.

1870 DnS' 25th jubilee. Bjørnson, Grieg, Jonas Lie, Andreas Munch and Theodor Kjerulf amongst the guests.

1872 Concert with Bazaar to raise funds for the restoration of Trondheim cathedral. "Landkænning" performed for the first time.

1874 Halfdan Kjerulf monument unveiled at "Halfdan Kjerulfs Plass".

1875 Karl-Johan monument unveiled: Cantata by Jørgen Moe/F.A. Reissiger. (Elite choir "Johanitterne" founded.)

1878 Song tour to Paris (together with "Allmänna Sången", Uppsala). Concerts in Drammen, Arendal, Christianssand, Paris, Le Havre and Christiania.

1881 Wergeland monument unveiled: Cantata by Jonas Lie/Johan Svendsen.

1888 Johan D. Behrens steps down as conductor. O.A. Grøndahl appointed. First Nordic music festival in Copenhagen.

1889 Concert tour to Paris. Performances in Drammen, Arendal, Christianssand, Paris and Le Havre.

1891 Student union and Student Choral Society's party and parade in honour of Edvard Grieg.

1893 Performance for Camilla Collett on her 80th birthday. Parade for Jonas Lie.

1895 DnS' 50th jubilee. "The Order of DnS" established.

1905 First tour to USA.

1906 Rikard Nordraaks monolith in Berlin unveiled, with participation by Bjørnstjerne Bjørnson and the Student Choral Society.

1908 Denmark tour with concerts in Copenhagen, Roskilde, Aarhus, Odense and Nyborg.

1911 Oslo University 100th anniversary. The new "University Hall" is inaugurated. University cantata "Lyset" is performed for the first time.

1912 O.A. Grøndahl slutter steps down as conductor. Ansgar Guldberg appointed.

1916 Ansgar Guldberg steps down as conductor. Per Winge takes over. "Guldbergs Academic Choir" founded.

1922 Sørland tour with concerts in Sanderfjord, Skien, Larvik, Arendal and Kristiansand.

1923 Northern Norway tour with concerts in Lillehammer, Trondheim, Namsos, Mosjøen, Bodø, Melbu, Harstad, Tromsø, Hammerfest and Sandnessjøen.

1924 Scandinavian Student Meet in Stockholm. Trondheim Student Choral Society visit Kristiania for the first time

1928 West Coast tour with concerts in Bergen, Haugesund, Stavanger, Flekkefjord and Kristiansand.

1929 Emil Nielsen steps down as conductor. Sigurd Torkildsen takes over. Birthday concert for Johan Halvorsens 60th.

1939 Second tour to USA.

1945 Performance at National theatre. Song tour to Denmark. 100 year jubilee.

1948 Tour to Møre, with konserts in Gjøvik, Hamar, Kristiansand, Molde, Ålesund and Åndalsnes.

1949 Finland tour.

1960 Northern Norway tour with concerts in konserter i Tromsø, Harstad, Svolvær and Bodø.

1961 Sigurd Torkildsen steps down as conductor, Sverre Bruland appointed.

1962 Iceland tour with concerts in Reykjavik and Akureyri.

1964 Finland tour with concerts in Åbo og Helsingfors.

1966 Czechoslovakia tour

1968 West Germany tour with concerts in Kiel and Hamburg.

1972 Unification Anniversary. Performances in Hafrsfjord, Ullandhaug, Haraldshaugen and Skudeneshavn.

1973 Sverre Bruland steps down as conductor, Torstein Grythe steps in. 8th Nordic student song meet in Århus.

1976 Torstein Grythe steps down as conductor, Øyvind Otterstad appointed.

1978 "Academic Choir Meet" in Trondheim.

1980 Øyvind Otterstad steps down as conductor, Sverre Bruland temporarily appointed.

1982 Performance for His Majesty King Olav V, in honour of his 25th jubilee. Sverre Bruland steps down as conductor, Carl Høgset steps in.

1984 Italy tour. "Academic Choir Meet" in Oslo.

1985 Italy tour. Participants in international choir competition, Arezzo. 3rd place. Carl Høgset steps down as conductor, Trond Dahlen steps in.

1986 "Academic Choir Meet" in Trondheim.

1991 Trond Dahlen slutter steps down as conductor. Tone Bianca Dahl appointed.

1993 Tour to England and Wales. Concerts in London, Canterbury and Sandwich. Participants in "Llangollen International Musical Eisteddfod". 3rd place in male choir category, and 3rd place in folk music category. "Nordic Student Choir Meet" in Trondheim.

1994 Tour to Greece. Concert in Piraeus. Participation in Athens international choir competition. 1st place in equal voices category.

1995 150th anniversary. "Natten skrider förbi" by Knut Nystedt performed for first time at anniversary concert. Third tour to USA. CD "DnS i 150!" released.

1996 Tour to Spain. Participation in the international choir games, Tolosa. Two 3rd places.

1997 Tour to Germany, with an invitation to the "Ostsee Choir Festival" in Flensburg

1999 Participation in the national choir games "Syng For Oss" in Bergen. 1st place in A-class for male choir. "Kullervo-symfoni" by Jean Sibelius performed together with the Oslo Philomonic and choir. CD "Transeamus usque Bethlehem" released. Nordic Academic Choir Meet in Tallinn.

2000 Tour to Wales and Ireland, with concert in St. Patricks cathedral, Dublin. Participation in the "Llangollen International Musical Eisteddfod". 3rd place in male choir category.

2001 DnS moves to new premises in Professor Dahls gate 8. The CD "En mannshowinistisk aften" is released.

2003 Tone Bianca Dahl steps down as conductor, Thomas Caplin appointed new conductor.

2004 DnS wins male choir category, and takes 3rd place for church music in the international choir games, Helsingborg.

2005 CD/DVD "Norske Perspektiver" is released on 7 June. Collaborative project with "Collegium Vocale" from Hamar.

2006 DnS takes first place in Male Choir category at The International Choir Olympics in Xiamen, China.

2007 DnS takes first place in Sacred Choral Music category, and 2nd place in category for world music at the 2nd international choir games in Bergen. Ketil J.B. Belsaas steps in temporarily for Thomas Caplin.

2008 Thomas Caplin steps down as conductor, Ketil J.B. Belsaas appointed on temporary basis.

2009 Steffen Kammler appointed as conductor.

2012 Carl Høgset is appointed as conductor.

2015 The CD "Sangen har lysning" is released on September 18.

2016 Marit Tøndel Bodsberg is appointed as conductor.
