= Bernburg-Friedenshall station =

Railway station in Saxony-Anhalt, Germany

Bernburg-Friedenshall
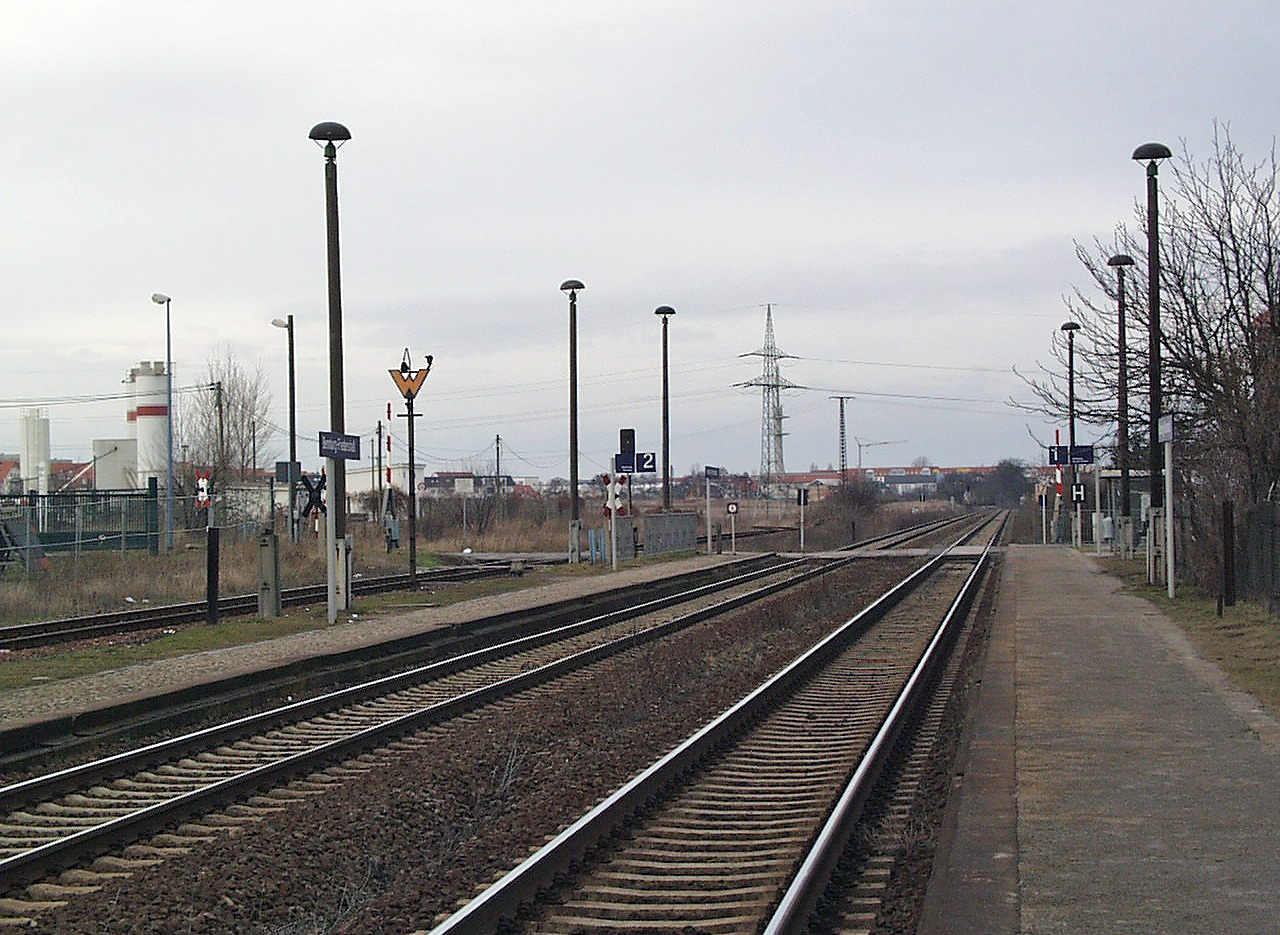
- 2001

General information
- Location: Schachtstraße; 06406 Bernburg; Saxony-Anhalt; Germany
- Coordinates: 51.7736°N 11.7688°E
- Owner: DB Netz
- Operator: DB Station&Service
- Lines: Köthen–Aschersleben railway (KBS 334)
- Platforms: 2 side platforms
- Tracks: 3
- Train operators: Abellio Rail Mitteldeutschland

Other information
- Station code: 574
- DS100 code: LBGF
- IBNR: 8011168
- Category: 6
- Website: www.bahnhof.de

History
- Opened: 1 October 1897; 128 years ago

Services
Preceding station	Abellio Rail Mitteldeutschland	Following station
Bernburg Hbf towards Magdeburg Hbf	RB 47	Baalberge towards Halle (Saale) Hbf
Bernburg Hbf towards Aschersleben	RB 50	Baalberge towards Dessau Hbf
Location
- Location within Saxony-Anhalt

Bernburg-Friedenshall station is a railway station in the Friedenshall district in the municipality of Bernburg, located in the Salzlandkreis district in Saxony-Anhalt, Germany.
