= Bernburg Hauptbahnhof =

Railway station in Bernburg, Germany

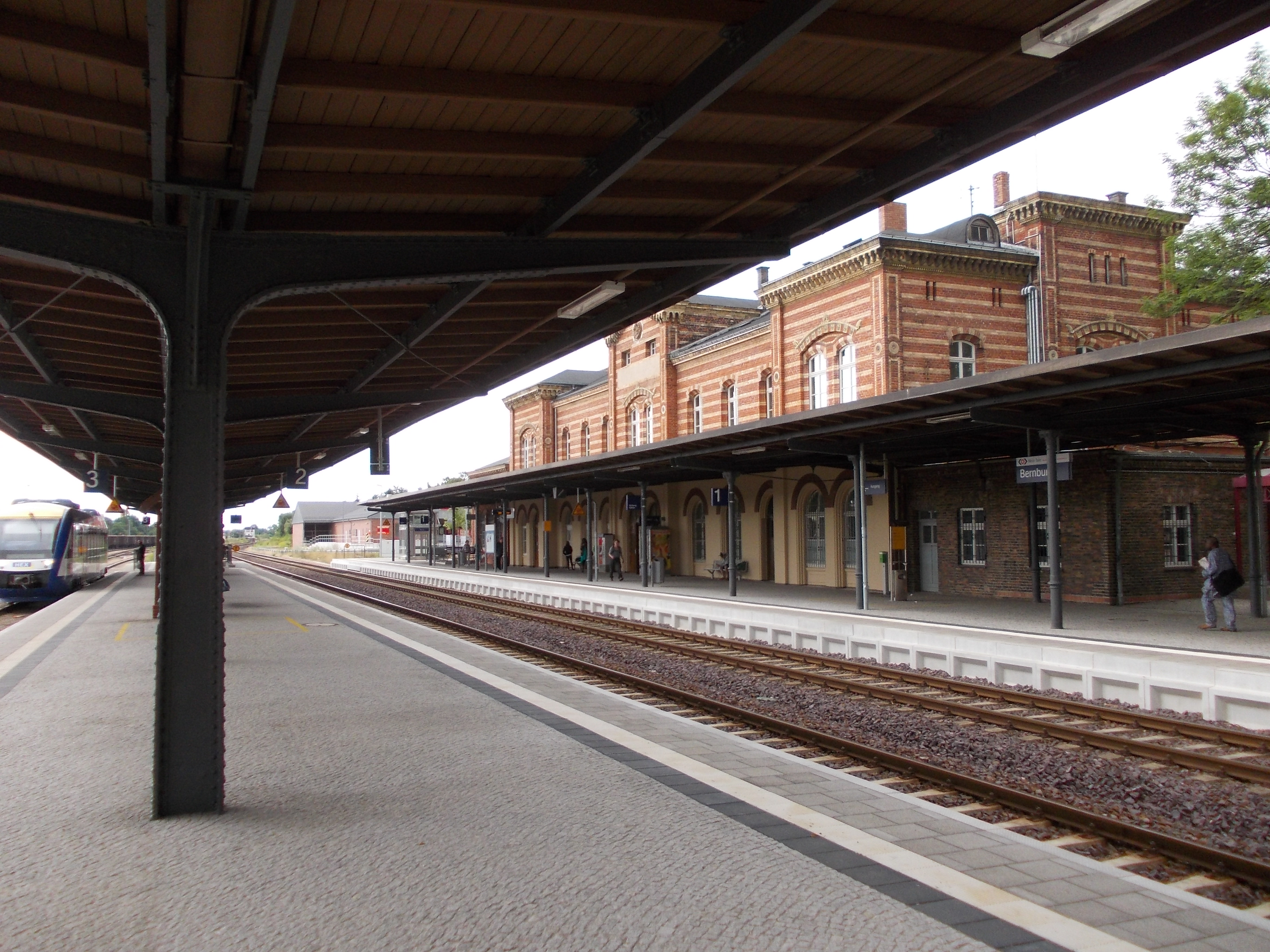
- 2013

General information
- Location: Bahnhofstraße 1; 06404 Bernburg; Saxony-Anhalt; Germany
- Coordinates: 51.7960°N 11.7511°E
- System: Bf
- Owner: DB Netz
- Operator: DB Station&Service
- Lines: Köthen–Aschersleben railway (KBS 334); Bernburg–Calbe (Saale) Ost railway (KBS 340)
- Platforms: 1 island platform 1 side platform
- Tracks: 3
- Train operators: Abellio Rail Mitteldeutschland

Other information
- Station code: 573
- DS100 code: LBG
- IBNR: 8010043
- Category: 5
- Fare zone: marego: 650
- Website: www.bahnhof.de

History
- Opened: 10 September 1846; 179 years ago

Services
Preceding station	Abellio Rail Mitteldeutschland	Following station
Aschersleben towards Goslar	Harz-Berlin-Express	Köthen towards Berlin Ostbahnhof
Bernburg-Waldau towards Magdeburg Hbf	RB 47	Bernburg-Friedenshall towards Halle (Saale) Hbf
Ilberstedt towards Aschersleben	RB 50	Bernburg-Friedenshall towards Dessau Hbf
Location
- Location within Saxony-Anhalt

Bernburg Hauptbahnhof is a railway station in the municipality of Bernburg, located in the Salzlandkreis district in Saxony-Anhalt, Germany.
