= Nienburg (Saale) station =

Railway station in Germany

Nienburg (Saale)
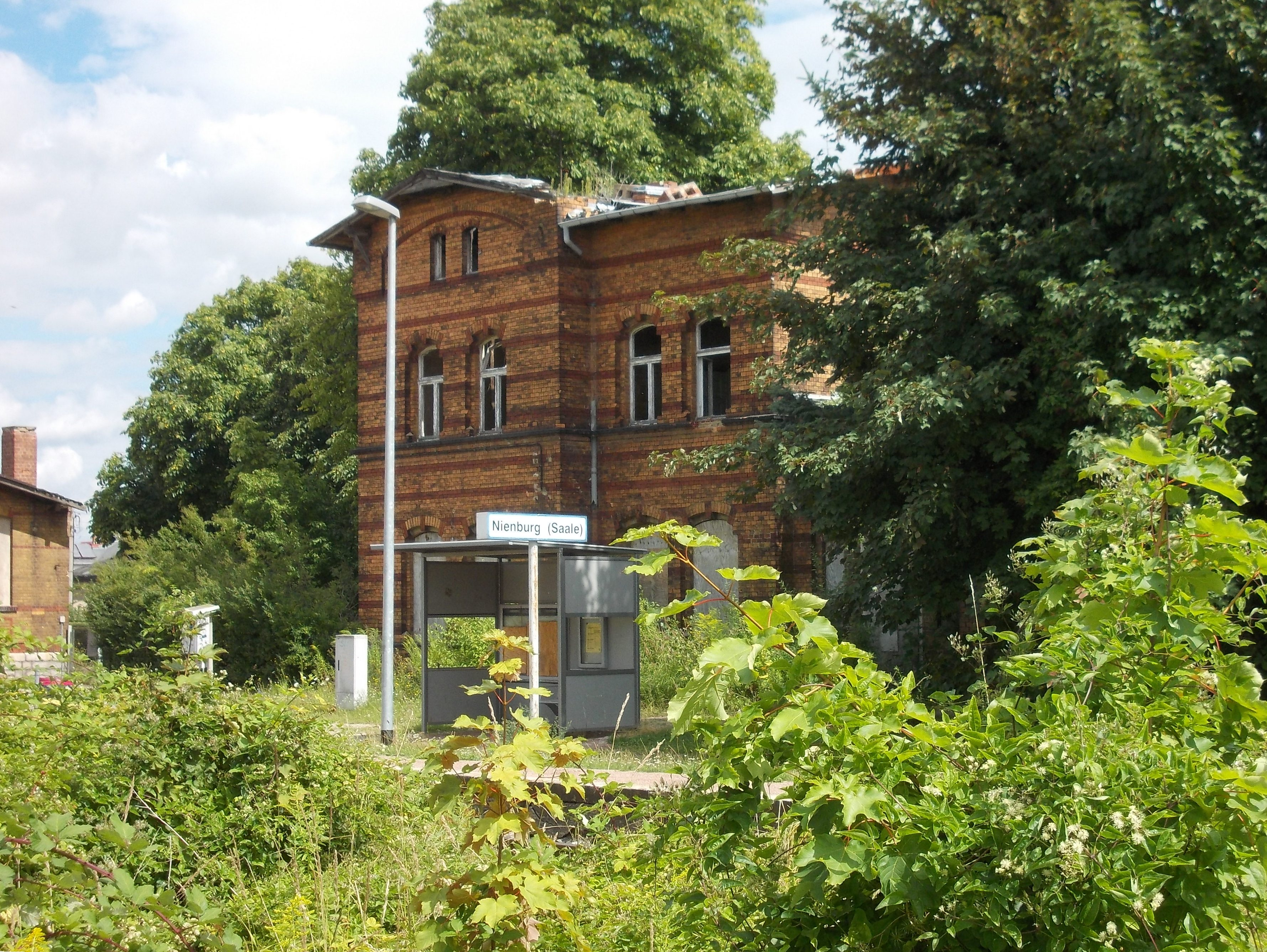
- 2013

General information
- Location: Bahnhofstraße 1; 06429 Nienburg (Saale); Saxony-Anhalt; Germany
- Coordinates: 51.8386°N 11.7619°E
- Owner: DB InfraGO
- Operator: DB InfraGO
- Lines: Bernburg–Calbe (Saale) Ost railway (KBS 340)
- Platforms: 1 side platform
- Tracks: 1
- Train operators: Regionalverkehre Start Deutschland

Other information
- Station code: 4547
- DS100 code: LNB
- IBNR: 8012507
- Category: 7
- Fare zone: marego: 651
- Website: www.bahnhof.de

Services
Preceding station	Start	Following station
Calbe (Saale) West towards Magdeburg Hbf	RB 47	Bernburg-Strenzfeld towards Halle (Saale) Hbf
Location
- Location within Saxony-Anhalt

Nienburg (Saale) station was a railway station in the municipality of Nienburg (Saale), located in the Salzlandkreis district in Saxony-Anhalt, Germany.
