= Torstein Grythe =

Norwegian musician

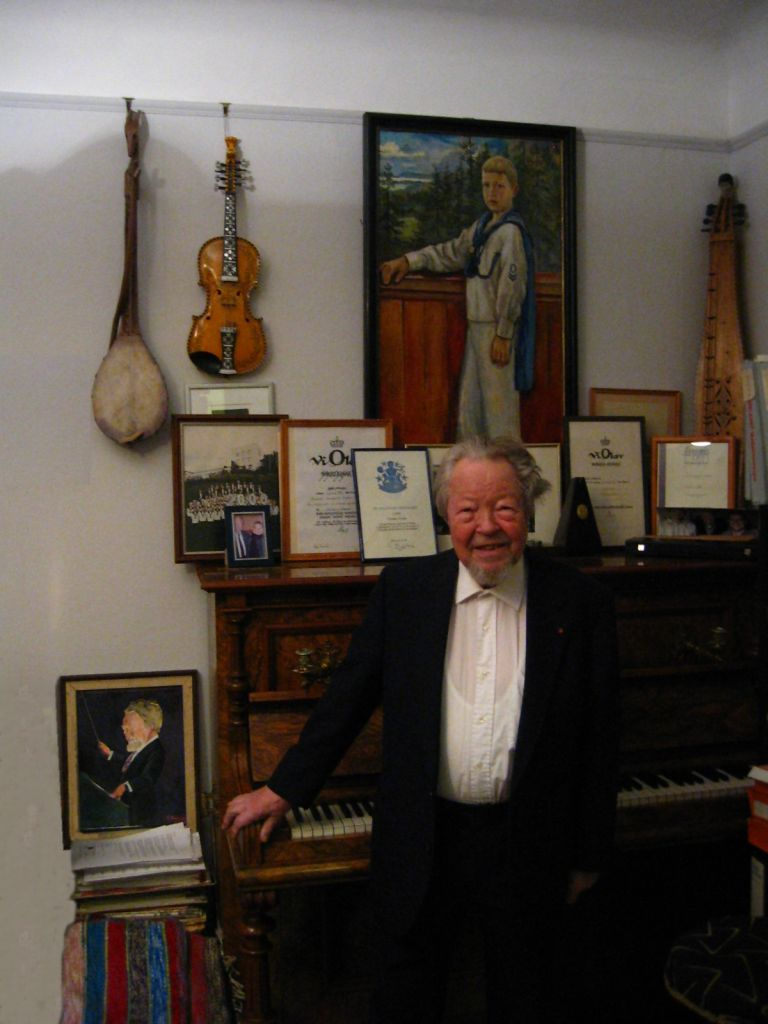
Torstein Grythe, 2005.

Torstein Eliot Berg Grythe (24 November 1918 – 1 May 2009) was a Norwegian choir leader.

He was born in Kristiania as a son of tailor Endre Grythe (1882–1955) and Asta Berg (1897–1978). He enrolled in violin studies at the Norwegian Academy of Music in 1927, and joined the boys' choir Olavsguttene in 1928 and Oslo Domkor in 1932. He became vice conductor under Arild Sandvold. In 1940 he started the boys' choir Sølvguttene ("The Silver Boys"). During the occupation of Norway by Nazi Germany he was arrested on 29 November 1943 and was imprisoned in Grini concentration camp until 23 December. In August 1946 he married civil servant Eva-Marie Lindegaard.

Sølvguttene was ultimately organized in relation to Operation Weserübung. Grythe had played the viola in the Norwegian Broadcasting Corporation radio orchestra since 1937. In 1951 he was appointed as conductor of the Norwegian Broadcasting Corporation boys' choir, founded in 1947. The choir was incorporated into Sølvguttene in 1967, and conducted the choir until 2004.

He also conducted other choirs, including the Bondeungdomslaget men's choir in 1952 and the Norwegian Student Choral Society from 1973 to 1976. He was a music teacher at Foss Upper Secondary School from 1955 to 1972 and at Oslo Teachers' College from 1972 to 1987.

He was decorated with The King's Medal of Merit in gold, the Medal of St. Hallvard and the Royal Norwegian Order of St. Olav. He received silver and gold records, the Spellemann Honorary Award in 1990, and the Gammleng Prize in 1996.
