= Bernburg-Waldau station =

Railway station in Germany

Bernburg-Waldau
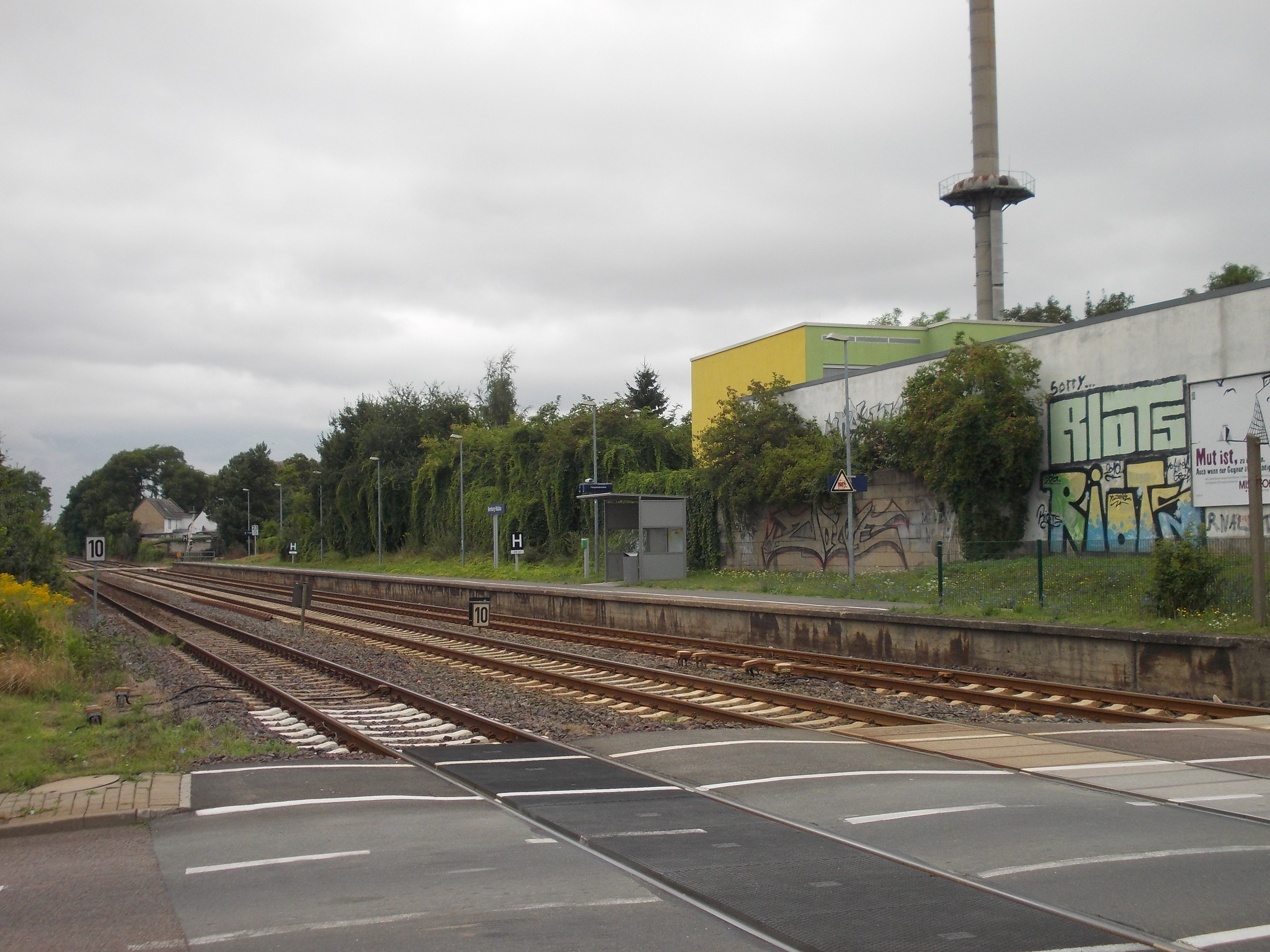
- 2013

General information
- Location: Magdeburger Straße; 06406 Bernburg; Saxony-Anhalt; Germany
- Coordinates: 51.8059°N 11.7229°E
- Owner: DB Netz
- Operator: DB Station&Service
- Lines: Köthen–Aschersleben railway (KBS 334); Bernburg–Calbe (Saale) Ost railway (KBS 340)
- Platforms: 1 side platform
- Tracks: 3
- Train operators: Abellio Rail Mitteldeutschland

Other information
- Station code: 576
- DS100 code: LBGW,LBWD
- IBNR: 8011170
- Category: 7
- Fare zone: marego: 650
- Website: www.bahnhof.de

Services
Preceding station	Abellio Rail Mitteldeutschland	Following station
Bernburg-Strenzfeld towards Magdeburg Hbf	RB 47	Bernburg Hbf towards Halle (Saale) Hbf
Location
- Location within Saxony-Anhalt

Bernburg-Waldau station is a railway station in the Waldau district in the municipality of Bernburg, located in the Salzlandkreis district in Saxony-Anhalt, Germany.
