= Martin Romberg =

Norwegian classical composer (born 1978)

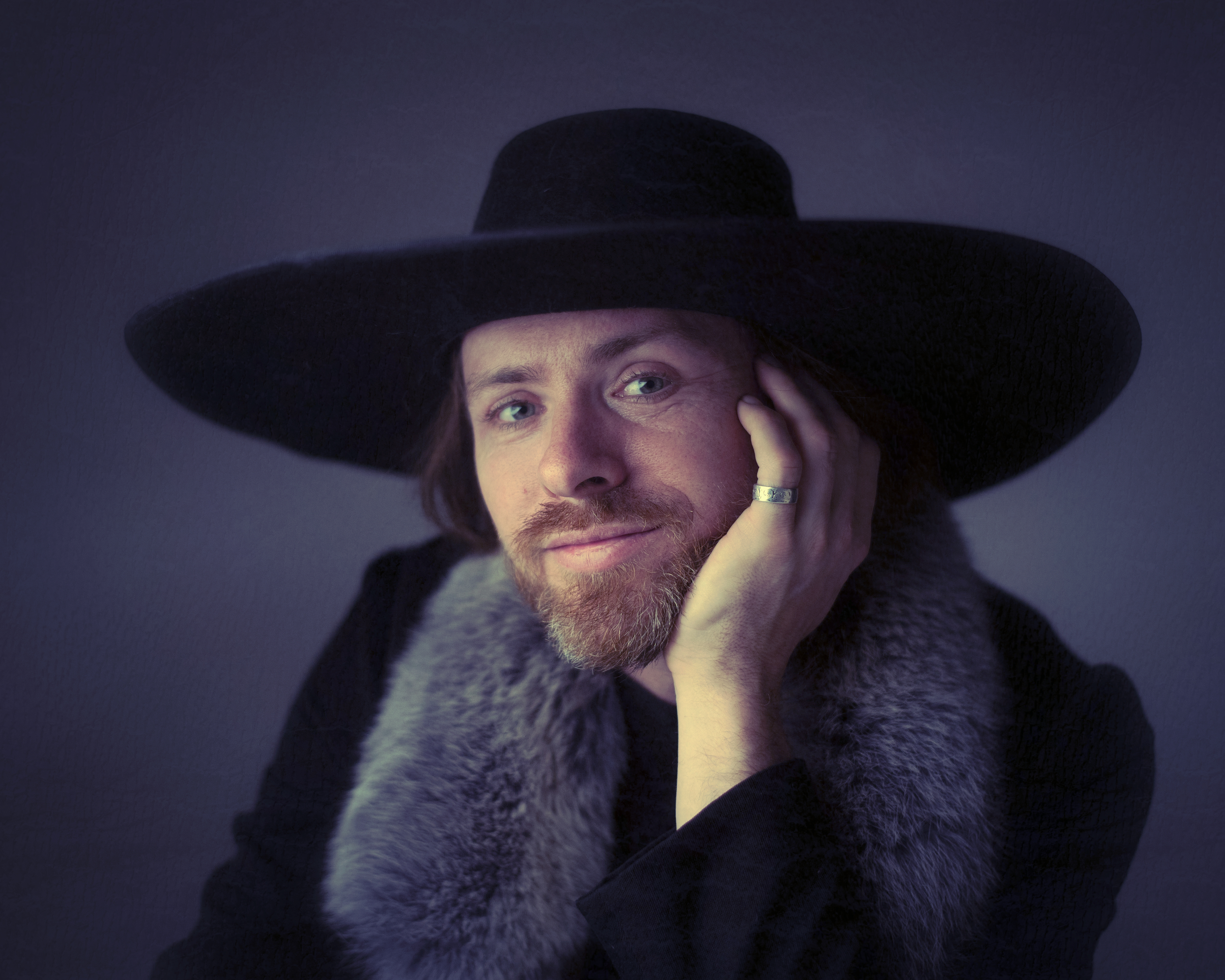
- ©Rune Hammerstad

Background information
- Born: January 3, 1978 (age 48); Oslo, Norway
- Genre: Contemporary classical music
- Occupation: Composer
- Years active: 2006-present
- Labels: Lawo Classics, Audio Network, Klarthe Records
- Website: www.martinromberg.com

Martin Romberg (born 3 January 1978) is a Norwegian neo-romantic contemporary composer. He is one of the most active orchestral composers of his generation in Scandinavia. He is mostly known for his fantasy literature and inspired orchestral and choral works, notably treating themes and texts by J.R.R Tolkien, H.P. Lovecraft and Robert E. Howard, as well as pre-Christian, archaic and Celtic-Christian textual material.

== Biography ==
Being born to a working-class family in Oslo, Romberg early moved out of Norway to study classical music at the University of Music and Performing Arts Vienna, Austria, from 1997 to 2005. From the early 2000s onwards, Romberg's career as a composer, writer and music publisher took him on a dynamic path, both nationally and internationally. Breaking the bond with modernist tradition and his composition teacher Michael Jarrell, he embraced neo-romanticism from 2006. Notably, his compositions have been published by Éditions Billaudot in Paris and performed by numerous esteemed orchestras around the world. Among these are The Astana Symphony Orchestra, The Bergen Philharmonic Orchestra, The Deutsches Filmorchester Babelsberg, Orchestre national Montpellier Languedoc-Roussillon, Akademische Orchestervereinigung Göttingen, Mittelsächsische Philharmonie, Orchestre régional de Normandie, Orchestre régional Avignon-Provence, Orchestre de Pau pays de Béarn, Telemark Kammerorkester, Nizhni Novgorod Philharmonic Orchestra, Archangel State Chamber Orchestra, Orchestre National de Lille, Saint-Petersburg Northern Synfonia Orchestra, Orchestre Philharmonique de Nice, Russian Camerata, Scarborough Symphony Orchestra and Nizhni Novgorod Soloists. In July 2015, Romberg’s 60 min orchestral work Homériade closed the world’s largest performing arts festival in Avignon, France, to general recognition. Romberg currently divides his time between southern France and his homeland, Norway. He is former music director of the Rose Castle in Oslo and from January 2024 he is the director of Nerdrum Museum in Stavern.

== Music and Style ==
Romberg's music has been associated with the neo-romantic current of composers in his generation in Scandinavia equally found in the works by Ola Gjeilo, Marcus Paus, Kim André Arnesen and others. He has on several occasions collaborated with the Norwegian painter Odd Nerdrum. He believes that J.R.R. Tolkien's concept of mythopoeia can be transferred to western classical music to infuse it with new energy, and has used the term Fantasy Music to describe his own music.

== Collaborations ==
He has on several occasions collaborated with other artists, notably the Norwegian electronica band Ulver conducting their live orchestral shows on stage, among others the MG_INC Orchestra and the Tasmanian Symphony Orchestra. In 2015 his one and a half hour long oratorio Homériade based on the mythic texts by the contemporary Greek poet Dimitris Dimitriadis, featuring Robin Renucci and the Orchestre régional Avignon-Provence, closed the 69th Avignon Festival. As a conductor he has worked with London Session Orchestra recording his own albums "Norse Mysteries" and "Scandi Drama" at Abbey Road Studios.

== Works ==
=== Orchestra ===
- Necronomicon Ouverture (after the text by H.P.Lovecraft), symphonic poem (2023)
- Symphony of Saints symphonic poem for soprano and orchestra (2019/2020)
- Fëanor (after the Silmarillion by J.R.R. Tolkien) symphonic poem (2017)
- Homériade (after the text by Dimitris Dimitriadis) oratorio for speaker and orchestra (2015)
- Telperion and Laurelin (after the Silmarillion by J.R.R. Tolkien) symphonic poem (2013)
- Quendi (after the Silmarillion by J.R.R. Tolkien) symphonic poem (2008)
- Véttir symphonic ouverture (2006)
- The Wonderbird (after a tale from Kazakhstan) symphonic ballet in 18 movements (2006/2008)
- Persian Nights symphonic poem (2005)

=== Concertos ===
- Twilight Concerto (after a selection of poems by Robert E. Howard) concerto for cello and string orchestra (2021)
- Flores Malum (after a selection of poems by Charles Baudelaire) concerto for clarinet and string orchestra (2019)
- Poemata Minora (after the poems by H.P.Lovecraft) concerto for violin and string orchestra (2015)
- Ramayan 3392 concerto for accordion and orchestra (2012/2013)
- The Moon concerto for two violins and orchestra (2009/2010)
- The Tale of Taliesin concerto for alto saxophone and orchestra (2007)

=== Choral works ===
- Requiem of Runes (after text fragments from Varangian runestones found in Sweden) for mixed choir and accordion (2022-2023)
- Varanigan Lied (2021)
- Streghe (after ancient Etruscan hymns) for girls choir (2012)
- Rúnatal (after stanza 138-146 from Hávamál ) for mixed choir (2012)
- Aradia or the Gospel of the Witches (after Charles Godfrey Leland's collection of writings on pagan witchcraft from Tuscany) for mixed choir (2011/2012)
- Eldarinwë Líri (after elven poems by J.R.R. Tolkien) for girls choir (2009/2010)

=== Chamber music ===
- Werewolf Songs (after poems by Cornelius Jakhelln), (2023)
- Elven Songs (after poems by Tolkien, Romberg, Louisa May Alcott, Jane Taylor), (2023)
- Moriquendi, for string quartet/string quintet (2022)
- The Enchanted Garden (2020-2022)
- Tableaux Féeriques, les Charmeurs, 13 small pieces for cello and piano (2014)
- The Tale of Slaine, for saxophone quartet (2010)
- Tableaux Féeriques, les Chuchoteurs, 17 small pieces for alto saxophone and piano (2011)

=== Piano ===
- Tableaux d'or after 2 paintings by Gustav Klimt (2022)
- Fantasy Variations on a very famous theme by Ramin Djawadi (2021)
- Valaquenta II after the Silmarillion by J.R.R. Tolkien (2020)
- Tableaux Kitsch after 4 paintings by Odd Nerdrum (2014)
- Eärendil after the poem by J.R.R. Tolkien (2013)
- Valaquenta after the Silmarillion by J.R.R. Tolkien (2009)
- Tableaux Fantastiques after 10 paintings by Jacek Yerka (2008)

=== Film/Production Music ===
- Scandi Drama (2018)
- Norse Mysteries (2017)
- The Vikings (2013)
- Haoma (2008)

== Awards and Residencies ==
- RO-CULTURA Programme within the Ministry of Culture residency, Bucharest, Romania, 2023
- Temnitzer Orgeltage residency, Berlin, Germany, 2023
- Classix Festival residency, Iași, Romania, 2023
- Norwegian state’s work grant for popular composers, 2016
- Poemata Minora, chosen as the musical piece of the year in NOPA, 2016
- Norwegian state’s work grant for popular composers, 2008
- First prize, Composing competition at De Unges Konsert in Bergen, 2007
- Prize Paul Woitschach’s foundation for symphonic entertainment music in Berlin, 2007

== Discography ==
- Lockdown Miniatures - Aurora (ACD5109) with Ole Martin Huser-Olsen, 2022
- Norwegian Saxophone - Lawo Classics (LWC1162) with Ola Asdahl Rokkones, Fabio Mastrangelo, 2018
- Homériade - Klarthe Records (KLA033), with Orchestre Régional Avignon-Provence, Robin Renucci, 2016
- Witch Mass - Lawo Music (LWM009) with Grex Vocalis, Det Norske Jentekor and Kammerkoret NOVA, 2015
- Sound Waves - Avie Records (AV2266) with Alexandra Silocea, 2013
- Valaquenta, Tableaux Fantastiques - Lawo Classics (LWC1022) with Aimo Pagin, 2011

== Discography/ Sound Library ==
- Norse Mysteries - Audio Network (ANW 2937) with London Session Orchestra and Kammerkoret NOVA, 2017
- Scandi Drama - Audio Network (ANW 3203) with London Session Orchestra, 2018

== Discography/Arrangement ==
- 300 - Deutsche Grammophon (0289 479 0084 9 CD DDD GH) with Ingolf Wunder 2013
- Messe I.X-VI.X - Ulver, ULVER-TRICK051, Jester Records 2014
