= Alexandra Silocea =

Romanian pianist

Alexandra Silocea (born 1984) is a Romanian-born French pianist and bösendorfer artist.

== Background ==
Alexandra Silocea was born in Romania. She began piano lessons aged eight with Gabriela Raducanu in Constanta/Romania. At the age of 11 she continued her studies at the "George Enescu" Music School in Bucharest.

After auditioning for the late Mihaela Ursuleasa in 2000, Mihaela encouraged Alexandra to apply for the entrance exam at the University of Music and Performing Arts Vienna.

16 years old, Alexandra passed the entrance exam and started studying at the Music University in Vienna.

Among her teachers were Oleg Maisenberg and Johannes Marian.

In 2008, she started studying at the Conservatoire National Superieur de Musique et de Danse Paris with Th. Paraschivesco and Laurent Cabasso.

Alexandra Silocea began appearing in concerts and recitals throughout Europe, the U.S., Canada and South America after her debut in 2008 with the Vienna Chamber Orchestra and Conductor Pablo Gonzalez.

== Discography ==
2011 Debut CD Prokofiev Piano Sonatas 1–5

2013 "Sound Waves", Works by Romberg, Debussy, Ravel, Liszt, and Schubert/Liszt

2015 Cello Sonatas by Enescu, Shostakovich & Prokofiev
