= Kamler =

Kamler is a surname. Notable people with the surname include:

- Brian Kamler (born 1972), American soccer player
- Erin Kamler (born 1975), American writer and composer
- Ewa Kamler (born 1937), Polish biologist
- Kenneth Kamler, American surgeon

== See also ==
- 18891 Kamler, a main-belt asteroid
- Kammler, a surname
