= Trond Kverno =

Norwegian composer (born 1945)

Trond Hans Farner Kverno (born 20 October 1945, in Oslo) is a contemporary Norwegian composer. He received degrees in church music, music theory and choir direction from the Norwegian Academy of Music. He is known for his liturgical compositions.

He also serves as an Auxiliary Bishop of the Christ Catholic Church International.

Church music has spearheaded major new developments in music in Norway throughout the post-war period, in terms of both musical innovation and institutional renewal. At the same time church music composers have enjoyed growing popularity among musicians and listeners alike. Trond H.F. Kverno has been an exponent of this tradition since the 1970s, and his compositions are today among the finest and most frequently performed in Norway.

Trond H.F. Kverno was born in Oslo in 1945. He took his degree in church music from the Oslo Conservatory of Music in 1967. The following year he took a degree in music theory and choir direction. He was ordained deacon of music in 1975, and has served as an organist in a number of churches in Oslo and elsewhere.

After beginning his teaching career at the Oslo Conservatory of Music in 1971, Trond H.F. Kverno transferred to the Norwegian Academy of Music in 1973, the year of its founding, where he has been a prominent figure in the teaching of music theory. Since 1978 he has been senior lecturer in church music and composition theory. He has been particularly involved in the more creative, performance-oriented aspects of the latter, focusing on liturgical organ playing, improvisation and composition for use in church services. Since the introduction of a graduate programme in church music at the academy in 1983, he has also taught within the fields of liturgiology and hymnody. In 1994 he was appointed professor in church music, with church music composition as his main subject.

Trond H.F. Kverno has also gained national recognition in the latter field. He was a member of the liturgical commission (1976–78) appointed to reform the liturgical books of the Church of Norway. He has drawn on his experience from the commission in the fields of composition and practical liturgy in positions connected to the Oslo Cathedral and Gamle Aker Church, Oslo. Norsk Høymesse 1977 (The Norwegian Morning Service) includes several melodies composed by Kverno in its general series.

The liturgical commission was also responsible for laying the groundwork for Norsk Salmebok (Norwegian Hymnal), written in 1983. Kverno finds it especially challenging to compose for gatherings with no particular musical expertise, and regards every melody which is included in a songbook or hymnal as a small triumph. In this respect he has a good deal to be proud of: Norsk Salmebok of 1983 includes 27 of his hymns, and his compositions are also to be found in hymnals in Sweden, Finland, Denmark and Germany.

Trond H.F. Kverno regards his career primarily in terms of his church music accomplishments. In his view, the concept "absolute music" is a rare occurrence, as most works are generally part of an ideological or aesthetic context. The individual work may also reflect the person who commissioned it, its users or its listeners. In Kverno's opinion, music performed in a church differs significantly from that played in a concert hall: "The performer is the entire congregation where everyone sings, or where some sing while others pray. The congregation is also an instrument. The music resounds through the faith of the universal church as a sacrifice to the Holy Trinity. The goal is the congregation's prayer, rather than aesthetic pleasure. The essential point is that the music hears us and interprets us before the throne of God, not that we hear the music. This is the fundamental assumption on which my work is based. I would liken my work to that of the painter of icons, where each icon is a window to a reality other than that which surrounds us."

== Production ==
=== Selected works ===
==== Psalms ====
- Vi skal se deg, Herre Jesus
- En dag skal Herrens skaperdrømmer møte
- I dine hender, Fader blid
- Vi rekker våre hender frem
- Noen må våke i verdens natt
- Dagsens auga sloknar ut

==== Choir works and church music ====
- Livets tre (1972)
- Deus noster refugium (1972)
- Jesu Kristi syv ord på korset (1973)
- Tu solus Dominus (1974)
- Rydd vei for Herren (1975)
- Jesus satt i båten (1976)
- Nunc dimittis (1976)
- Ave maris stella (1976)
- Missa fidei mysterii (1983)
- Jeremia, kirkespill (1984)
- Missa orbis factor (1985)
- Passio secundum Matthaeum (1986)
- Triptychon II (1989)
- Sett meg som segl på hjertet ditt (1997)
- Hallvard fra Huseby (2000)
- En ny himmel og en ny jord (2000)
- Markuspasjonen (2004)
- Judica me Deus (2014)
- Myrra og røykelse angar (2014)

=== Discography ===
- Salmekameratene, Sterk & Ny (2010)
- Kammerkoret Ultima Thule, Trolldom (2010)
- Martin Enger Holm (2009)
- Kammerkoret Nova (2008)
- Oslo Gospel Choir, Salmeskatt (2003)
- Vokal Nord, Advenio (2003)
- Torbjørn Dyrud, Cor (2001)
- Skruk, Stjernen Ledet Vise Menn (1998)
- Konrad Ruhland, Carl Orff - Ante-post (1998)
- Ole Paus, Det begynner å bli et liv: det begynner å ligne en bønn (1998)
- Barnekoret Levende Lys, Fortell - fra det nye testamente (1998)
- Grex Vocalis, Crux (1997)
- Matteuspasjonen (1996)
- Oslo Domkor, Contemporary Church Music from Scandinavia (1987)
