= Steffen Kammler =

Norwegian conductor (born 1965)

Steffen Kammler is a Norwegian conductor born 6 May 1965 in Calbe in the German district Saxony-Anhalt. He has been a Norwegian citizen since 2008.

== Education ==
Steffen Kammler was a member of the 700-year-old boy choir Dresdner Kreuzchor from 1975 to 1983, in Dresden, which is the capital of Saxony. Kammler studied journalism at the University of Leipzig and took his diploma in 1990. His education continued with choir conducting at the music college in Weimar with Gert Frischmut, and orchestral conducting at music colleges in Weimar and Leipzig.

== Career ==
Kammler worked with the Chamber choir Josquin des Prez in Leipzig from 1990 to 1997. He was employed as chorus master at the Opernhaus Halle from 1996 to 1997 and in the same position at Hamburgische Staatsoper from 1997 to 2001. Kammler was chorus master for Den Norske Opera's choir, from 2001 to 2009, and from 2009 to 2010 conductor for Oslo Vokalensemble.

He is currently (since 2008) conducting Cæciliaforeningen and since 2009 Den norske Studentersangforening. Since 2009 is Kammler guest conductor at the university in Shaoxing.
