= Calbe =

- Town
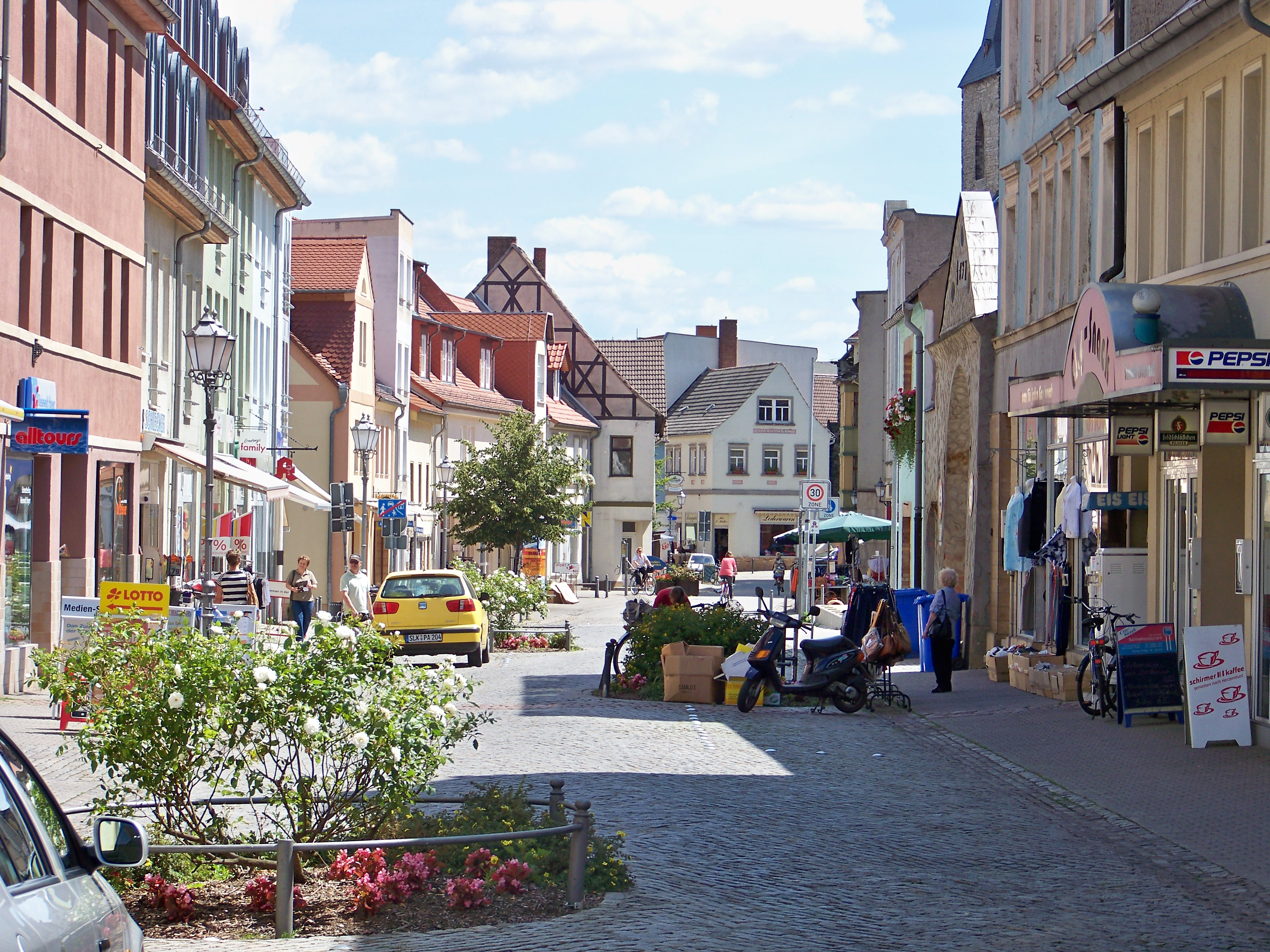

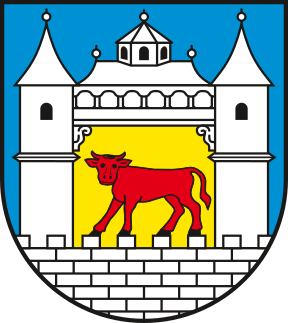
- Coat of arms

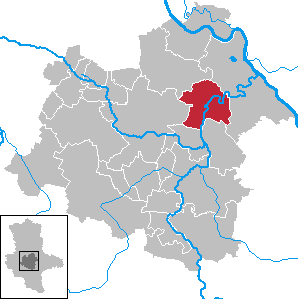
- Location of Calbe within Salzlandkreis district
- Interactive map of Calbe
- Location within Germany Location within Saxony-Anhalt
- Coordinates: 51°54′12″N 11°46′33″E
- Country: Germany
- State: Saxony-Anhalt
- District: Salzlandkreis
- Subdivisions: 5

Government
  - Mayor (2021–28): Sven Hause

Area
  - Total: 56.62 km^{2} (21.86 sq mi)
- Elevation: 60 m (200 ft)

Population (2025-12-31)
  - Total: 7,933
  - Density: 140.1/km^{2} (362.9/sq mi)
- Time zone: UTC+01:00 (CET)
  - Summer (DST): UTC+02:00 (CEST)
- Postal codes: 39240
- Dialling codes: 039291
- Vehicle registration: SLK, SBK, BBG, ASL, SFT
- Website: www.calbe.de

Calbe (German pronunciation: [ˈkalbə]; official name: Calbe (Saale)) is a town in the district of Salzlandkreis, in Saxony-Anhalt, in east-central Germany.

== Geography ==
It is situated on the river Saale, approx. 12 kilometers (7.5 mi) north of Bernburg, and 25 kilometers (16 mi) southeast of Magdeburg. It is known as Calbe an der Saale, to distinguish it from the smaller town of Kalbe on the Milde in the same state.

Historically it was a railway junction, and among its industries were wool-weaving and the manufacture of cloth, paper, stoves, sugar and bricks. Cucumbers and onions were cultivated, and soft coal was mined in the neighborhood.

The river Saale runs on the east side of the town, and over a weir. This is a small kind of dam where the water flows over the structure allowing passage of shallow draft barges up or down — moreover rather than being channeled through it the water is used off this flow to generate energy and it raises the water level only a relatively small amount.

At the weir, the Saale is partly diverted, while some of the river flows over the weir and continues on its natural path, the rest is channeled through an artificial path, known as "Mühlgraben". This takes the water between two (now abandoned) buildings which used to harness the power of the water to mill grain into flour, and the other to make paper. After flowing between the mills, the water continues on an artificial path for a couple of miles before returning to the Saale proper.

The small island of land between the Saale and the artificial "Mühlgraben" is called "Heger" in German. The local sports area and the swimming bath are located at the island. The island is connected to the city of Calbe by a bridge on the far side and also by a small ferry on the opposite side, which swings back and forth between the urban district "Gottesgnaden" (engl.: God's Grace) and island using an anchor and cable system.

== Etymology ==
The name of the town comes from the verb "kalben", which means to calf (for a cow to give birth) in German, but it could also come from the Latin adjective "calvus", which describes a bleak landscape.

== History ==
In 1710, a commune of French Huguenots was founded in the town.

== Sights ==
The town has a statue of Roland outside its city hall. Roland is a symbol who represents many small and medium-sized towns in Saxony-Anhalt, symbolising free trade and prosperity. The town also has a very old church, and a tower known as the "Hexenturm" ("Witchtower"), in which the townspeople imprisoned accused witches and tortured them in the Middle Ages. There is a Bismarck Tower at the Wartenberg in Calbe.

== Culture ==
Calbe is famous for the long tradition for growing onions, which are regionally called "Bollen".

== Personality ==
=== Sons and daughters of the town ===
- Anna Margareta von Haugwitz (1622–1673)
- Constantin von Dietze (1891–1973), agricultural scientist and theologian
- Hermann Bley (1936–2011), football player
- Steffen Kammler (born 1965), Norwegian conductor
- Christian Hartmann (born 1974), politician (CDU)

=== Personalities associated with Calbe ===
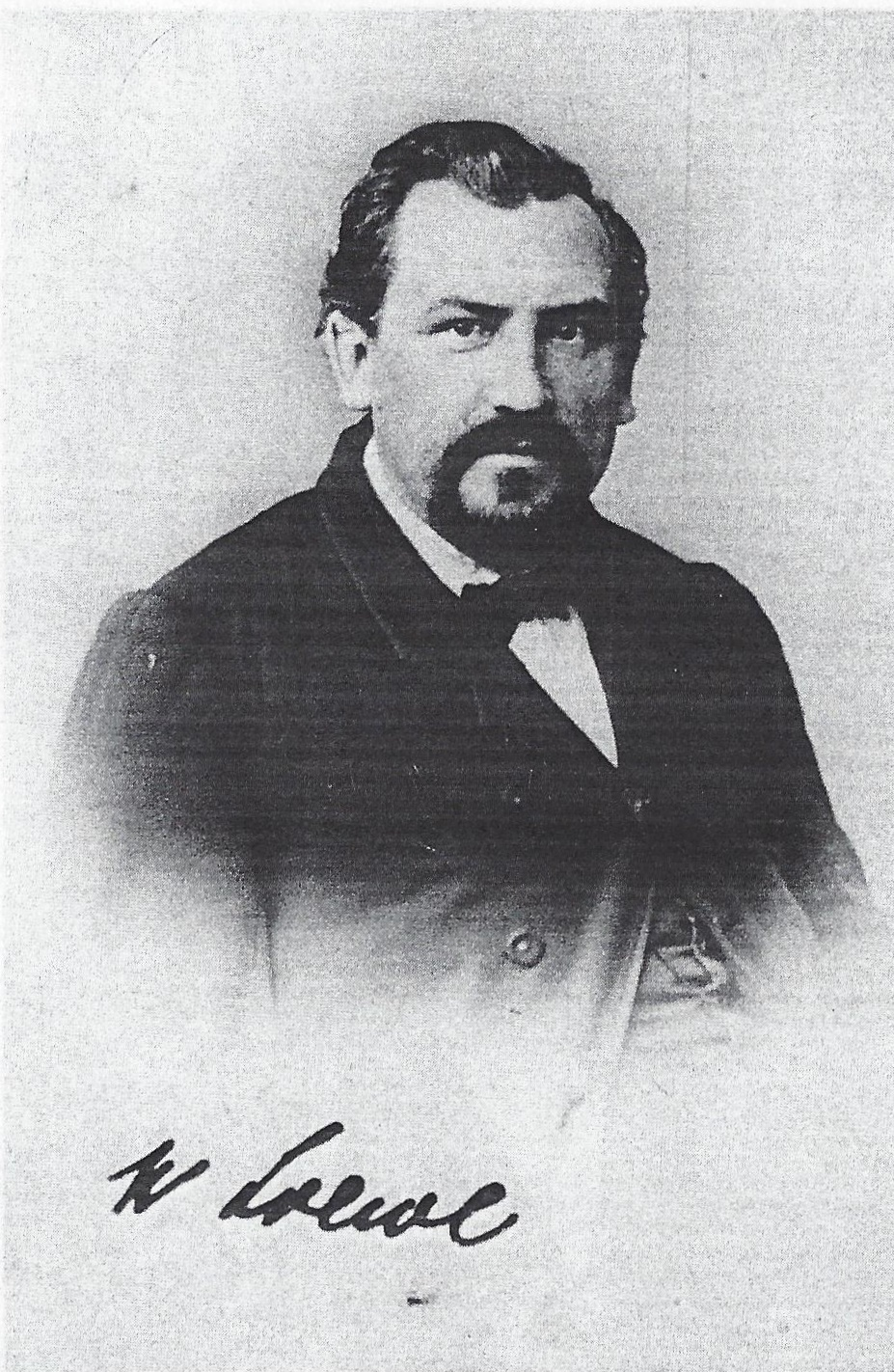
Wilhelm Loewe

- Till Eulenspiegel, trickster figure
- Wilhelm Loewe (1814–1886), politician, President of the Rump Parliament
- Marie Nathusius, (1817–1857), narrator
- Christian Scriver, (1629–1693), theologian
