= Sigurd Østrem =

Norwegian jurist

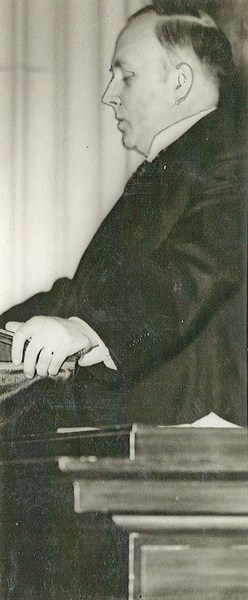
Sigurd Østrem, c. 1938

Sigurd Østrem (1884–1954) was a Norwegian jurist.

He took the dr.juris degree in 1926 with the thesis De kollektive arbeidskampe efter norsk ret. During the occupation of Norway by Nazi Germany he held more than thirty radio lectures in the Nazi-controlled Norwegian Broadcasting Corporation, explaining new Nazi laws and reforms in a Norwegian historical context. He was also appointed as a docent in jurisprudence at the University of Oslo on 27 June 1941, but lost his job shortly after the war, on 15 May 1945. He died on 22 February 1954.
